= List of birds of Telangana =

The state of Telangana, India, has 497 bird species within its boundaries.

The official state bird of Telangana is the pala pitta, also known as the Indian roller, Coracias benghalensis.

This list's taxonomic treatment (designation and sequence of orders, families and species) and nomenclature (common and scientific names) follow the conventions of the IOC World Bird List, version 11.2. This list also uses British English throughout. Any bird names or other wording follows that convention.

The following tag has been used to highlight accidental species.

- (A) Accidental - also known as a rarity, it refers to a species that rarely or accidentally occurs in Telangana-typically less than ten confirmed records

== Ducks, geese, and swans ==
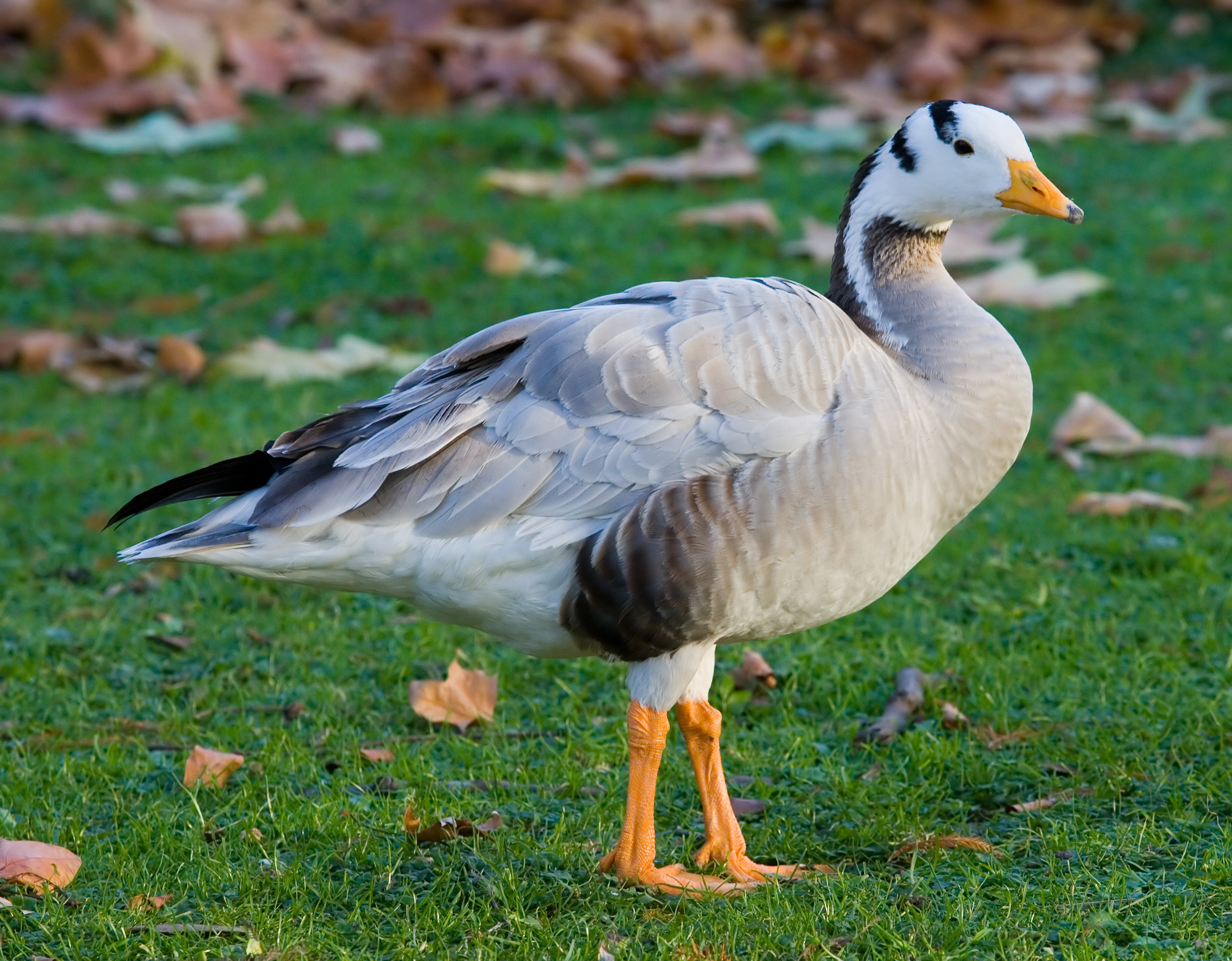
Bar-headed goose

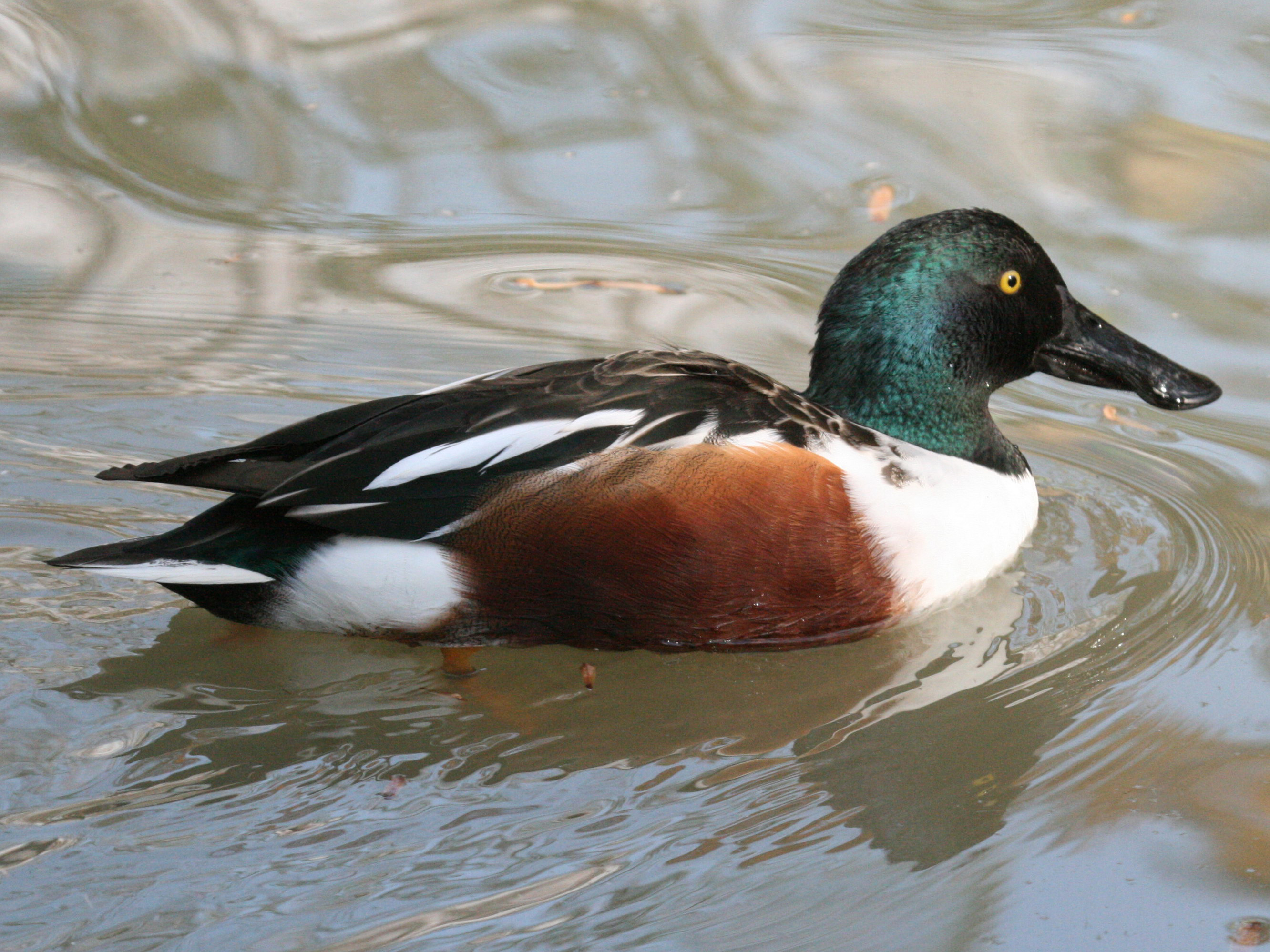
Northern shoveller

Order: Anseriformes Family: Anatidae

Anatidae includes the ducks and most duck-like waterfowl, such as geese and swans. These birds are adapted to an aquatic existence with webbed feet, flattened bills, and feathers that are excellent at shedding water due to an oily coating.

- Lesser whistling duck, Dendrocygna javanica
- Fulvous whistling duck, Dendrocygna bicolor
- Bar-headed goose, Anser indicus
- Greylag goose, Anser anser
- Knob-billed duck, Sarkidiornis melanotos
- Ruddy shelduck, Tadorna ferruginea
- Cotton pygmy goose, Nettapus coromandelianus
- Garganey, Spatula querquedula
- Northern shoveler, Spatula clypeata
- Gadwall, Mareca strepera
- Eurasian wigeon, Mareca penelope
- Indian spot-billed duck, Anas poecilorhyncha
- Mallard, Anas platyrhynchos
- Northern pintail, Anas acuta
- Eurasian teal, Anas crecca
- Red-crested pochard, Netta rufina
- Common pochard, Aythya ferina
- Ferruginous duck, Aythya nyroca
- Tufted duck, Aythya fuligula

== Pheasants and allies ==
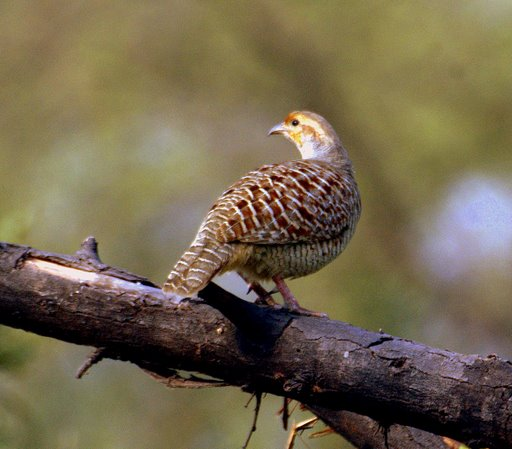
Grey francolin

Order: Galliformes Family: Phasianidae

The Phasianidae are a family of terrestrial birds which consists of quails, partridges, snowcocks, francolins, spurfowls, tragopans, monals, pheasants, peafowls and jungle fowls. In general, they are plump (although they vary in size) and have broad, relatively short wings.

- Painted francolin, Francolinus pictus
- Grey francolin, Francolinus pondicerianus
- Common quail, Coturnix coturnix
- Rain quail, Coturnix coromandelica
- King quail, Excalfactoria chinensis
- Jungle bush quail, Perdicula asiatica
- Rock bush quail, Perdicula argoondah
- Painted bush quail, Perdicula erythrorhyncha
- Red spurfowl, Galloperdix spadicea
- Painted spurfowl, Galloperdix lunulata
- Red junglefowl, Gallus gallus
- Grey junglefowl, Gallus sonneratii
- Indian peafowl, Pavo cristatus

== Nightjars ==
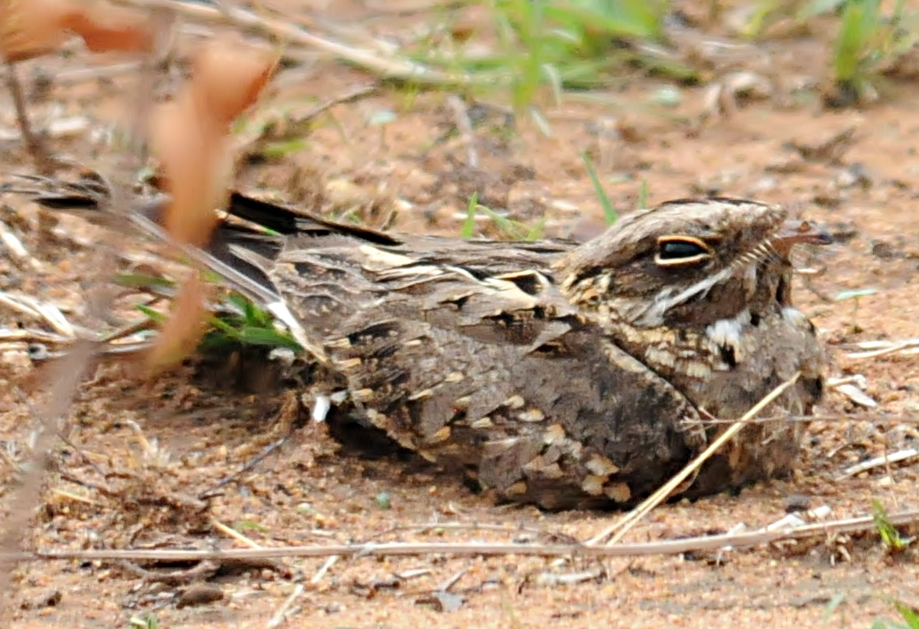
Indian nightjar

Order: Caprimulgiformes Family: Caprimulgidae

Nightjars are medium-sized nocturnal birds that usually nest on the ground. They have long wings, short legs and very short bills. Most have small feet, of little use for walking, and long pointed wings. Their soft plumage is camouflaged to resemble bark or leaves.

- Jungle nightjar, Caprimulgus indicus
- Grey nightjar, Caprimulgus jotaka
- Jerdon's nightjar, Caprimulgus atripennis
- Large-tailed nightjar, Caprimulgus macrurus
- Indian nightjar, Caprimulgus asiaticus
- Savanna nightjar, Caprimulgus affinis

== Treeswifts ==
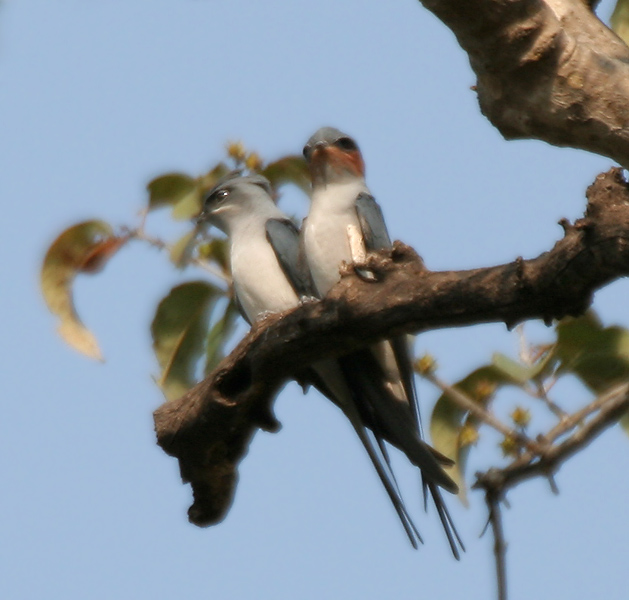
Crested treeswift

Order: Apodiformes Family: Hemiprocnidae

The treeswifts, also called crested swifts, are closely related to the true swifts. They differ from the other swifts in that they have crests, long forked tails and softer plumage.

- Crested treeswift, Hemiprocne coronata

== Swifts ==
Order: Apodiformes Family: Apodidae

Swifts are small birds which spend the majority of their lives flying. These birds have very short legs and never settle voluntarily on the ground, perching instead only on vertical surfaces. Many swifts have long swept-back wings which resemble a crescent or boomerang.

- White-rumped spinetail, Zoonavena sylvatica
- Asian palm swift, Cypsiurus balasiensis
- Alpine swift, Tachymarptis melba
- Blyth's swift, Apus leuconyx
- Little swift, Apus affinis
- House swift, Apus nipalensis

== Bustards ==
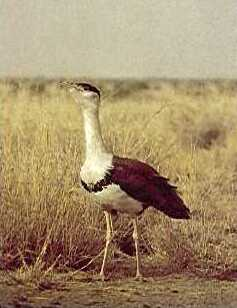
Great Indian bustard

Order: Otidiformes Family: Otididae

Bustards are large terrestrial birds mainly associated with dry open country and steppes in the Old World. They are omnivorous and nest on the ground. They walk steadily on strong legs and big toes, pecking for food as they go. They have long broad wings with "fingered" wingtips and striking patterns in flight. Many have interesting mating displays.

- Great Indian bustard, Ardeotis nigriceps
- Lesser florican, Sypheotides indicus

== Cuckoos ==
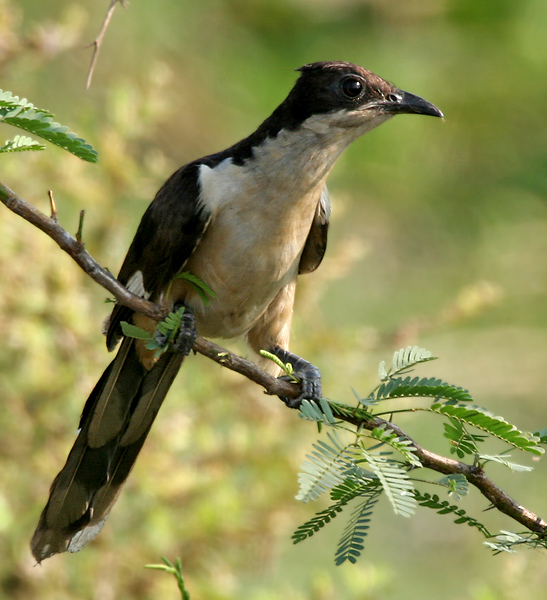
Jacobin cuckoo

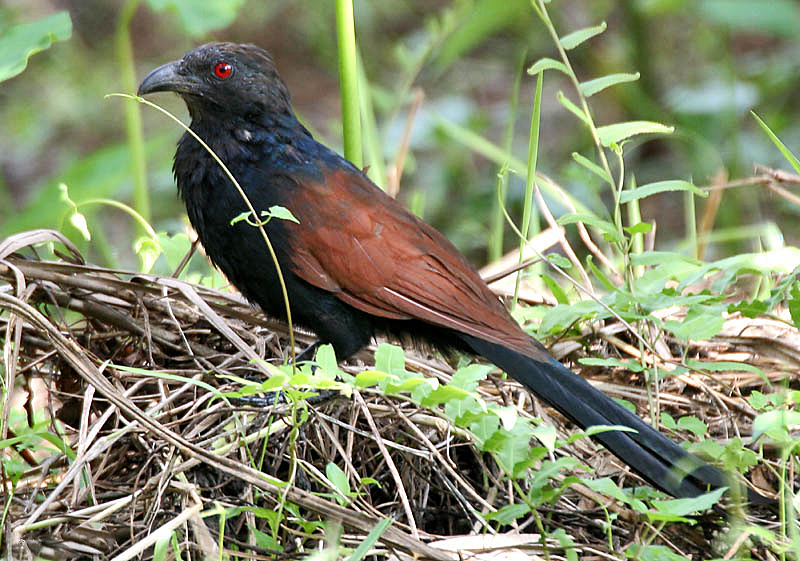
Greater coucal

Order: Cuculiformes Family: Cuculidae

The family Cuculidae includes cuckoos, roadrunners and anis. These birds are of variable size with slender bodies, long tails and strong legs. Many are brood parasites.

- Greater coucal, Centropus sinensis
- Sirkeer malkoha, Taccocua leschenaultii
- Blue-faced malkoha, Phaenicophaeus viridirostris
- Chestnut-winged cuckoo, Clamator coromandus
- Jacobin cuckoo, Clamator jacobinus
- Asian koel, Eudynamys scolopaceus
- Banded bay cuckoo, Cacomantis sonneratii
- Plaintive cuckoo, Cacomantis merulinus
- Grey-bellied cuckoo, Cacomantis passerinus
- Fork-tailed drongo-cuckoo, Surniculus dicruroides
- Large hawk-cuckoo, Hierococcyx sparverioides
- Common hawk-cuckoo, Hierococcyx varius
- Lesser cuckoo, Cuculus poliocephalus
- Indian cuckoo, Cuculus micropterus
- Common cuckoo, Cuculus canorus

== Sandgrouse ==
Order: Pterocliformes Family: Pteroclidae

Sandgrouse have small, pigeon like heads and necks, but sturdy compact bodies. They have long pointed wings and sometimes tails and a fast direct flight. Flocks fly to watering holes at dawn and dusk. Their legs are feathered down to the toes.

- Chestnut-bellied sandgrouse, Pterocles exustus
- Painted sandgrouse, Pterocles indicus

== Pigeons and doves ==
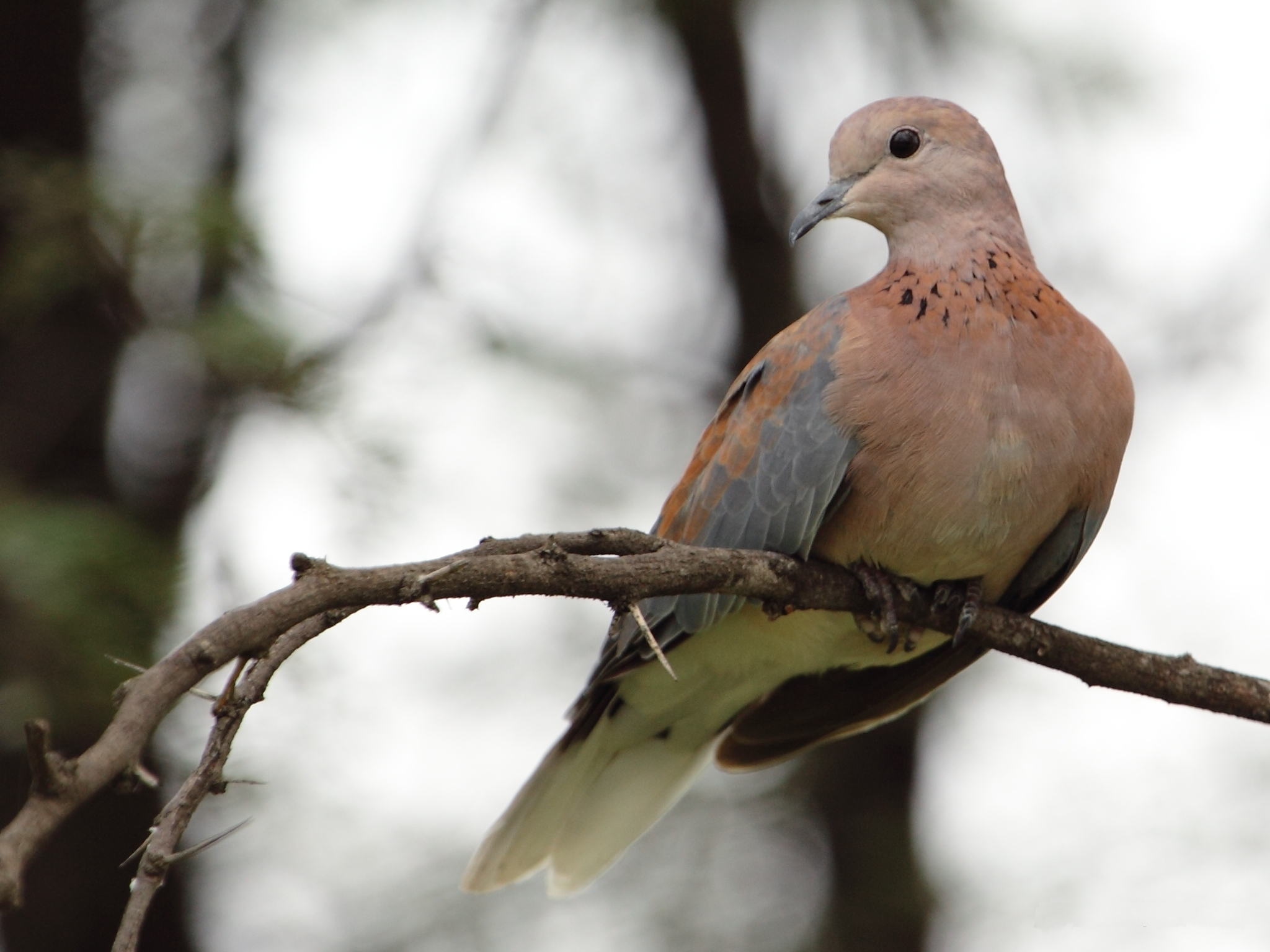
Laughing dove

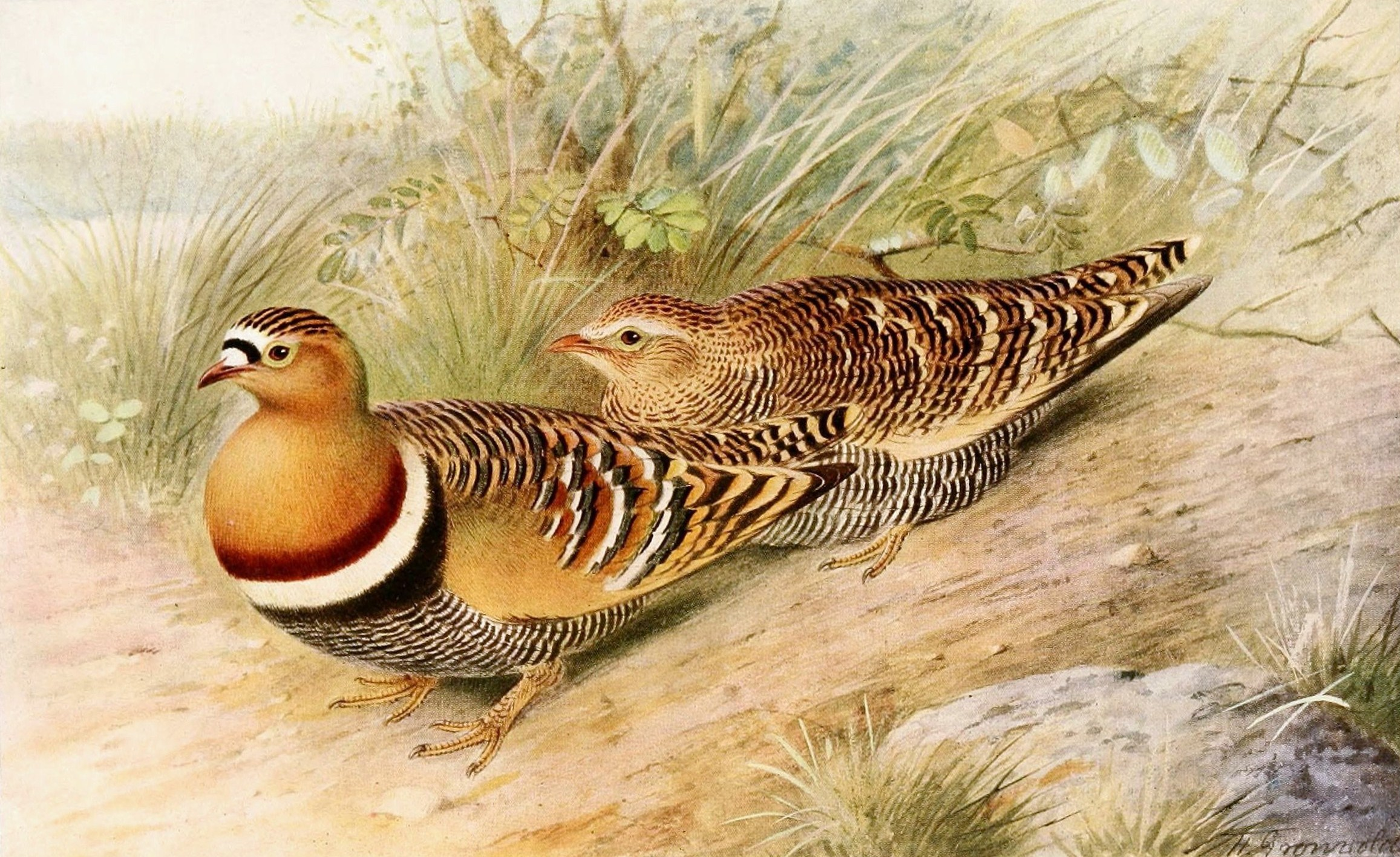
Painted sandgrouse

Order: Columbiformes Family: Columbidae

Pigeons and doves are stout-bodied birds with short necks and short slender bills with a fleshy cere.

- Rock dove, Columba livia
- Pale-capped pigeon, Columba punicea
- Oriental turtle dove, Streptopelia orientalis
- Eurasian collared dove, Streptopelia decaocto
- Red collared dove, Streptopelia tranquebarica
- Spotted dove, Spilopelia chinensis
- Laughing dove, Spilopelia senegalensis
- Common emerald dove, Chalcophaps indica
- Orange-breasted green pigeon, Treron bicinctus
- Thick-billed green pigeon, Treron curvirostra
- Yellow-footed green pigeon, Treron phoenicopterus
- Green imperial pigeon, Ducula aenea

== Rails, crakes, and coots ==
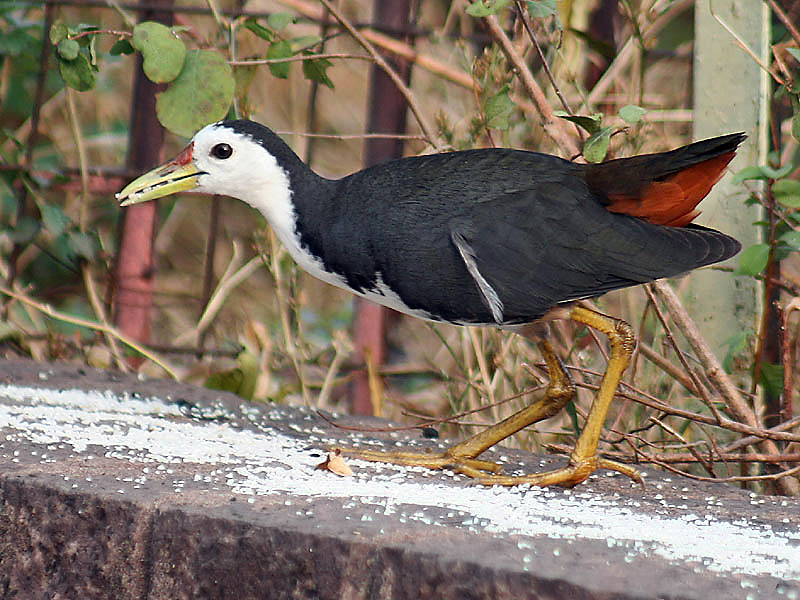
White-breasted waterhen

Order: Gruiformes Family: Rallidae

Rallidae is a large family of small to medium-sized birds which includes the rails, crakes, coots and gallinules. Typically they inhabit dense vegetation in damp environments near lakes, swamps or rivers. In general they are shy and secretive birds, making them difficult to observe. Most species have strong legs and long toes which are well adapted to soft uneven surfaces. They tend to have short, rounded wings and to be weak fliers.

- Water rail, Rallus aquaticus
- Slaty-breasted rail, Lewinia striata
- Common moorhen, Gallinula chloropus
- Eurasian coot, Fulica atra
- Grey-headed swamphen, Porphyrio poliocephalus
- Ruddy-breasted crake, Zapornia fusca
- Brown crake, Zapornia akool
- Baillon's crake, Zapornia pusilla
- Slaty-legged crake, Rallina eurizonoides
- Watercock, Gallicrex cinerea
- White-breasted waterhen, Amaurornis phoenicurus

== Cranes ==
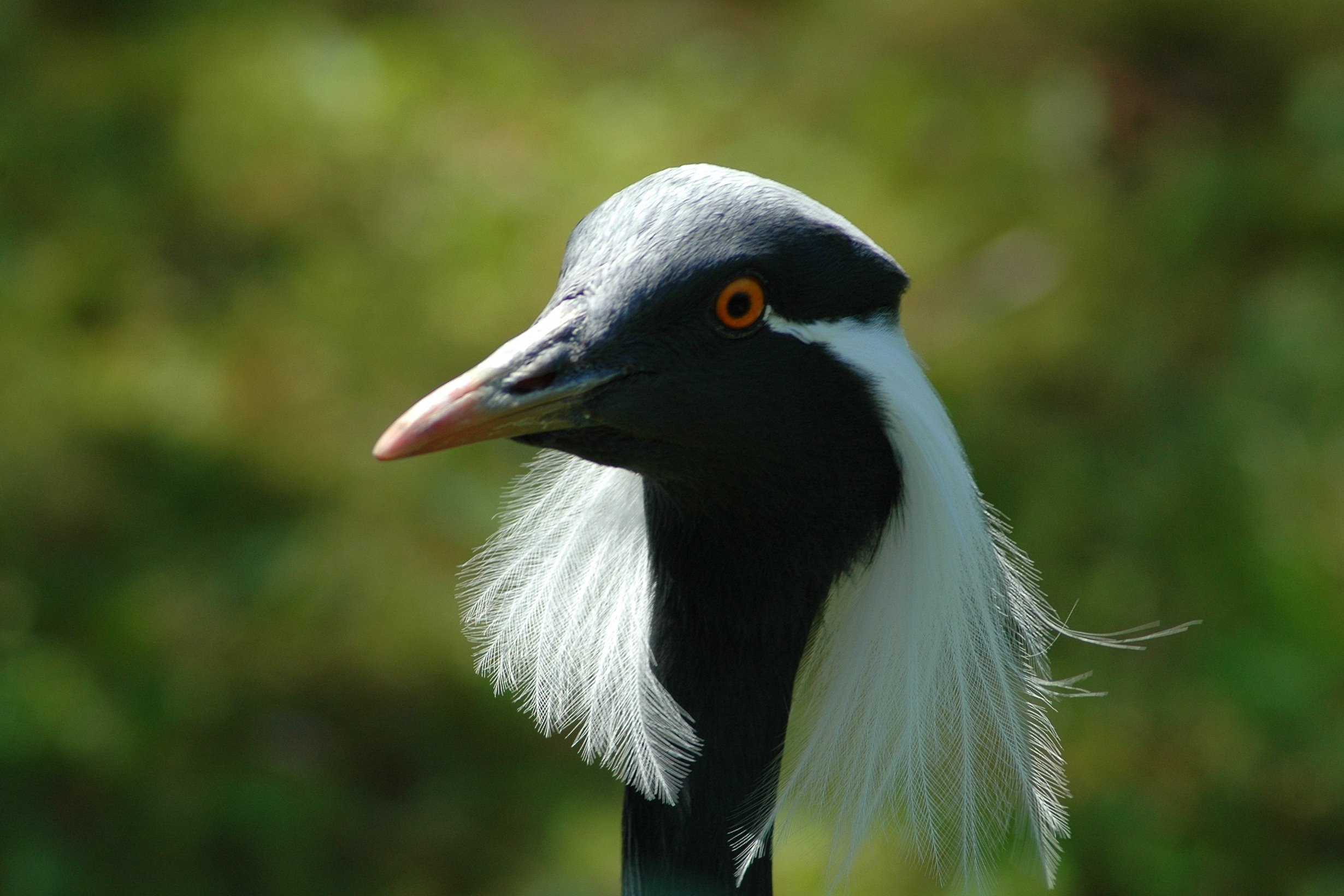
Demoiselle crane

Order: Gruiformes Family: Gruidae

Cranes are large, long-legged and long-necked birds. Unlike the similar-looking but unrelated herons, cranes fly with necks outstretched, not pulled back. Most have elaborate and noisy courting displays or "dances".

- Demoiselle crane, Grus virgo (A)
- Common crane, Grus grus

== Grebes ==
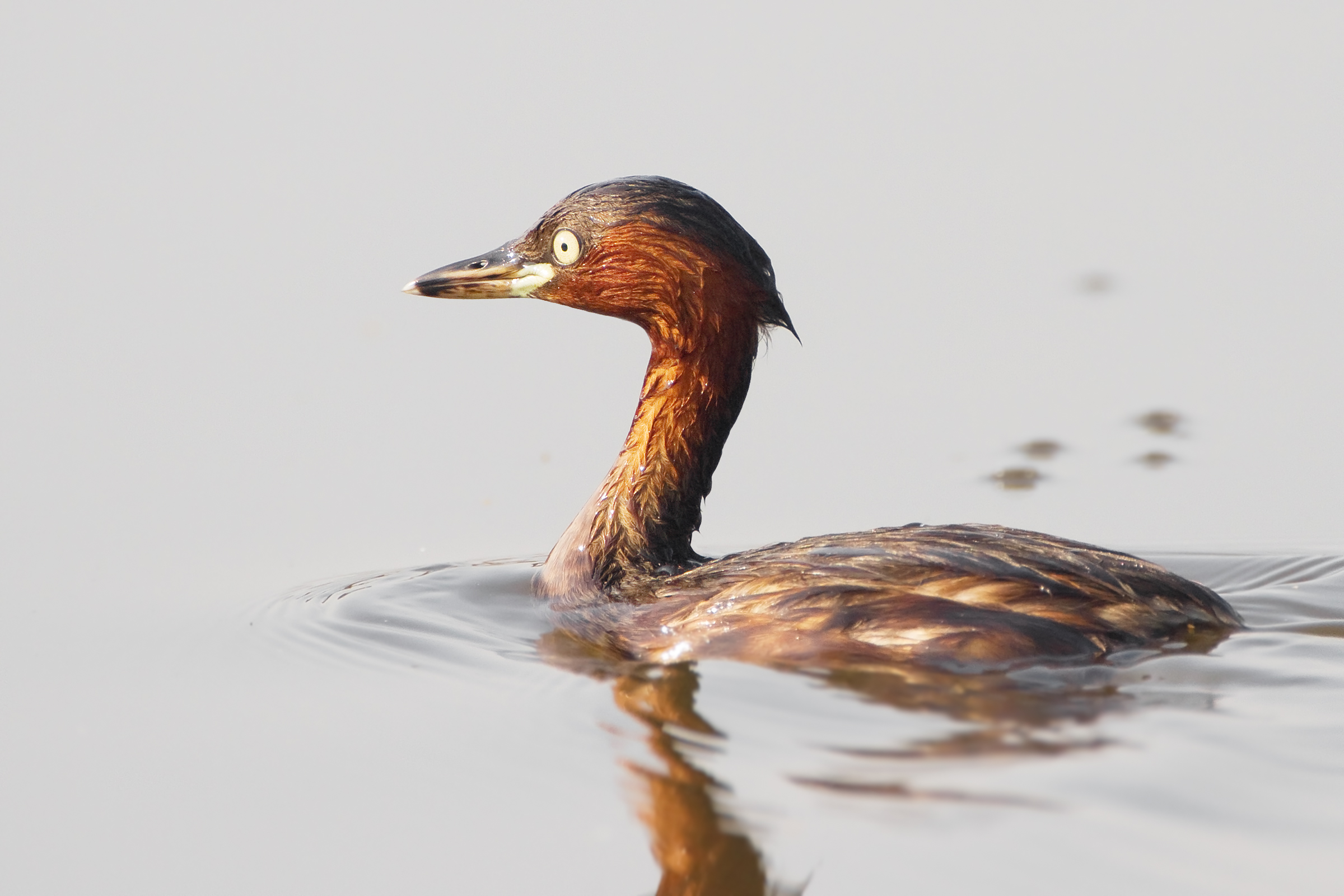
Little grebe

Order: Podicipediformes Family: Podicipedidae

Grebes are small to medium-large freshwater diving birds. They have lobed toes and are excellent swimmers and divers. However, they have their feet placed far back on the body, making them quite ungainly on land.

- Little grebe, Tachybaptus ruficollis

== Flamingos ==
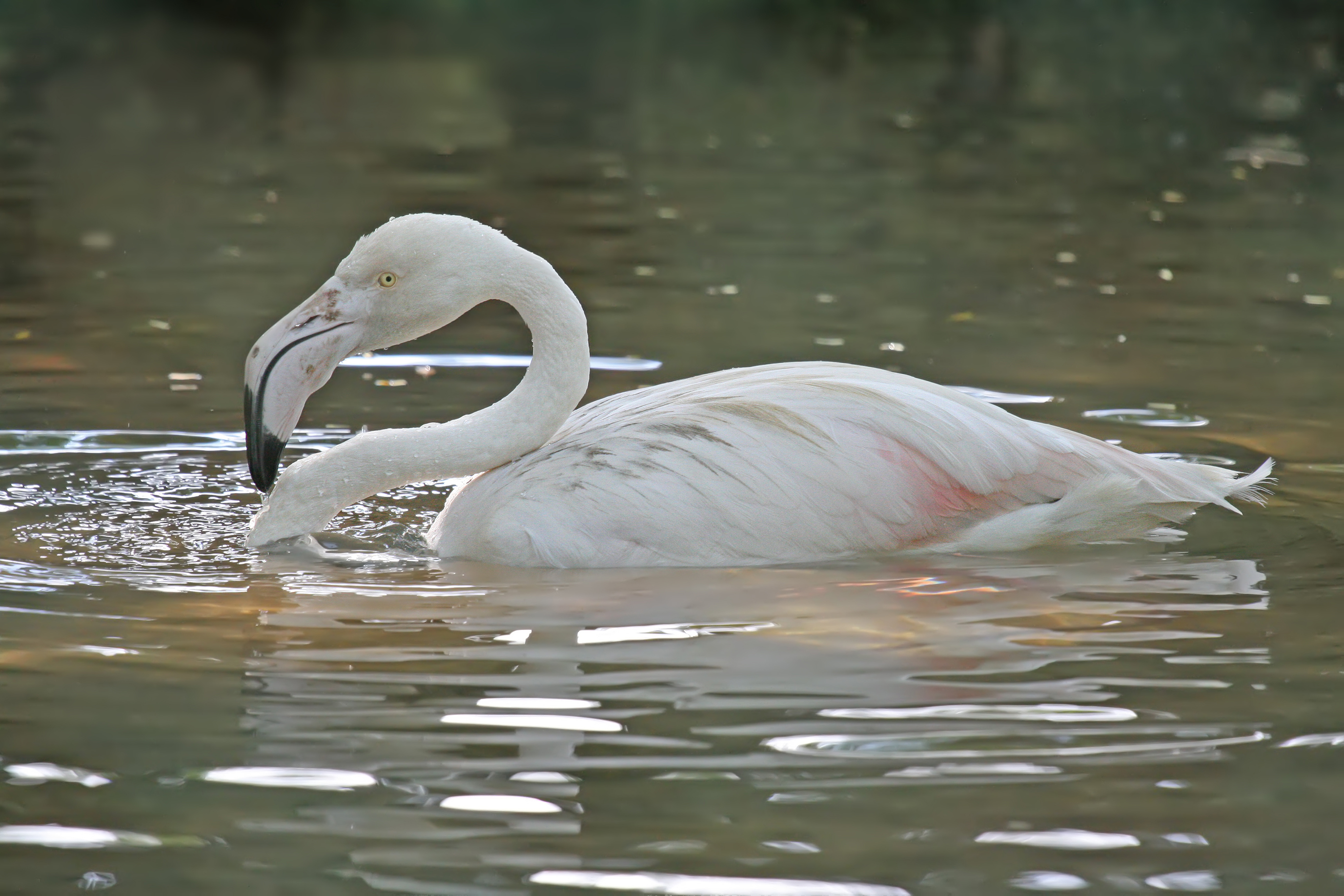
Greater flamingo

Order: Phoenicopteriformes Family: Phoenicopteridae

Flamingos are gregarious wading birds, usually 1 to 1.5 metres (3 to 5 ft) tall, found in both the Western and Eastern Hemispheres. Flamingos filter-feed on shellfish and algae. Their oddly shaped beaks are specially adapted to separate mud and silt from the food they consume and, uniquely, are used upside-down.

- Greater flamingo, Phoenicopterus roseus
- Lesser flamingo, Phoenicopterus minor

== Buttonquail ==
Order: Charadriiformes Family: Turnicidae

The buttonquail are small, drab, running birds which resemble the true quails. The female is the brighter of the sexes and initiates courtship. The male incubates the eggs and tends the young.

- Common buttonquail, Turnix sylvaticus
- Yellow-legged buttonquail, Turnix tanki
- Barred buttonquail, Turnix suscitator

== Stone-curlews and thick-knees ==
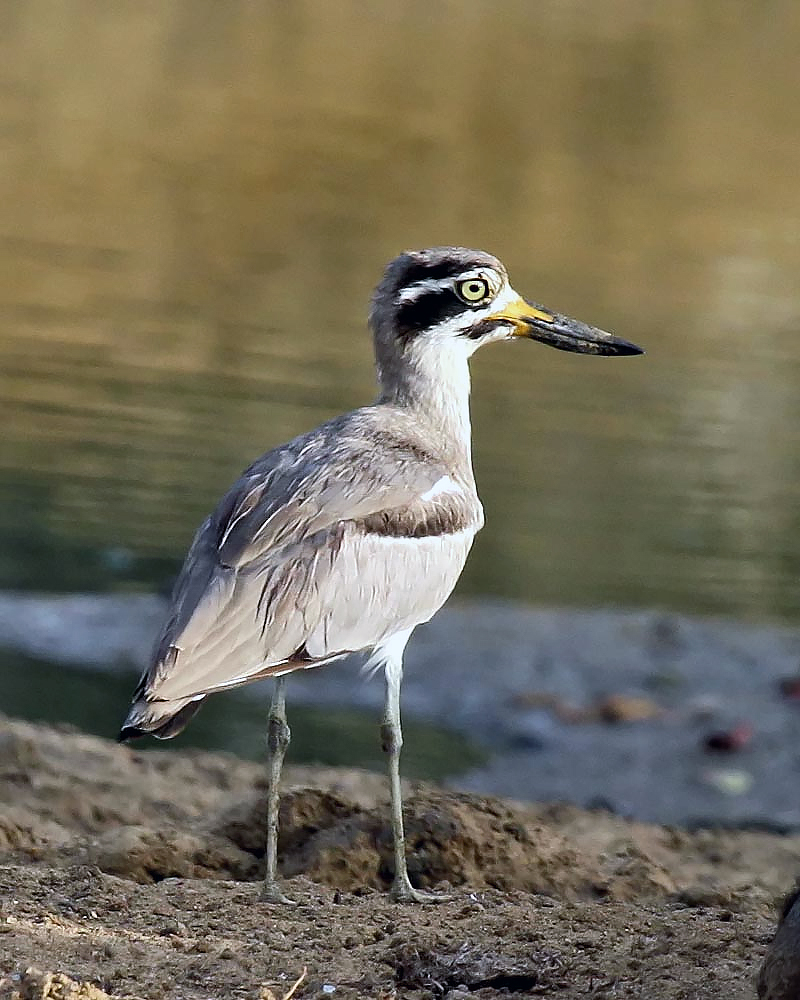
Great stone-curlew

Order: Charadriiformes Family: Burhinidae

The stone-curlews are a group of largely tropical waders in the family Burhinidae. They are found worldwide within the tropical zone, with some species also breeding in temperate Europe and Australia. They are medium to large waders with strong black or yellow-black bills, large yellow eyes and cryptic plumage. Despite being classed as waders, most species have a preference for arid or semi-arid habitats.

- Indian stone-curlew, Burhinus indicus
- Great stone-curlew, Esacus recurvirostris

== Stilts and avocets ==
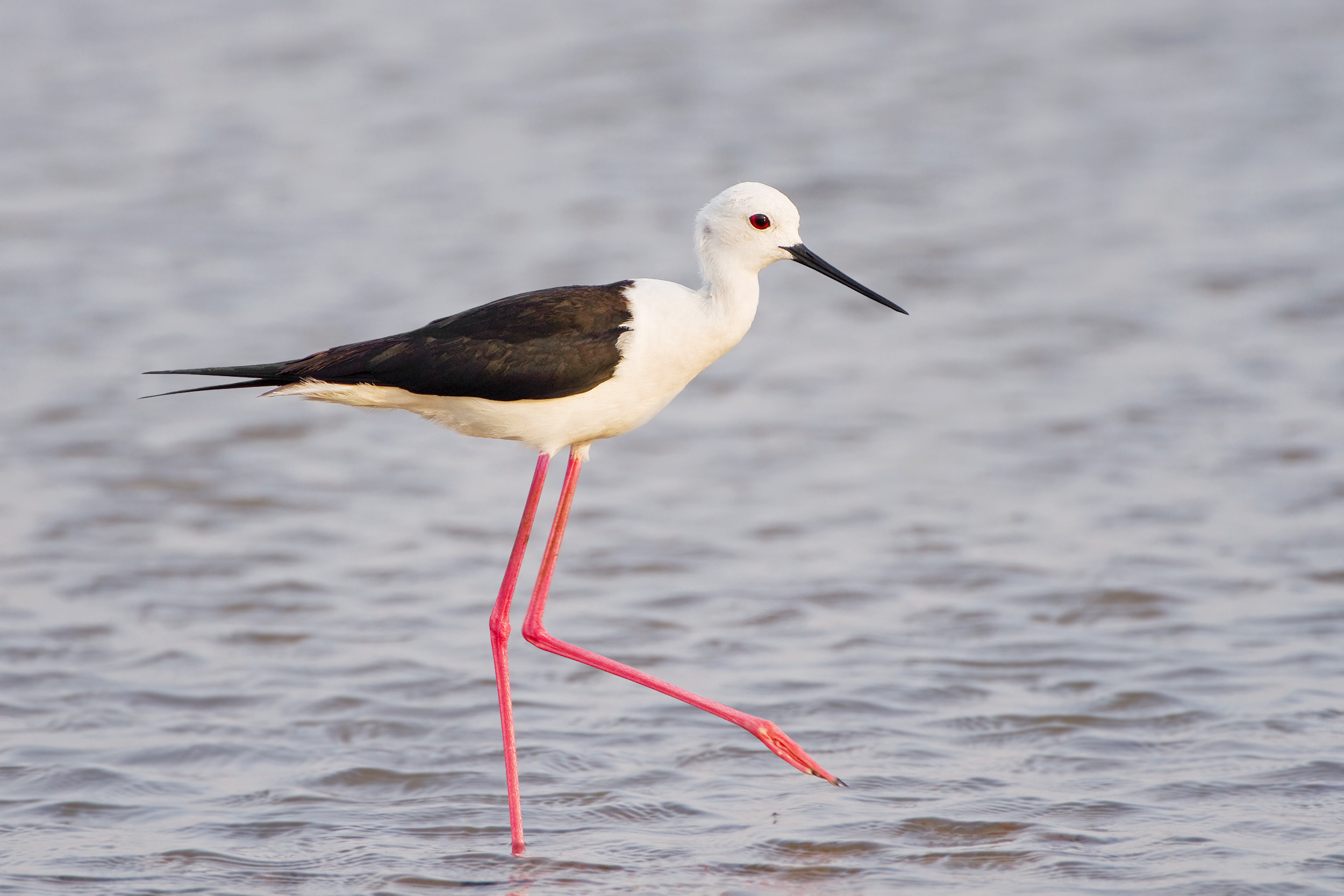
Black-winged stilt

Order: Charadriiformes Family: Recurvirostridae

Recurvirostridae is a family of large wading birds, which includes the avocets and stilts. The avocets have long legs and long up-curved bills. The stilts have extremely long legs and long, thin, straight bills.

- Black-winged stilt, Himantopus himantopus
- Pied avocet, Recurvirostra avosetta

== Plovers ==
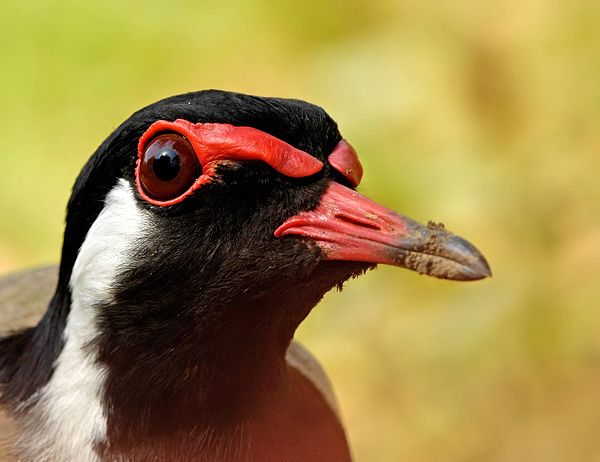
Red-wattled lapwing

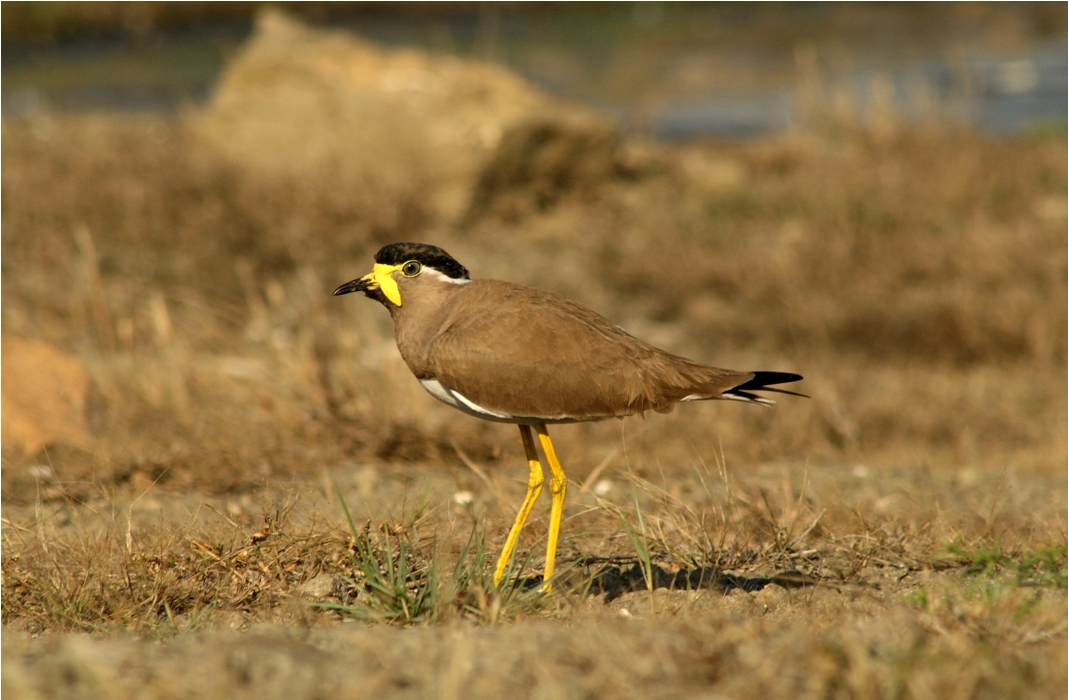
Yellow-wattled lapwing

Order: Charadriiformes Family: Charadriidae

The family Charadriidae includes the plovers, dotterels and lapwings. They are small to medium-sized birds with compact bodies, short, thick necks and long, usually pointed, wings. They are found in open country worldwide, mostly in habitats near water.

- River lapwing, Vanellus duvaucelii
- Yellow-wattled lapwing, Vanellus malabaricus
- Grey-headed lapwing, Vanellus cinereus
- Red-wattled lapwing, Vanellus indicus
- Sociable lapwing, Vanellus gregarius
- White-tailed lapwing, Vanellus leucurus
- Pacific golden plover, Pluvialis fulva
- Grey plover, Pluvialis squatarola
- Common ringed plover, Charadrius hiaticula
- Little ringed plover, Charadrius dubius
- Kentish plover, Charadrius alexandrinus
- Lesser sand plover, Charadrius mongolus
- Greater sand plover, Charadrius leschenaultii

== Painted-snipes ==
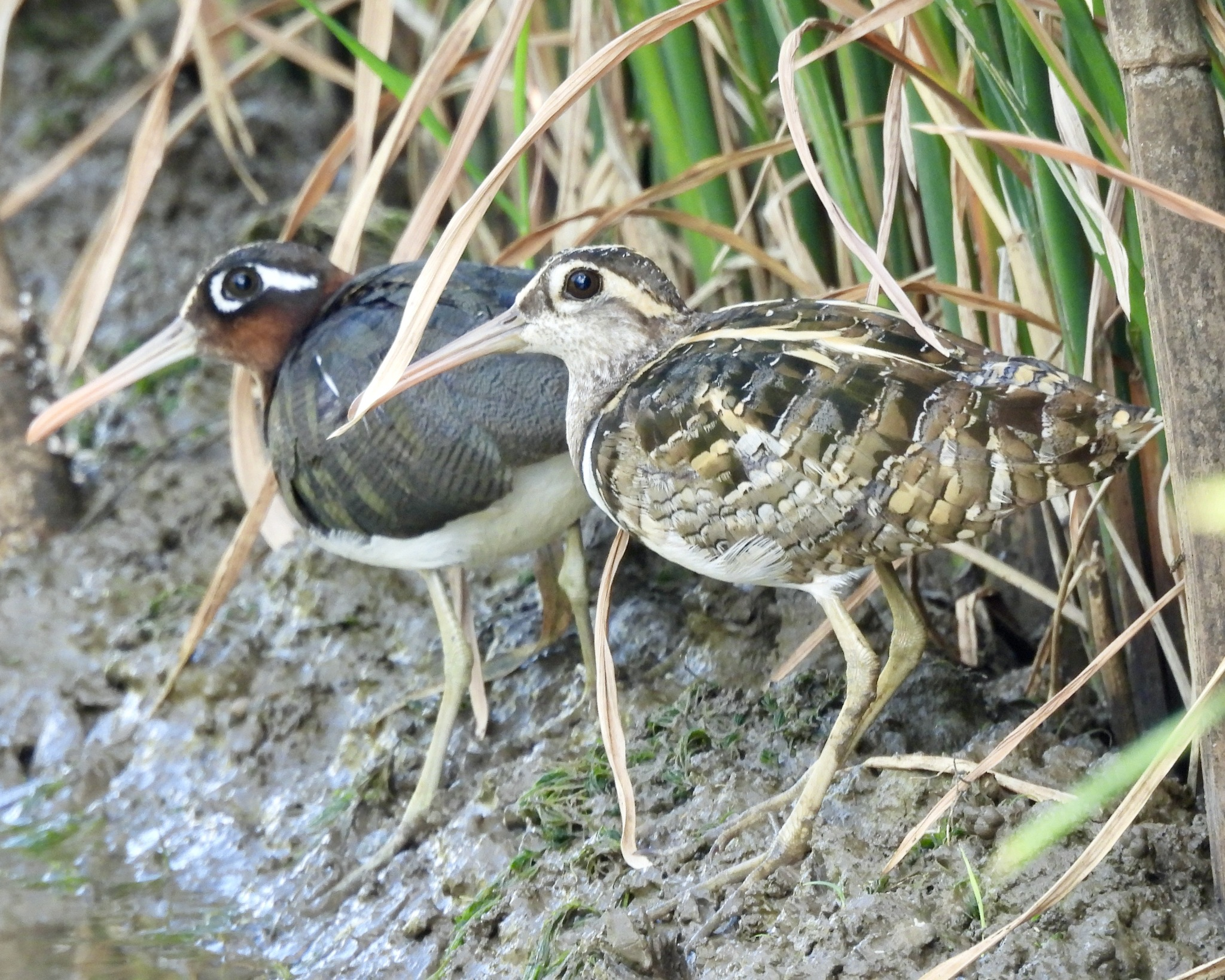
Greater painted-snipe

Order: Charadriiformes Family: Rostratulidae

Painted-snipes are short-legged, long-billed birds similar in shape to the true snipes, but more brightly coloured.

- Greater painted-snipe, Rostratula benghalensis

== Jacanas ==
Order: Charadriiformes Family: Jacanidae

The jacanas are a group of tropical waders in the family Jacanidae. They are found throughout the tropics. They are identifiable by their huge feet and claws which enable them to walk on floating vegetation in the shallow lakes that are their preferred habitat.

- Pheasant-tailed jacana, Hydrophasianus chirurgus
- Bronze-winged jacana, Metopidius indicus

== Sandpipers and snipes ==
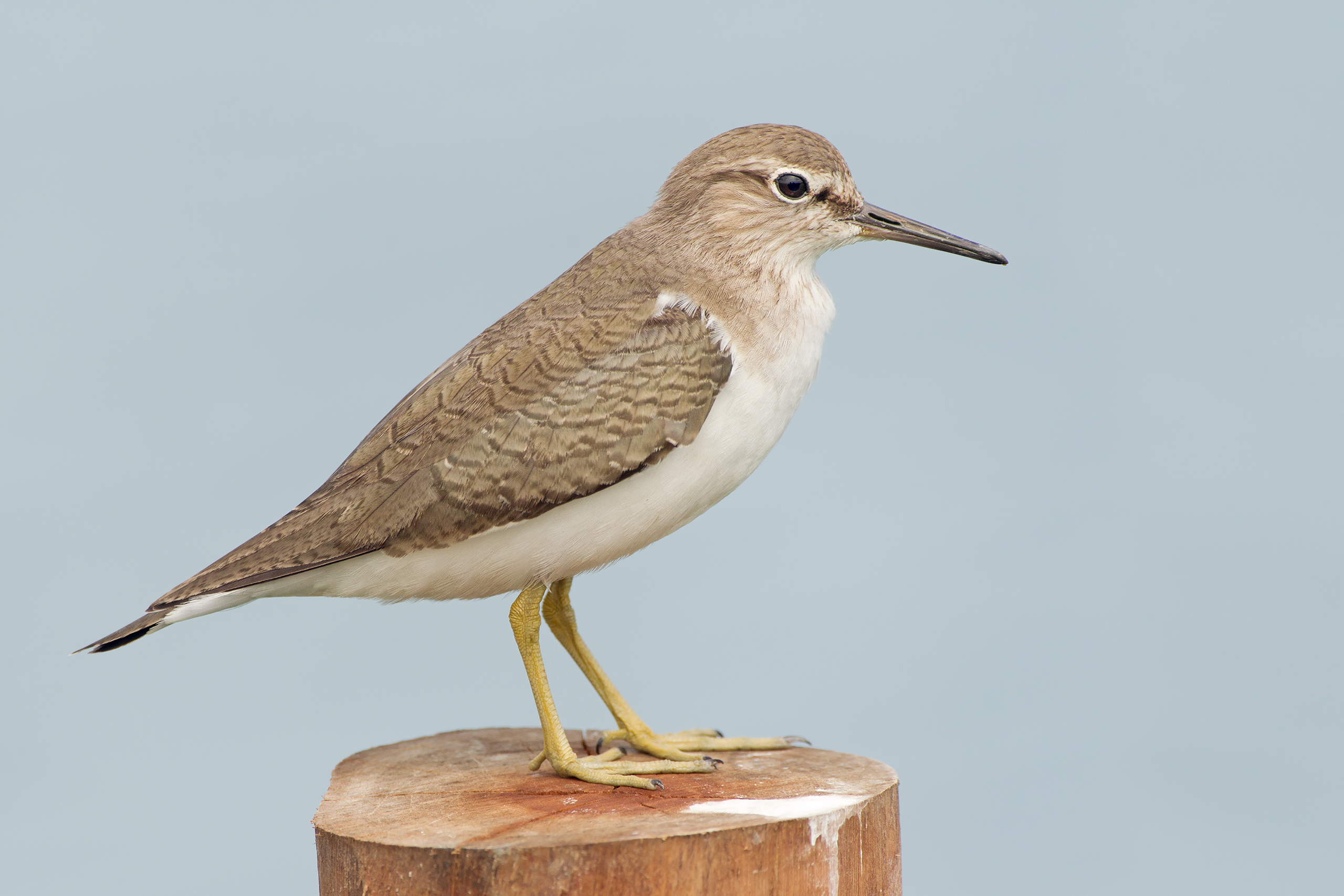
Common sandpiper

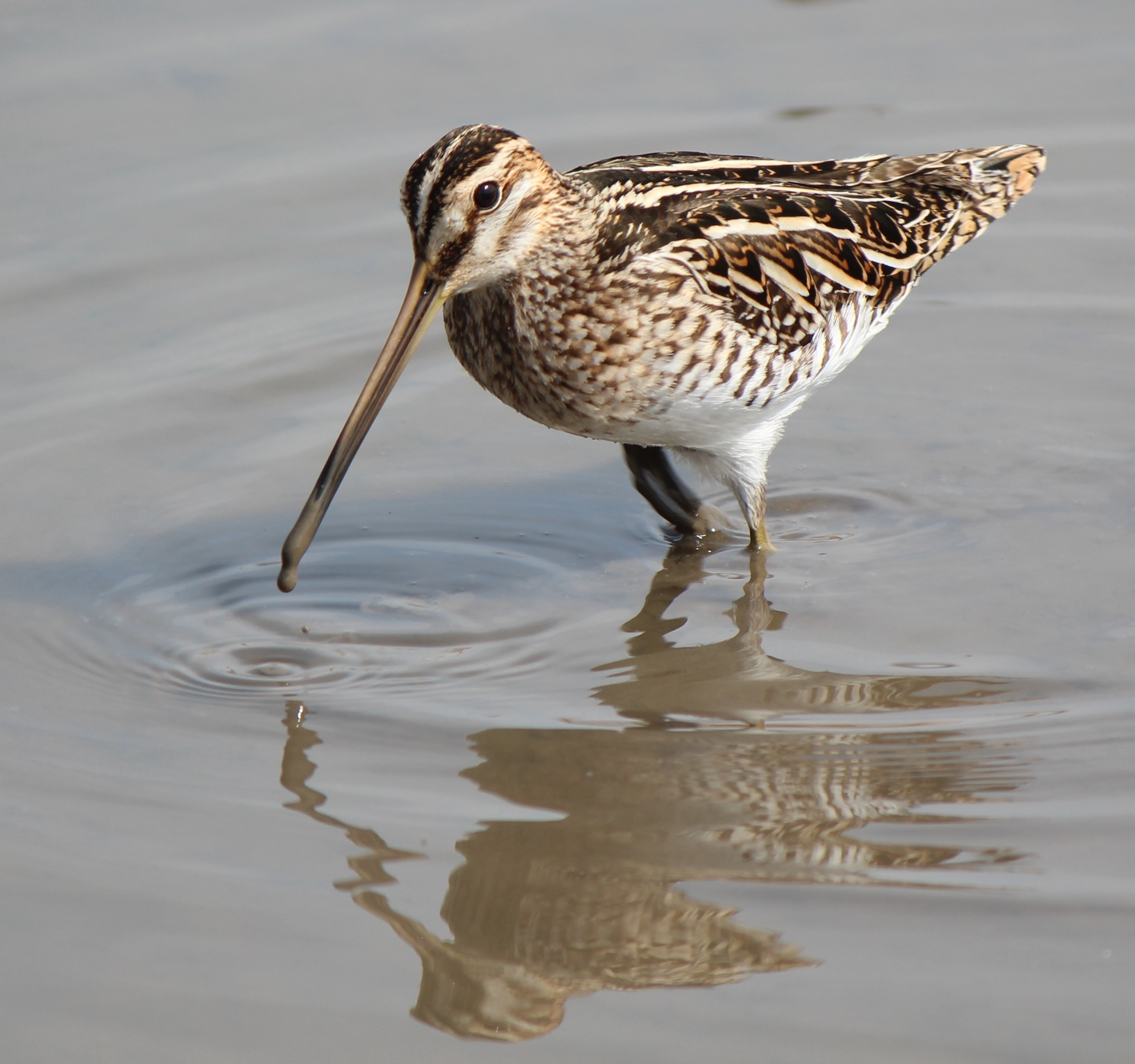
Common snipe

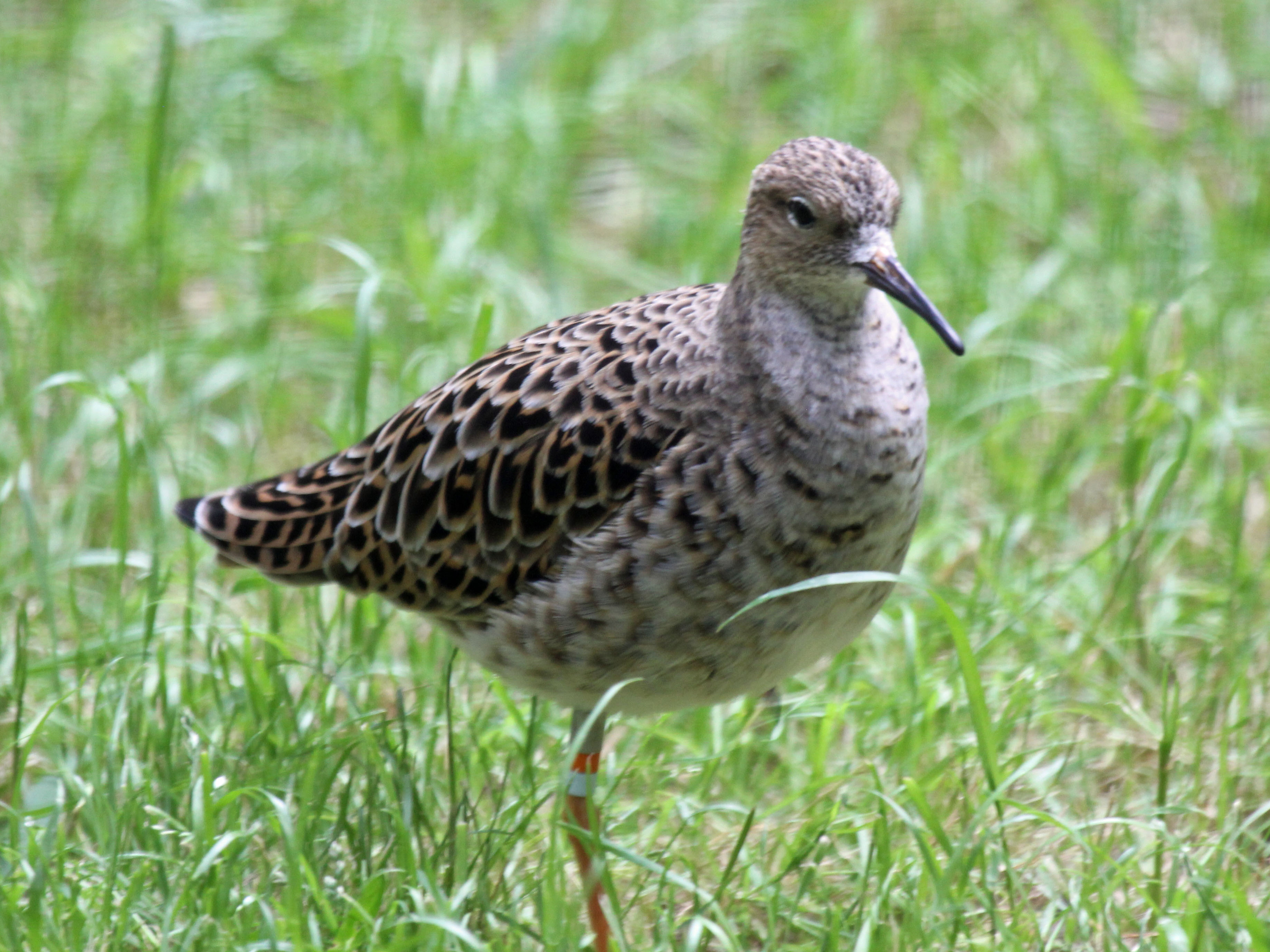
Ruff

Order: Charadriiformes Family: Scolopacidae

Scolopacidae is a large diverse family of small to medium-sized shorebirds including the sandpipers, curlews, godwits, shanks, tattlers, woodcocks, snipes, dowitchers and phalaropes. The majority of these species eat small invertebrates picked out of the mud or soil. Variation in length of legs and bills enables multiple species to feed in the same habitat, particularly on the coast, without direct competition for food.

- Eurasian whimbrel, Numenius phaeopus
- Eurasian curlew, Numenius arquata
- Bar-tailed godwit, Limosa lapponica
- Black-tailed godwit, Limosa limosa
- Ruddy turnstone, Arenaria interpres
- Ruff, Calidris pugnax
- Curlew sandpiper, Calidris ferruginea
- Temminck's stint, Calidris temminckii
- Red-necked stint, Calidris ruficollis
- Sanderling, Calidris alba
- Dunlin, Calidris alpina
- Little stint, Calidris minuta
- Jack snipe, Lymnocryptes minimus
- Pin-tailed snipe, Gallinago stenura
- Common snipe, Gallinago gallinago
- Terek sandpiper, Xenus cinereus
- Red-necked phalarope, Phalaropus lobatus
- Red phalarope, Phalaropus fulicarius (A)
- Common sandpiper, Actitis hypoleucos
- Green sandpiper, Tringa ochropus
- Common redshank, Tringa totanus
- Marsh sandpiper, Tringa stagnatilis
- Wood sandpiper, Tringa glareola
- Spotted redshank, Tringa erythropus
- Common greenshank, Tringa nebularia

== Coursers and pratincoles ==
Order: Charadriiformes Family: Glareolidae

Glareolidae is a family of wading birds comprising the pratincoles, which have short legs, long, pointed wings and long, forked tails, and the coursers, which have long legs, short wings and long, pointed bills which curve downwards.

- Indian courser, Cursorius coromandelicus
- Jerdon's courser, Rhinoptilus bitorquatus
- Collared pratincole, Glareola pratincola
- Oriental pratincole, Glareola maldivarum
- Small pratincole, Glareola lactea

== Gulls, terns, and skimmers ==
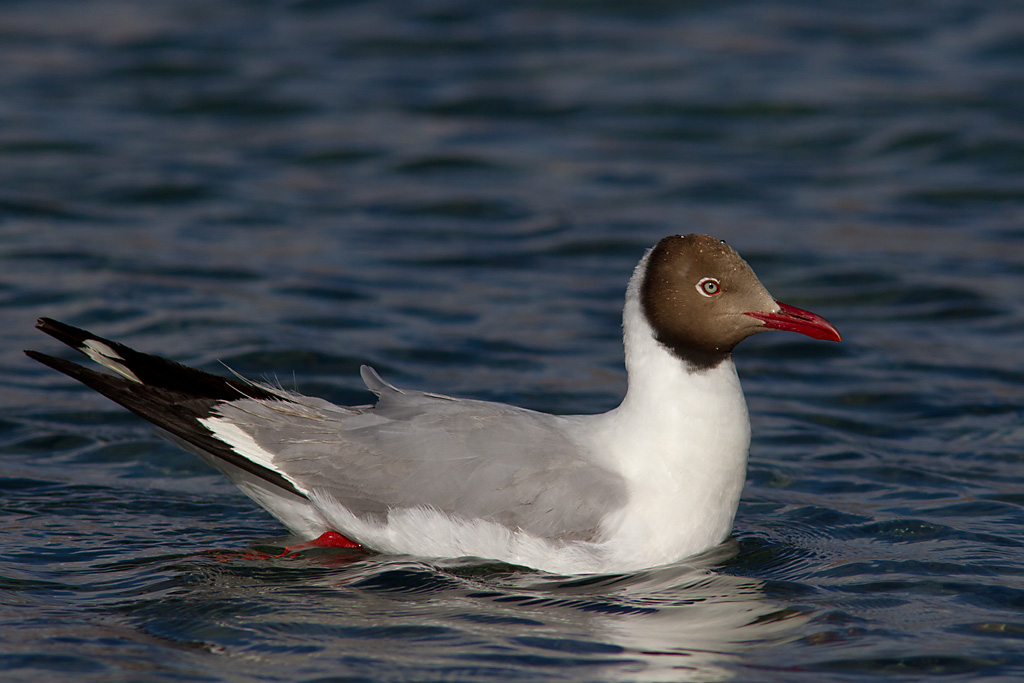
Brown-headed gull

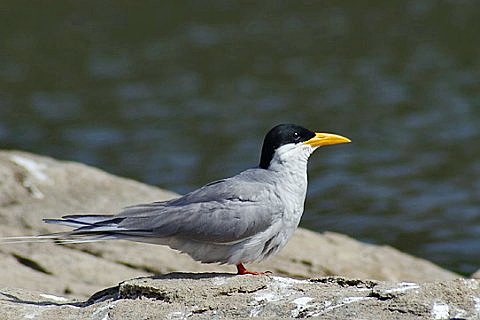
River tern

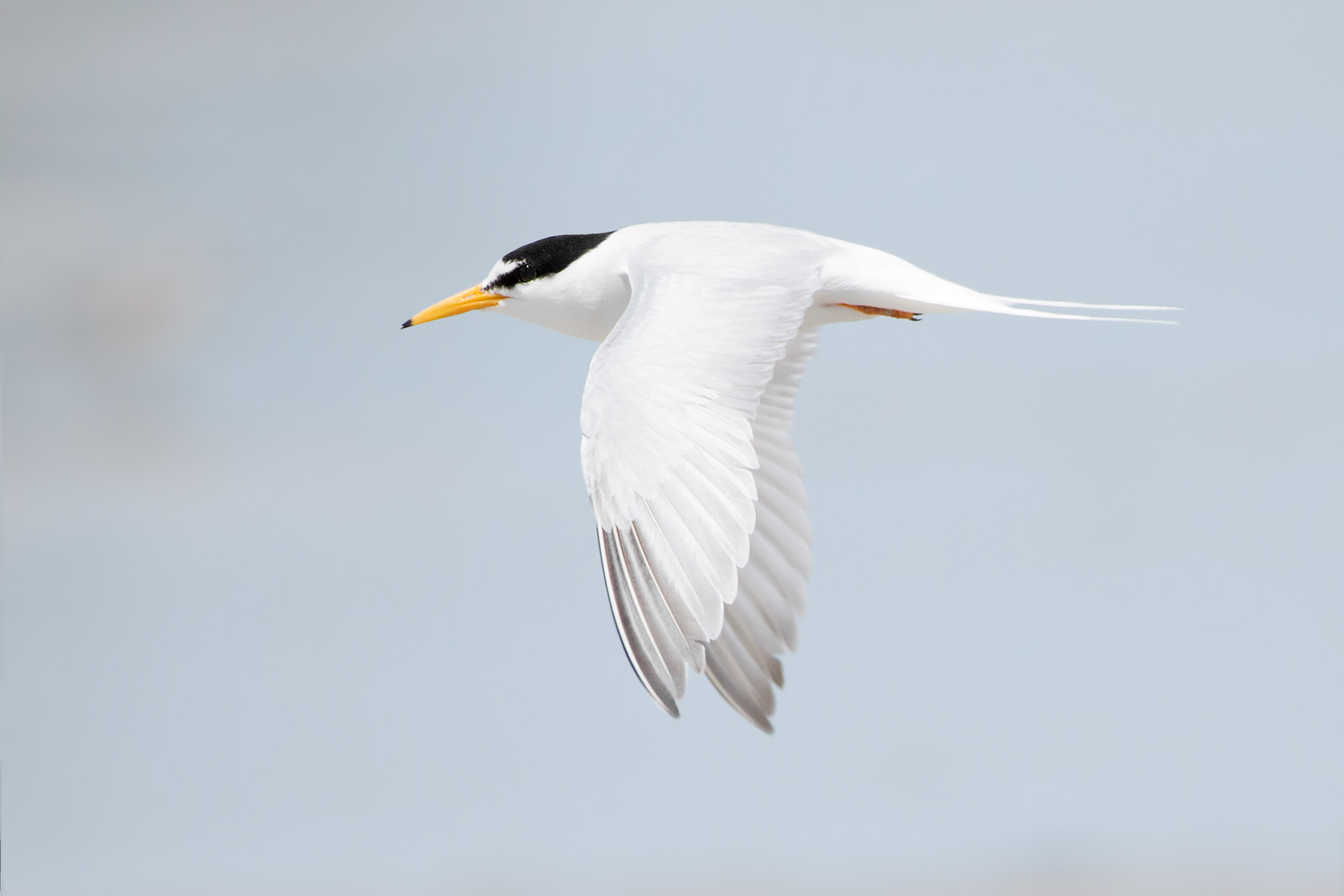
Little tern

Order: Charadriiformes Family: Laridae

Laridae is a family of medium to large seabirds, the gulls, terns, and skimmers. Gulls are typically grey or white, often with black markings on the head or wings. They have stout, longish bills and webbed feet. Terns are a group of generally medium to large seabirds typically with grey or white plumage, often with black markings on the head. Most terns hunt fish by diving but some pick insects off the surface of fresh water. Terns are generally long-lived birds, with several species known to live in excess of 30 years.

- Indian skimmer, Rynchops albicollis
- Slender-billed gull, Chroicocephalus genei
- Brown-headed gull, Chroicocephalus brunnicephalus
- Black-headed gull, Chroicocephalus ridibundus
- Pallas's gull, Ichthyaetus ichthyaetus
- Lesser black-backed gull, Larus fuscus
- Gull-billed tern, Gelochelidon nilotica
- Caspian tern, Hydroprogne caspia
- Little tern, Sternula albifrons
- Sooty tern, Onychoprion fuscatus
- River tern, Sterna aurantia
- Common tern, Sterna hirundo
- Black-bellied tern, Sterna acuticauda
- Whiskered tern, Chlidonias hybrida
- White-winged tern, Chlidonias leucopterus

== Storks ==
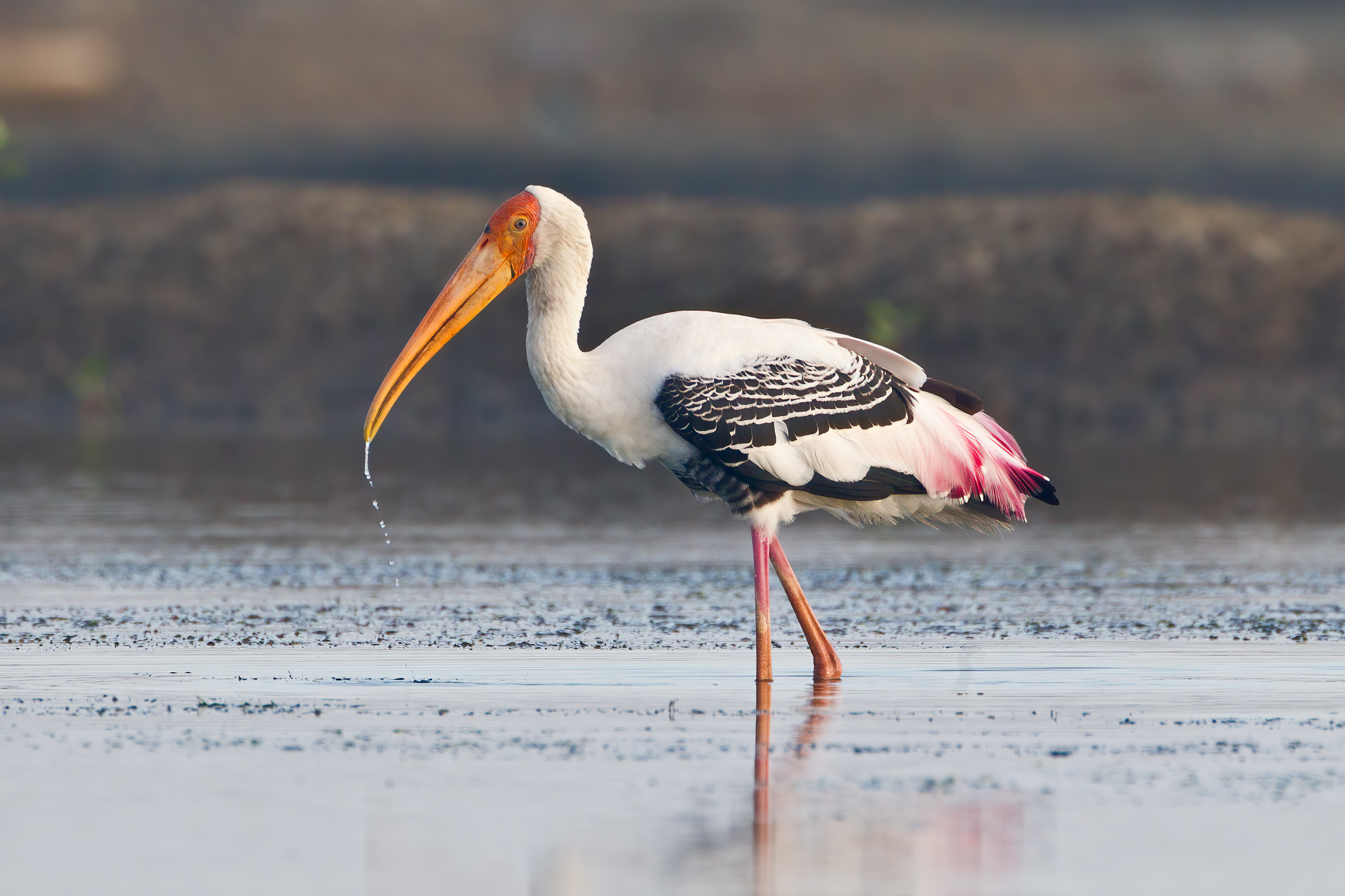
Painted stork

Order: Ciconiiformes Family: Ciconiidae

Storks are large, long-legged, long-necked, wading birds with long, stout bills. Storks are mute, but bill-clattering is an important mode of communication at the nest. Their nests can be large and may be reused for many years. Many species are migratory.

- Painted stork, Mycteria leucocephala
- Asian openbill, Anastomus oscitans
- Black stork, Ciconia nigra
- Woolly-necked stork, Ciconia episcopus
- White stork, Ciconia ciconia
- Black-necked stork, Ephippiorhynchus asiaticus
- Lesser adjutant, Leptoptilos javanicus

== Anhingas and darters ==
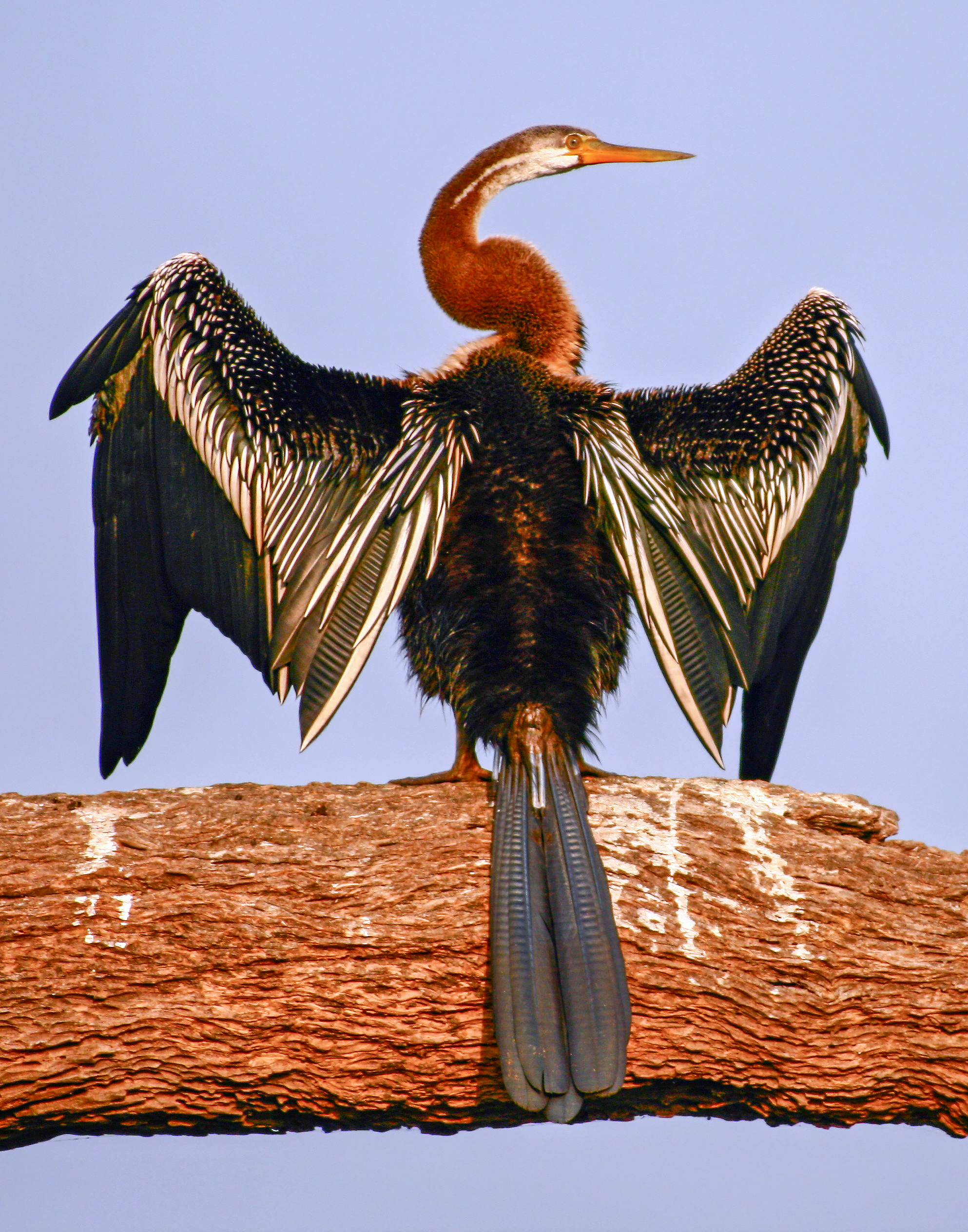
Oriental darter

Order: Suliformes Family: Anhingidae

Anhingas and darters are often called "snake-birds" because of their long thin neck, which gives a snake-like appearance when they swim with their bodies submerged. The males have black and dark-brown plumage, an erectile crest on the nape and a larger bill than the female. The females have much paler plumage especially on the neck and underparts. The darters have completely webbed feet and their legs are short and set far back on the body. Their plumage is somewhat permeable, like that of cormorants, and they spread their wings to dry after diving.

- Oriental darter, Anhinga melanogaster

== Cormorants and shags ==
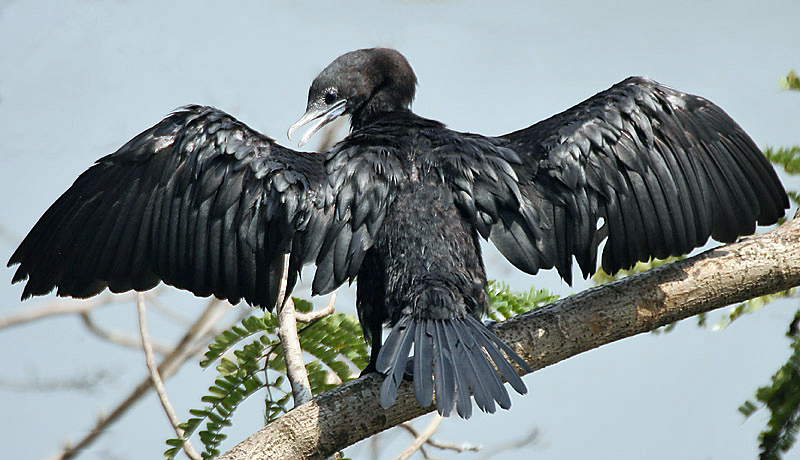
Little cormorant

Order: Suliformes Family: Phalacrocoracidae

Phalacrocoracidae is a family of medium to large coastal, fish-eating seabirds that includes cormorants and shags. Plumage colouration varies, with the majority having mainly dark plumage, some species being black-and-white and a few being colourful.

- Little cormorant, Microcarbo niger
- Indian cormorant, Phalacrocorax fuscicollis
- Great cormorant, Phalacrocorax carbo

== Ibises and spoonbills ==
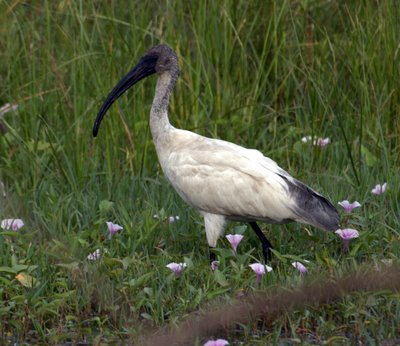
Black-headed ibis

Order: Pelecaniformes Family: Threskiornithidae

Threskiornithidae is a family of large terrestrial and wading birds which includes the ibises and spoonbills. They have long, broad wings with 11 primary and about 20 secondary feathers. They are strong fliers and despite their size and weight, very capable soarers.

- Black-headed ibis, Threskiornis melanocephalus
- Red-naped ibis, Pseudibis papillosa
- Glossy ibis, Plegadis falcinellus
- Eurasian spoonbill, Platalea leucorodia

== Herons and bitterns ==
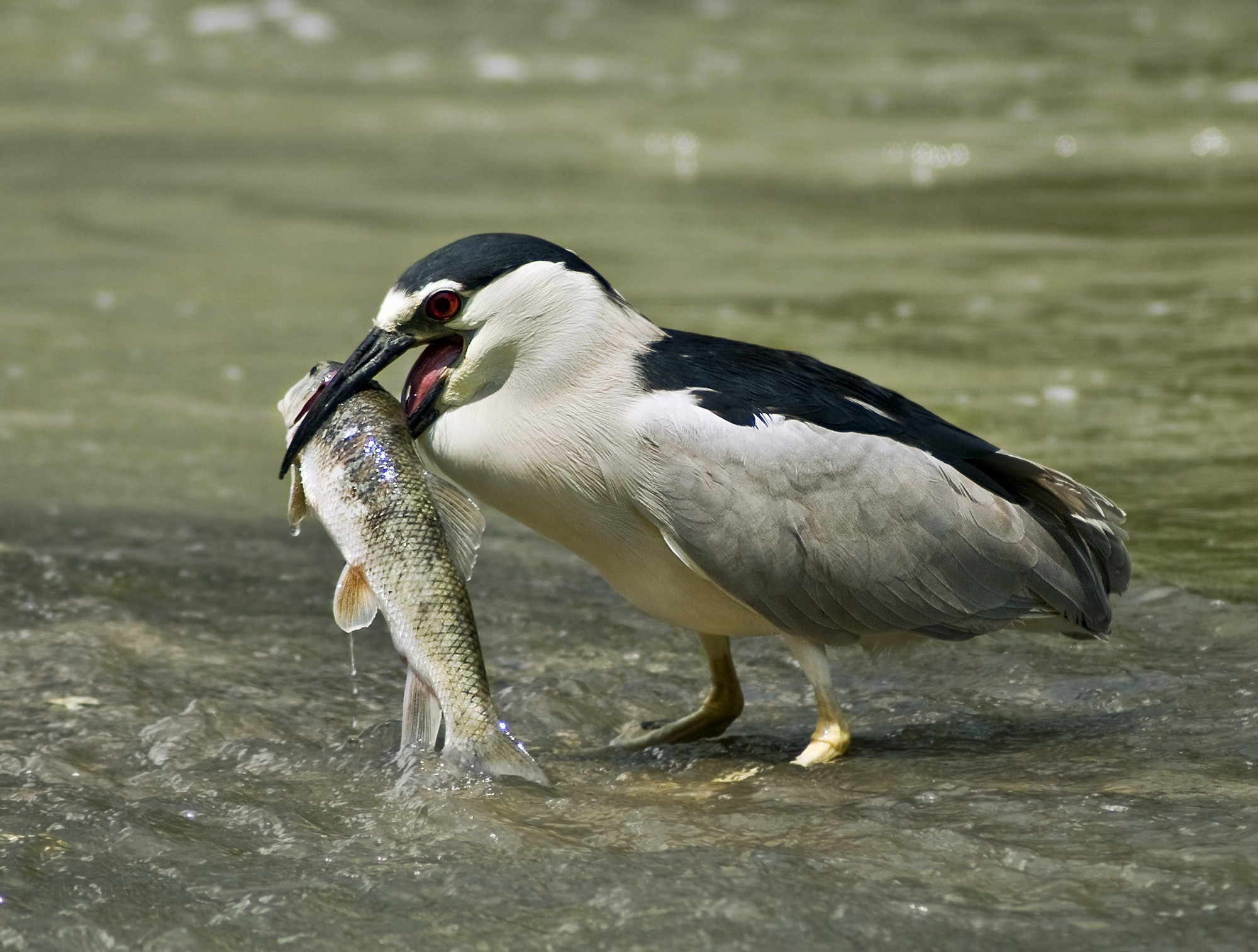
Black-crowned night heron

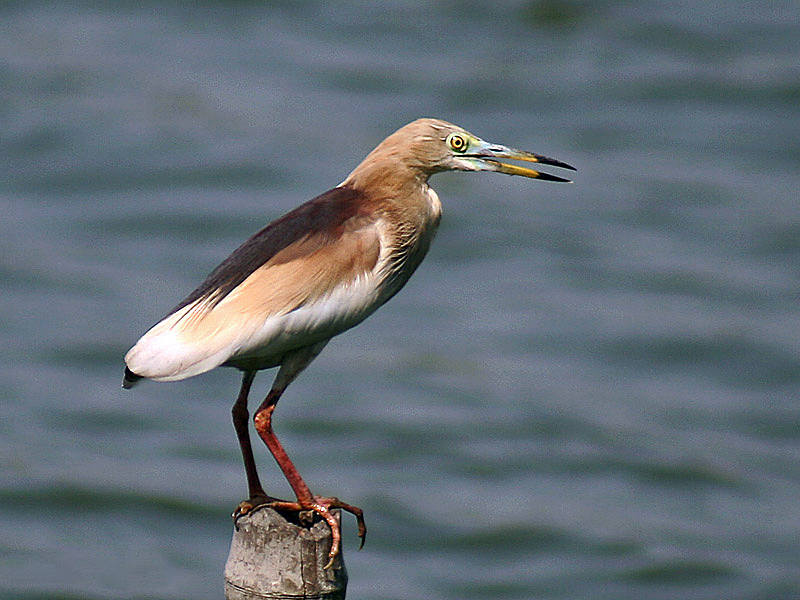
Indian pond heron

Order: Pelecaniformes Family: Ardeidae

The family Ardeidae contains the bitterns, herons and egrets. Herons and egrets are medium to large wading birds with long necks and legs. Bitterns tend to be shorter-necked and more wary. Members of Ardeidae fly with their necks retracted, unlike other long-necked birds such as storks, ibises and spoonbills.

- Eurasian bittern, Botaurus stellaris
- Little bittern, Ixobrychus minutus
- Yellow bittern, Ixobrychus sinensis
- Cinnamon bittern, Ixobrychus cinnamomeus
- Black bittern, Ixobrychus flavicollis
- Black-crowned night heron, Nycticorax nycticorax
- Striated heron, Butorides striata
- Indian pond heron, Ardeola grayii
- Eastern cattle egret, Bubulcus coromandus
- Grey heron, Ardea cinerea
- Purple heron, Ardea purpurea
- Great egret, Ardea alba
- Intermediate egret, Ardea intermedia
- Little egret, Egretta garzetta
- Western reef heron, Egretta gularis

== Pelicans ==
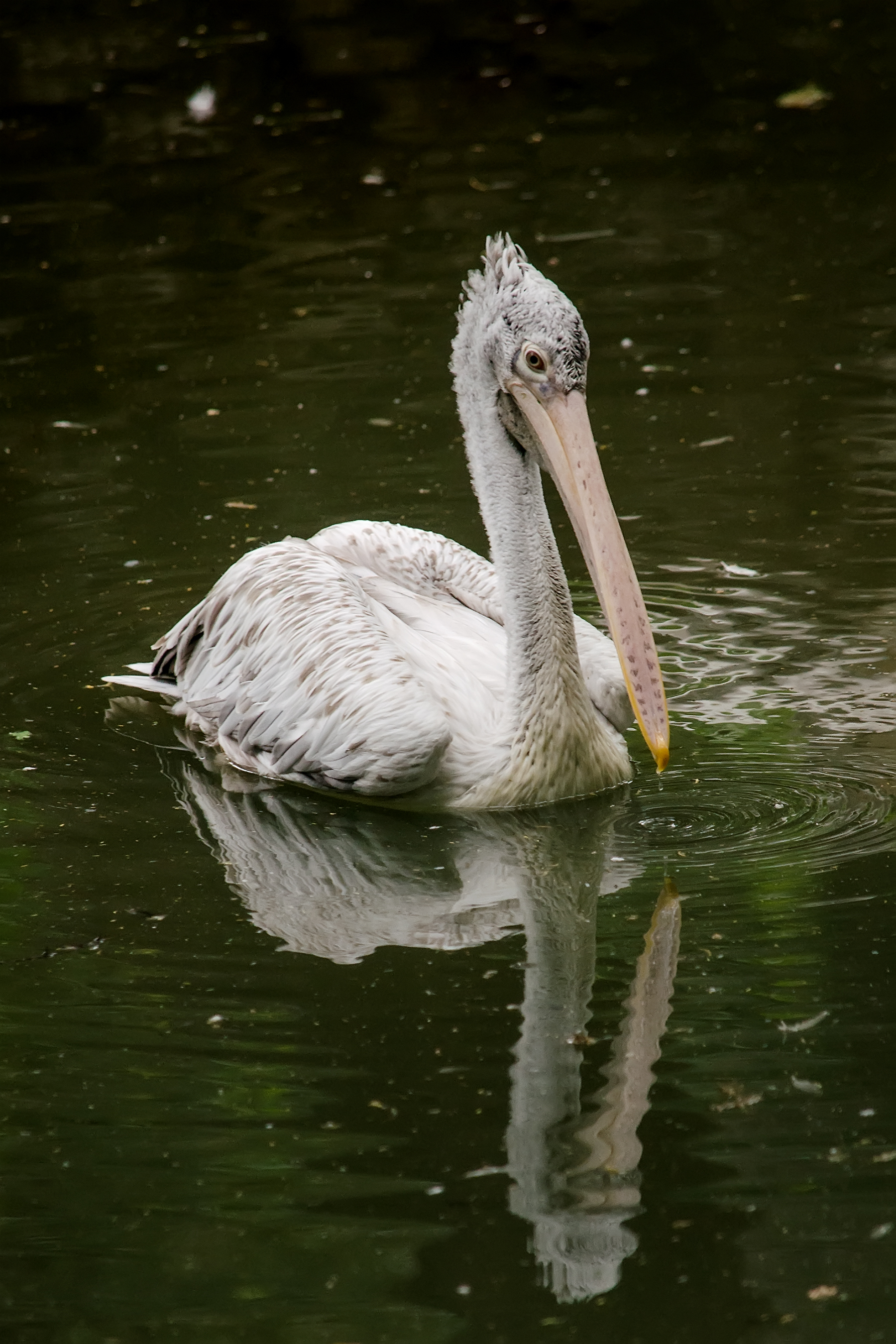
Spot-billed pelican

Order: Pelecaniformes Family: Pelecanidae

Pelicans are large water birds with a distinctive pouch under their beak. As with other members of the order Pelecaniformes, they have webbed feet with four toes.

- Spot-billed pelican, Pelecanus philippensis

== Osprey ==
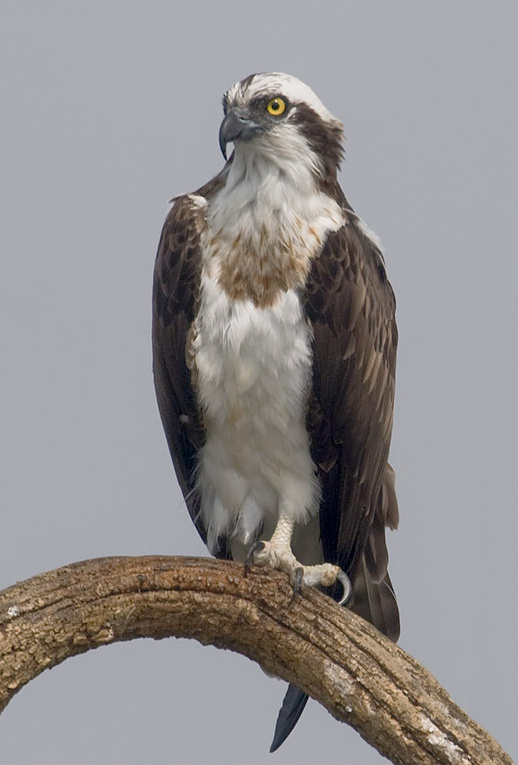
Western osprey

Order: Accipitriformes Family: Pandionidae

The family Pandionidae contains usually only one species, the osprey. The osprey is a medium-large raptor which is a specialist fish-eater.

- Osprey, Pandion haliaetus

== Kites, hawks, and eagles ==
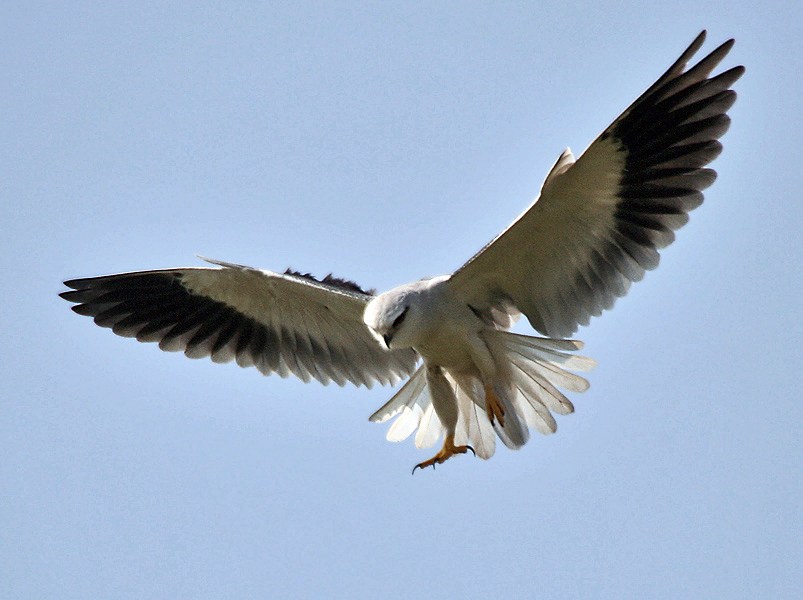
Black-winged kite

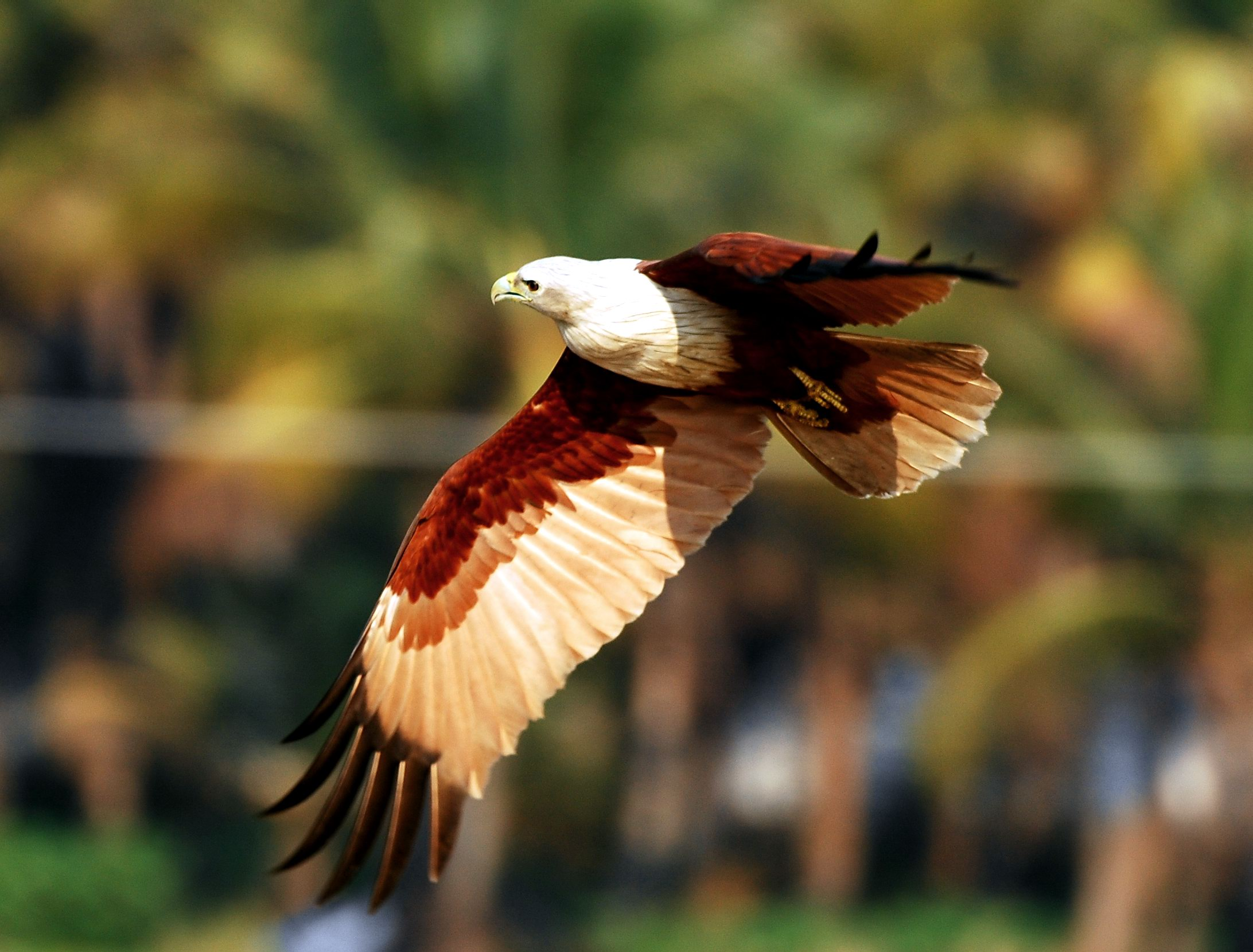
Brahminy kite

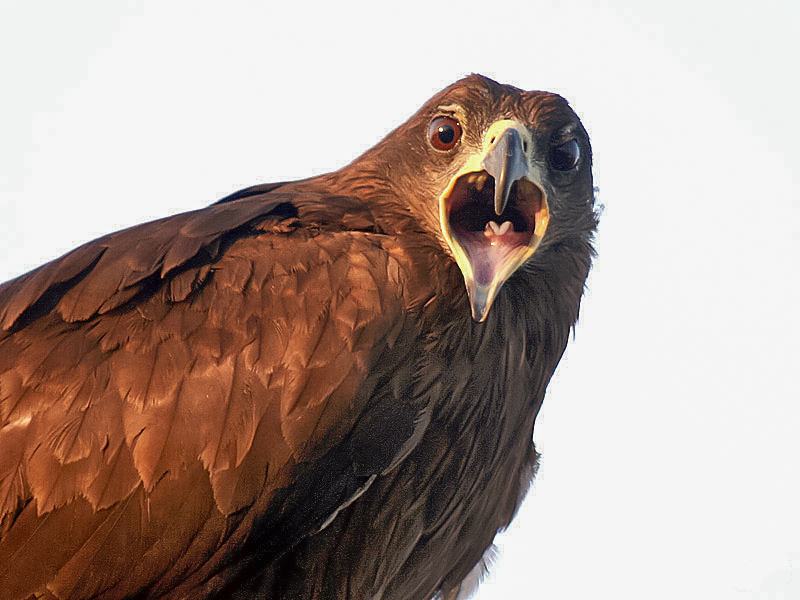
Black kite

Order: Accipitriformes Family: Accipitridae

Accipitridae is a family of birds of prey, which includes hawks, eagles, kites, harriers and Old World vultures. These birds have powerful hooked beaks for tearing flesh from their prey, strong legs, powerful talons and keen eyesight.

- Black-winged kite, Elanus caeruleus
- Egyptian vulture, Neophron percnopterus
- Crested honey buzzard, Pernis ptilorhynchus
- Jerdon's baza, Aviceda jerdoni
- White-rumped vulture, Gyps bengalensis
- Indian vulture, Gyps indicus
- Griffon vulture, Gyps fulvus
- Red-headed vulture, Sarcogyps calvus
- Crested serpent eagle, Spilornis cheela
- Short-toed snake eagle, Circaetus gallicus
- Changeable hawk-eagle, Nisaetus cirrhatus
- Rufous-bellied eagle, Lophotriorchis kienerii
- Black eagle, Ictinaetus malayensis
- Indian spotted eagle, Clanga hastata
- Greater spotted eagle, Clanga clanga
- Booted eagle, Hieraaetus pennatus
- Tawny eagle, Aquila rapax
- Steppe eagle, Aquila nipalensis
- Eastern imperial eagle, Aquila heliaca
- Bonelli's eagle, Aquila fasciata
- Crested goshawk, Accipiter trivirgatus
- Shikra, Accipiter badius
- Besra, Accipiter virgatus
- Eurasian sparrowhawk, Accipiter nisus
- Eurasian goshawk, Accipiter gentilis
- Western marsh harrier, Circus aeruginosus
- Eastern marsh harrier, Circus spilonotus (A)
- Hen harrier, Circus cyaneus
- Pallid harrier, Circus macrourus
- Pied harrier, Circus melanoleucos
- Montagu's harrier, Circus pygargus
- Black kite, Milvus migrans
- Brahminy kite, Haliastur indus
- Grey-headed fish eagle, Haliaeetus ichthyaetus
- White-eyed buzzard, Butastur teesa
- Long-legged buzzard, Buteo rufinus
- Common buzzard, Buteo buteo

== Barn owls ==
Order: Strigiformes Family: Tytonidae

Barn owls are medium to large owls with large heads and characteristic heart-shaped faces. They have long strong legs with powerful talons.

- Eastern barn owl, Tyto javanica
- Eastern grass owl, Tyto longimembris

== Owls ==
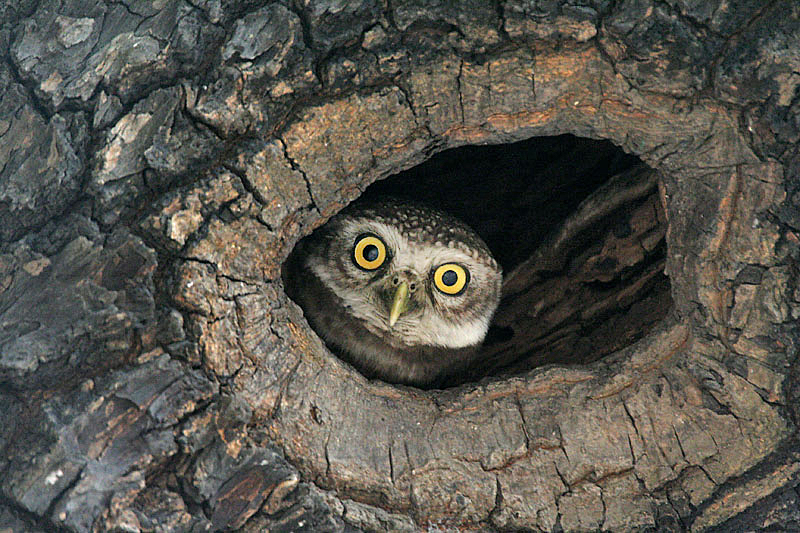
Spotted owlet

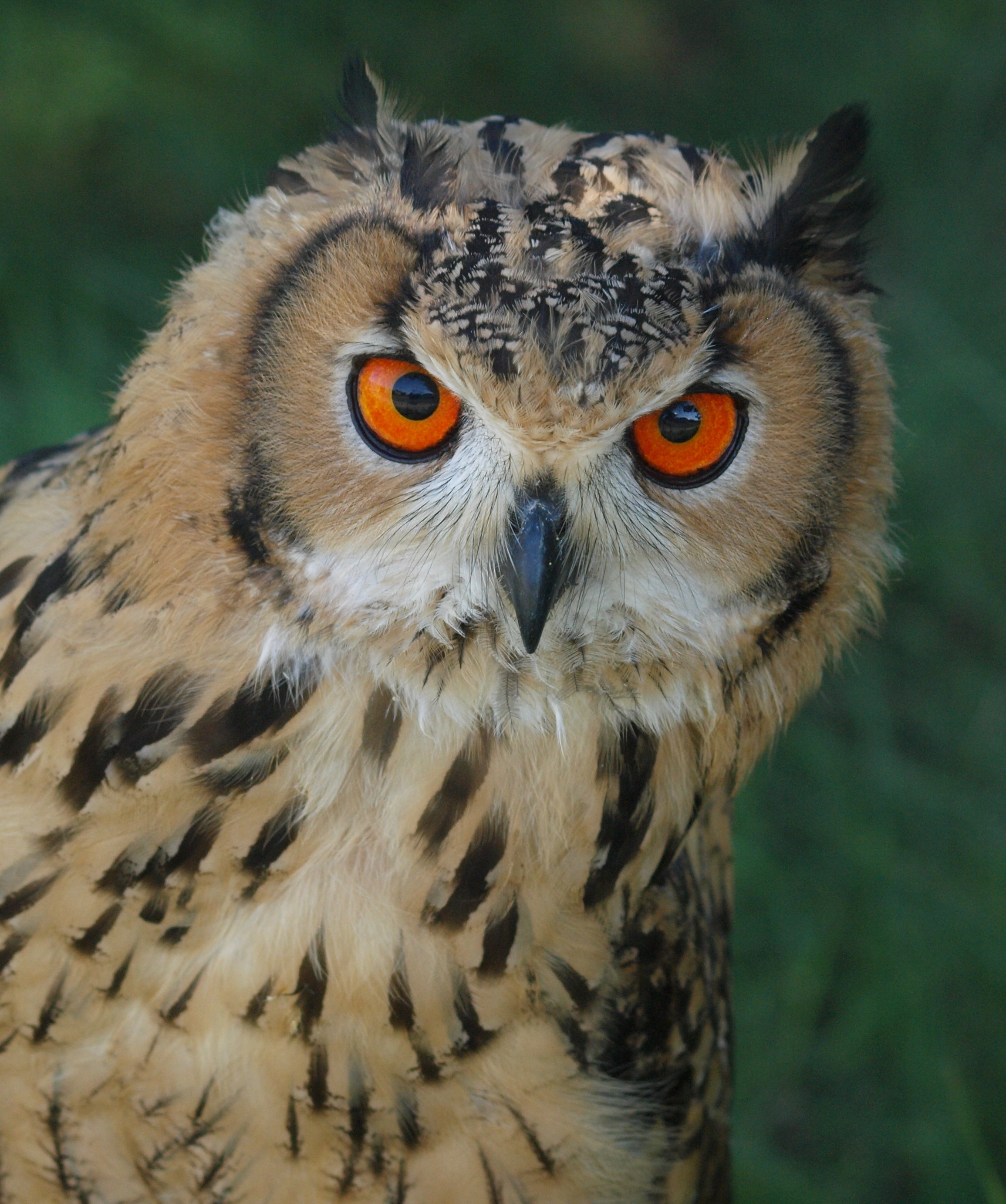
Indian eagle-owl

Order: Strigiformes Family: Strigidae

The typical owls are small to large solitary nocturnal birds of prey. They have large forward-facing eyes and ears, a hawk-like beak and a conspicuous circle of feathers around each eye called a facial disk.

- Indian scops owl, Otus bakkamoena
- Oriental scops owl, Otus sunia
- Indian eagle-owl, Bubo bengalensis
- Spot-bellied eagle-owl, Bubo nipalensis
- Dusky eagle-owl, Bubo coromandus
- Brown fish owl, Ketupa zeylonensis
- Mottled wood owl, Strix ocellata
- Brown wood owl, Strix leptogrammica
- Jungle owlet, Glaucidium radiatum
- Spotted owlet, Athene brama
- Brown boobook, Ninox scutulata
- Short-eared owl, Asio flammeus

== Trogons ==
Order: Trogoniformes Family: Trogonidae

The family Trogonidae includes trogons and quetzals. Found in tropical woodlands worldwide, they feed on insects and fruit, and their broad bills and weak legs reflect their diet and arboreal habits. Although their flight is fast, they are reluctant to fly any distance. Trogons have soft, often colourful, feathers with distinctive male and female plumage.

- Malabar trogon, Harpactes fasciatus

== Hoopoes ==
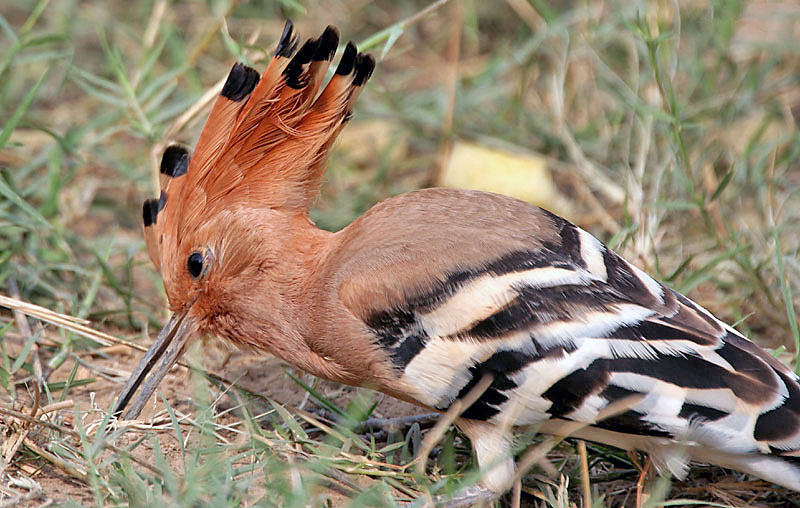
Eurasian hoopoe

Order: Bucerotiformes Family: Upupidae

Hoopoes have black, white and orangey-pink colouring with a large erectile crest on their head.

- Eurasian hoopoe, Upupa epops

== Hornbills ==
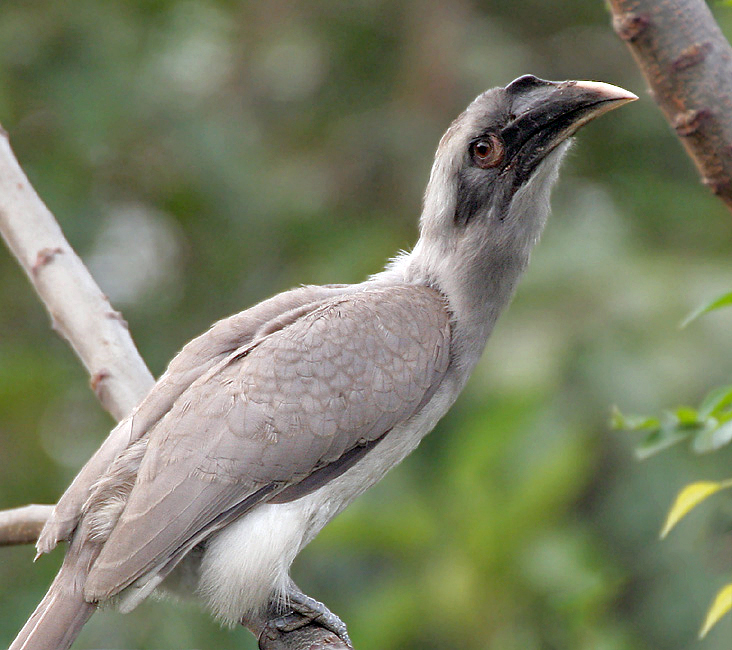
Indian grey hornbill

Order: Bucerotiformes Family: Bucerotidae

Hornbills are a group of birds whose bill is shaped like a cow's horn, but without a twist, sometimes with a casque on the upper mandible. Frequently, the bill is brightly coloured.

- Malabar pied hornbill, Anthracoceros coronatus
- Indian grey hornbill, Ocyceros birostris

== Rollers ==
Order: Coraciiformes Family: Coraciidae

Rollers resemble crows in size and build, but are more closely related to the kingfishers and bee-eaters. They share the colourful appearance of those groups with blues and browns predominating. The two inner front toes are connected, but the outer toe is not.

- Indian roller, Coracias benghalensis
- European roller, Coracias garrulus

== Kingfishers ==
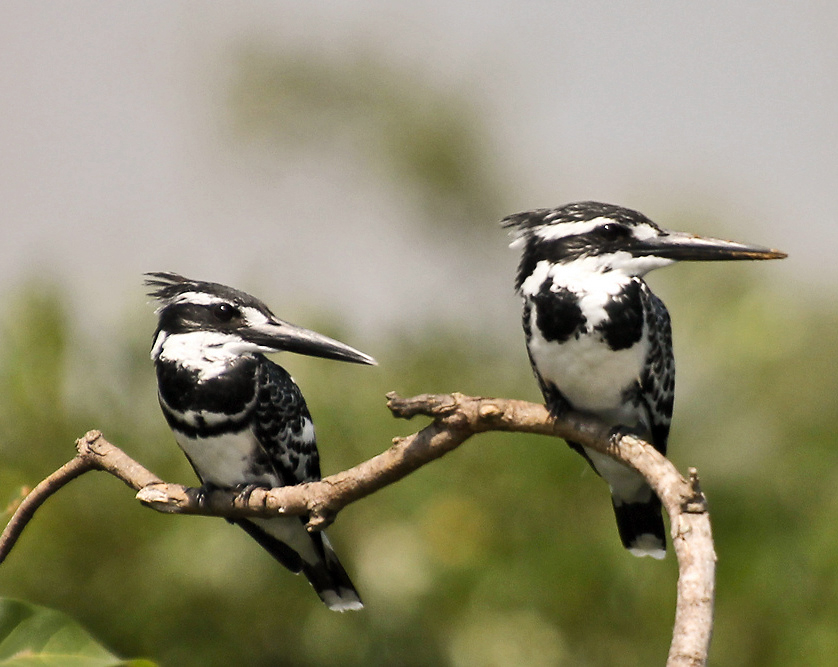
Pied kingfishers

Order: Coraciiformes Family: Alcedinidae

Kingfishers are medium-sized birds with large heads, long, pointed bills, short legs and stubby tails.

- Stork-billed kingfisher, Pelargopsis capensis
- White-throated kingfisher, Halcyon smyrnensis
- Black-capped kingfisher, Halcyon pileata
- Blue-eared kingfisher, Alcedo meninting
- Common kingfisher, Alcedo atthis
- Pied kingfisher, Ceryle rudis

== Bee-eaters ==
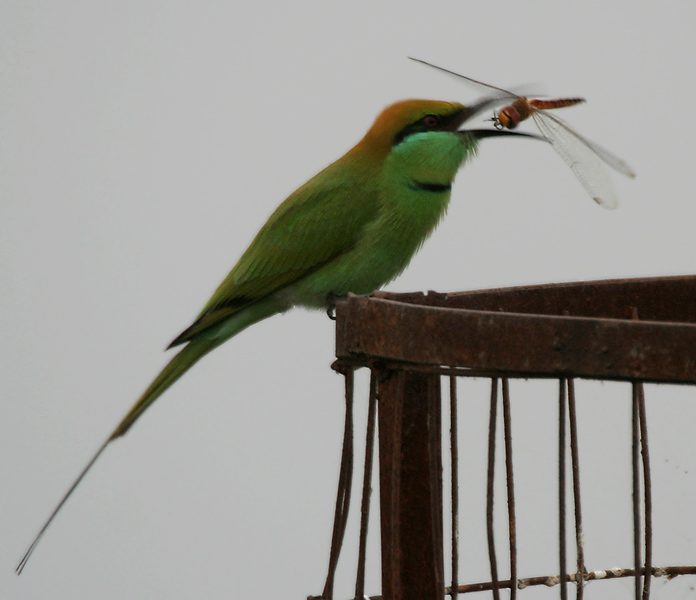
Asian green bee-eater

Order: Coraciiformes Family: Meropidae

The bee-eaters are a group of near passerine birds in the family Meropidae. Most species are found in Africa but others occur in southern Europe, Madagascar, Australia and New Guinea. They are characterised by richly coloured plumage, slender bodies and usually elongated central tail feathers. All are colourful and have long downturned bills and pointed wings, which give them a swallow-like appearance when seen from afar.

- Blue-bearded bee-eater, Nyctyornis athertoni
- Asian green bee-eater, Merops orientalis
- Blue-tailed bee-eater, Merops philippinus
- Chestnut-headed bee-eater, Merops leschenaulti

== Asian barbets ==
Order: Piciformes Family: Megalaimidae

The barbets are plump birds, with short necks and large heads. They get their name from the bristles which fringe their heavy bills. Most species are brightly coloured.

- Brown-headed barbet, Psilopogon zeylanicus
- White-cheeked barbet, Psilopogon viridis
- Coppersmith barbet, Psilopogon haemacephalus

== Woodpeckers ==
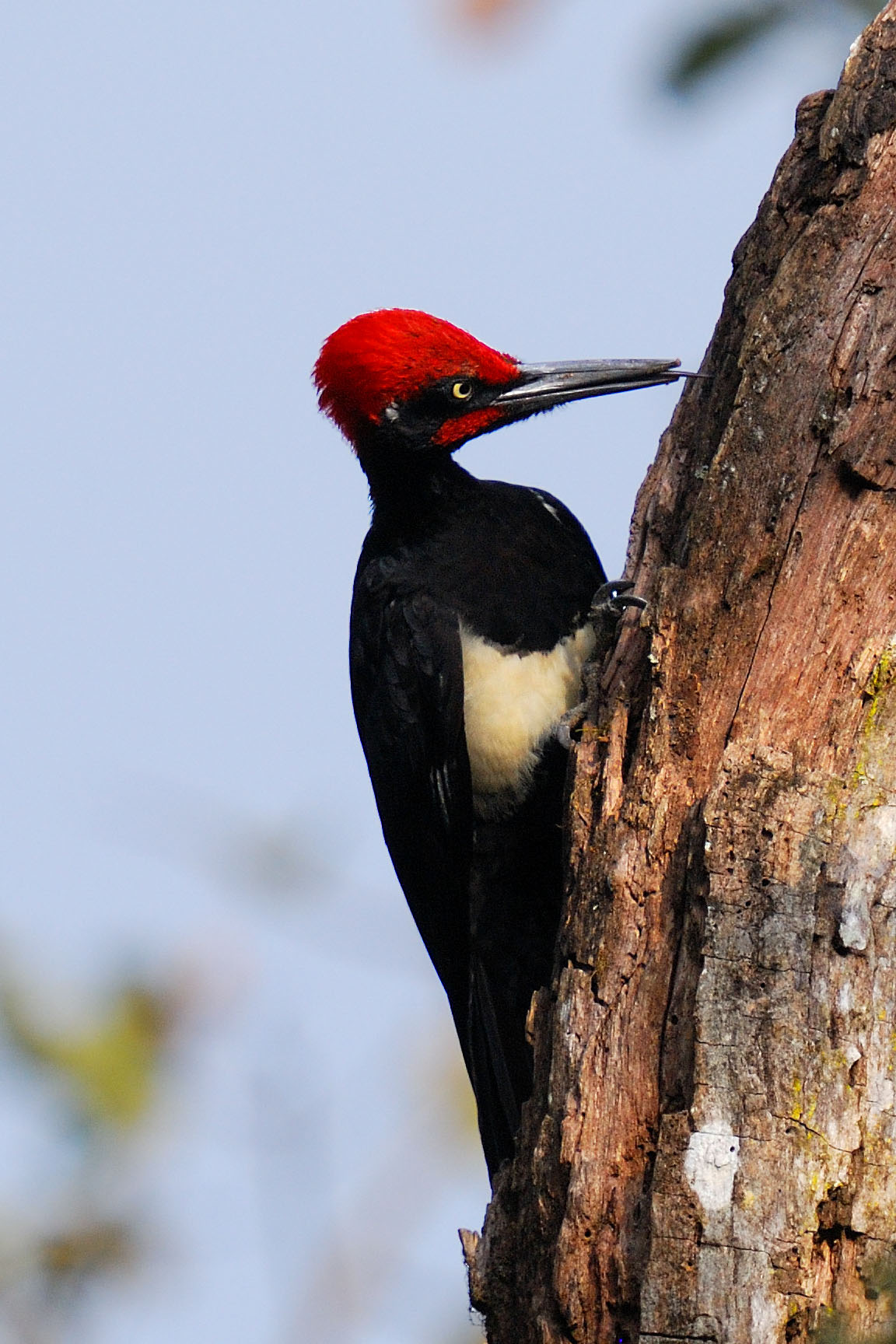
White-bellied woodpecker

Order: Piciformes Family: Picidae

Woodpeckers are small to medium-sized birds with chisel-like beaks, short legs, stiff tails and long tongues used for capturing insects. Some species have feet with two toes pointing forward and two backward, while several species have only three toes. Many woodpeckers have the habit of tapping noisily on tree trunks with their beaks.

- Eurasian wryneck, Jynx torquilla
- Speckled piculet, Picumnus innominatus
- Heart-spotted woodpecker, Hemicircus canente
- Brown-capped pygmy woodpecker, Yungipicus nanus
- Yellow-crowned woodpecker, Leiopicus mahrattensis
- Fulvous-breasted woodpecker, Dendrocopos macei
- White-bellied woodpecker, Dryocopus javensis
- Greater yellownape, Picus flavinucha
- Lesser yellownape, Picus chlorolophus
- Streak-throated woodpecker, Picus xanthopygaeus
- Common flameback, Dinopium javanense
- Black-rumped flameback, Dinopium benghalense
- Greater flameback, Chrysocolaptes guttacristatus
- White-naped woodpecker, Chrysocolaptes festivus
- Rufous woodpecker, Micropternus brachyurus

== Caracaras and falcons ==
Order: Falconiformes Family: Falconidae

Falconidae is a family of diurnal birds of prey. They differ from hawks, eagles, and kites in that they kill with their beaks instead of their talons.

- Lesser kestrel, Falco naumanni
- Common kestrel, Falco tinnunculus
- Red-necked falcon, Falco chiquera
- Amur falcon, Falco amurensis
- Merlin, Falco columbarius
- Eurasian hobby, Falco subbuteo
- Laggar falcon, Falco jugger
- Peregrine falcon, Falco peregrinus

== Old World parrots ==
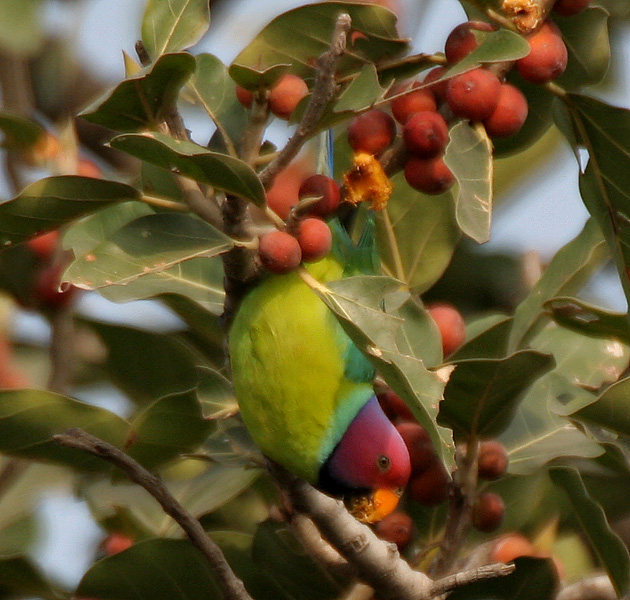
Plum-headed parakeet

Order: Psittaciformes Family: Psittaculidae

Characteristic features of parrots include a strong curved bill, an upright stance, strong legs, and clawed zygodactyl feet. Many parrots are vividly coloured, and some are multi-coloured. In size they range from 8 cm (3.1 in) to 1 m (3.3 ft) in length. Old World parrots are found from Africa east across south and southeast Asia and Oceania to Australia and New Zealand.

- Plum-headed parakeet, Psittacula cyanocephala
- Red-breasted parakeet, Psittacula alexandri
- Alexandrine parakeet, Psittacula eupatria
- Rose-ringed parakeet, Psittacula krameri
- Vernal hanging parrot, Loriculus vernalis

== Pittas ==
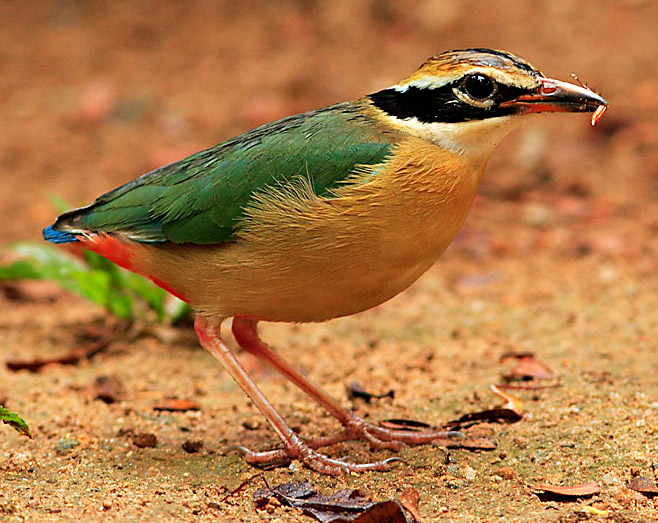
Indian pitta

Order: Passeriformes Family: Pittidae

Pittas are medium-sized by passerine standards and are stocky, with fairly long, strong legs, short tails and stout bills. Many are brightly coloured. They spend the majority of their time on wet forest floors, eating snails, insects and similar invertebrates.

- Indian pitta, Pitta brachyura

== Vangas, helmetshrikes, woodshrikes, and shrike-flycatchers ==
Order: Passeriformes Family: Vangidae

The woodshrikes are similar in build to the shrikes.

- Bar-winged flycatcher-shrike, Hemipus picatus
- Large woodshrike, Tephrodornis gularis
- Common woodshrike, Tephrodornis pondicerianus

== Woodswallows, butcherbirds, and peltops ==
Order: Passeriformes Family: Artamidae

The woodswallows are soft-plumaged, somber-coloured passerine birds. They are smooth, agile flyers with moderately large, semi-triangular wings.

- Ashy woodswallow, Artamus fuscus

== Ioras ==
Order: Passeriformes Family: Aegithinidae

The ioras are bulbul-like birds of open forest or thorn scrub, but whereas that group tends to be drab in colouration, ioras are sexually dimorphic, with the males being brightly plumaged in yellows and greens.

- Common iora, Aegithina tiphia

== Cuckooshrikes ==
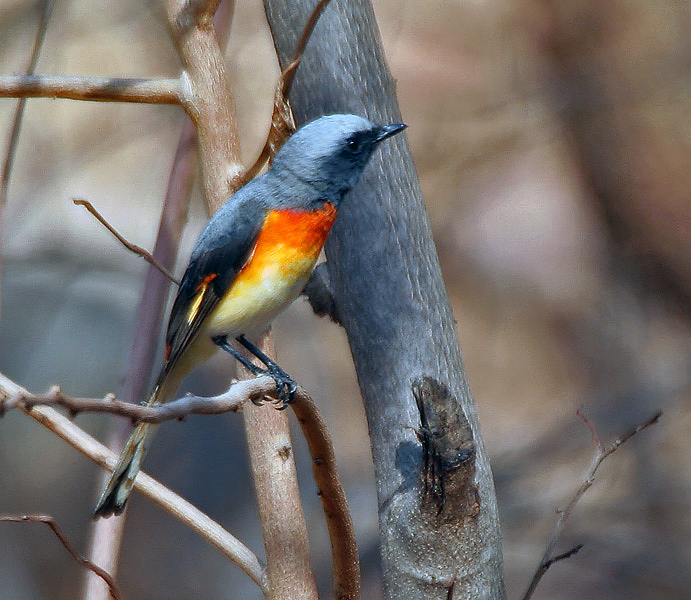
Small minivet

Order: Passeriformes Family: Campephagidae

The cuckooshrikes are small to medium-sized passerine birds. They are predominantly greyish with white and black, although some species are brightly coloured.

- White-bellied minivet, Pericrocotus erythropygius
- Small minivet, Pericrocotus cinnamomeus
- Scarlet minivet, Pericrocotus speciosus
- Ashy minivet, Pericrocotus divaricatus
- Swinhoe's minivet, Pericrocotus cantonensis (A)
- Rosy minivet, Pericrocotus roseus
- Large cuckooshrike, Coracina macei
- Black-winged cuckooshrike, Lalage melaschistos
- Black-headed cuckooshrike, Lalage melanoptera

== Shrikes ==
Order: Passeriformes Family: Laniidae Shrikes are passerine birds known for their habit of catching other birds and small animals and impaling the uneaten portions of their bodies on thorns. A typical shrike's beak is hooked, like a bird of prey.

- Brown shrike, Lanius cristatus
- Isabelline shrike, Lanius isabellinus
- Bay-backed shrike, Lanius vittatus
- Long-tailed shrike, Lanius schach
- Grey-backed shrike, Lanius tephronotus
- Great grey shrike, Lanius excubitor

== Figbirds, orioles, and turnagra ==
Order: Passeriformes Family: Oriolidae

The Old World orioles are colourful passerine birds. They are not related to the New World orioles.

- Black-hooded oriole, Oriolus xanthornus
- Indian golden oriole, Oriolus kundoo
- Black-naped oriole, Oriolus chinensis

== Drongos ==
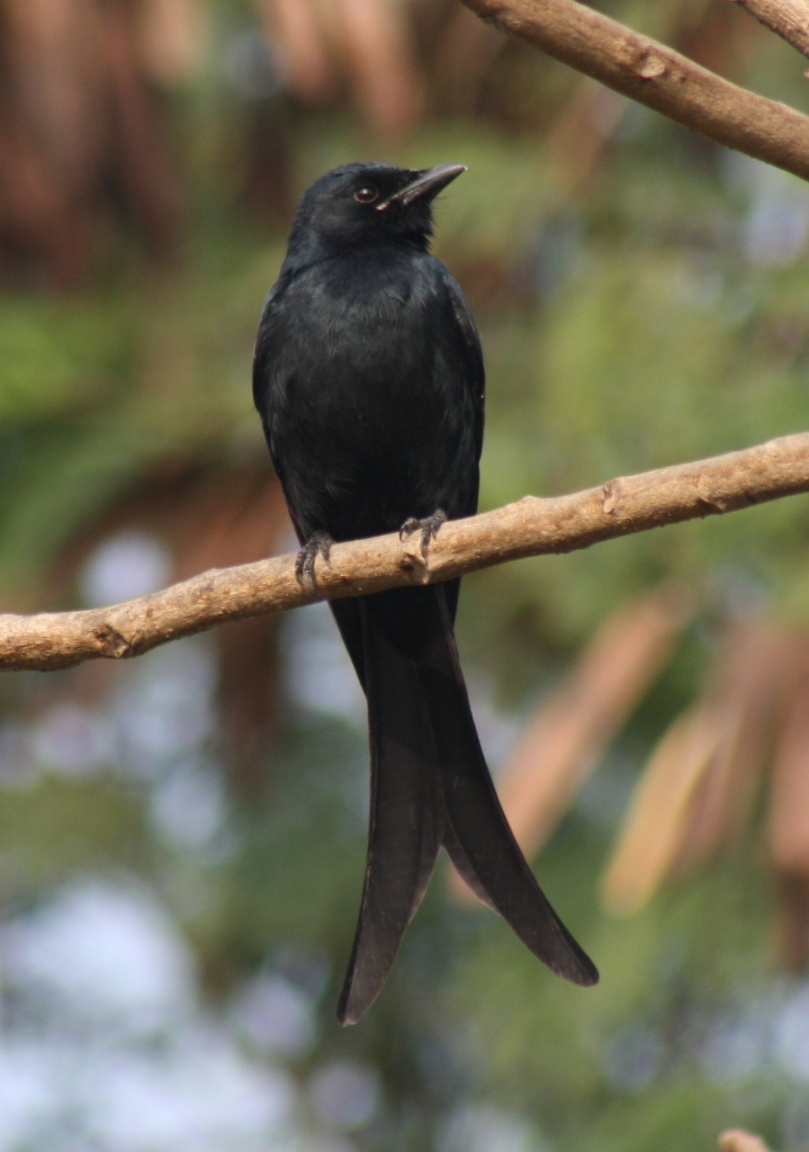
Black drongo

Order: Passeriformes Family: Dicruridae

The drongos are mostly black or dark grey in colour, sometimes with metallic tints. They have long forked tails, and some Asian species have elaborate tail decorations. They have short legs and sit very upright when perched, like a shrike. They flycatch or take prey from the ground.

- Bronzed drongo, Dicrurus aeneus
- Greater racket-tailed drongo, Dicrurus paradiseus
- Hair-crested drongo, Dicrurus hottentottus
- Ashy drongo, Dicrurus leucophaeus
- White-bellied drongo, Dicrurus caerulescens
- Black drongo, Dicrurus macrocercus

== Fantails and silktails ==
Order: Passeriformes Family: Rhipiduridae

The fantails are small insectivorous birds which are specialist aerial feeders.

- White-throated fantail, Rhipidura albicollis
- White-spotted fantail, Rhipidura albogularis
- White-browed fantail, Rhipidura aureola

== Monarchs ==
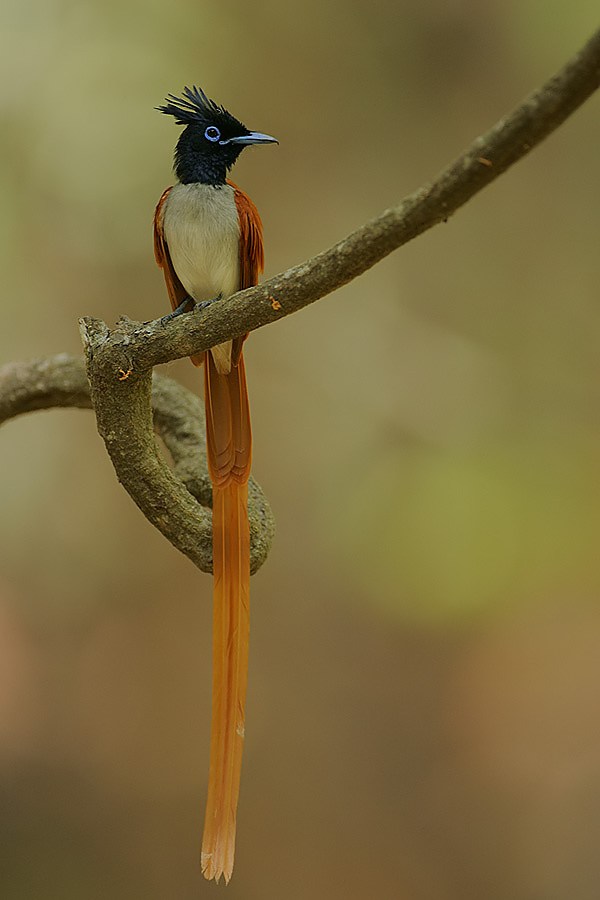
Indian paradise flycatcher

Order: Passeriformes Family: Monarchidae

The monarch flycatchers are small to medium-sized insectivorous passerines which hunt by flycatching.

- Black-naped monarch, Hypothymis azurea
- Indian paradise flycatcher, Terpsiphone paradisi

== Crows and jays ==
Order: Passeriformes Family: Corvidae

The family Corvidae includes crows, ravens, jays, choughs, magpies, treepies, nutcrackers and ground jays. Corvids are above average in size among the Passeriformes, and some of the larger species show high levels of intelligence.

- Rufous treepie, Dendrocitta vagabunda
- Grey treepie, Dendrocitta formosae
- House crow, Corvus splendens
- Indian jungle crow, Corvus culminatus

== Tits and chickadees ==
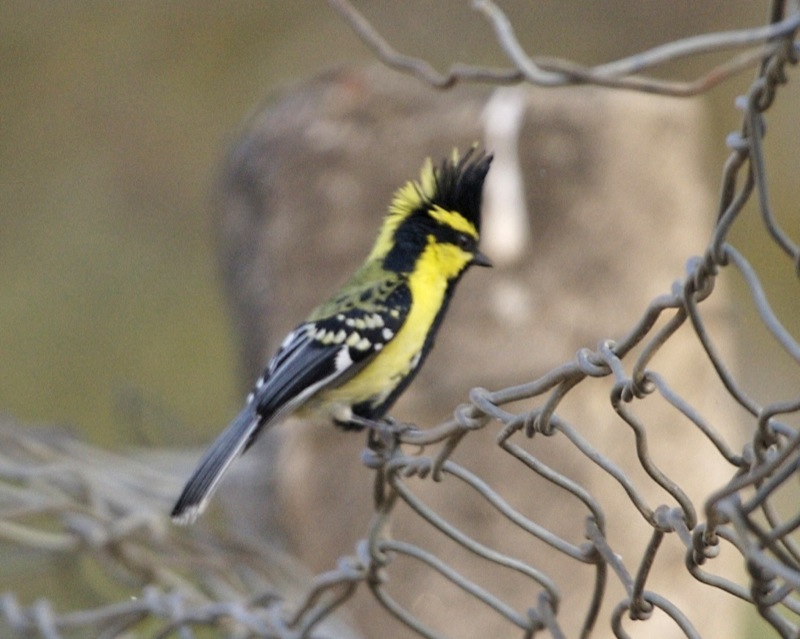
Indian black-lored tit

Order: Passeriformes Family: Paridae

The Paridae are mainly small stocky woodland species with short stout bills. Some have crests. They are adaptable birds, with a mixed diet including seeds and insects.

- Cinereous tit, Parus cinereus
- Himalayan black-lored tit, Machlolophus xanthogenys
- Indian black-lored tit, Machlolophus aplonotus

== Larks ==
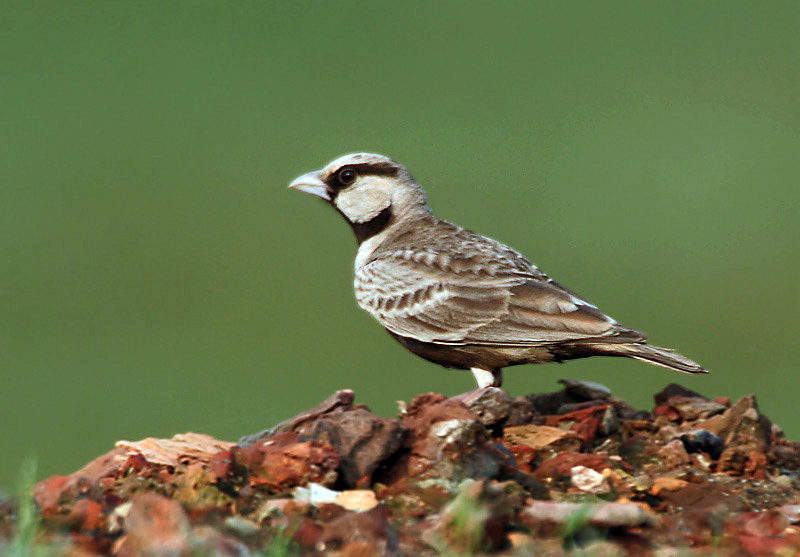
Ashy-crowned sparrow-lark

Order: Passeriformes Family: Alaudidae

Larks are small terrestrial birds with often extravagant songs and display flights. Most larks are fairly dull in appearance. Their food is insects and seeds.

- Rufous-tailed lark, Ammomanes phoenicura
- Ashy-crowned sparrow-lark, Eremopterix griseus
- Singing bush lark, Mirafra cantillans
- Indian bush lark, Mirafra erythroptera
- Jerdon's bush lark, Mirafra affinis
- Oriental skylark, Alauda gulgula
- Sykes's lark, Galerida deva
- Crested lark, Galerida cristata
- Mongolian short-toed lark, Calandrella dukhunensis
- Greater short-toed lark, Calandrella brachydactyla

== Bulbuls ==
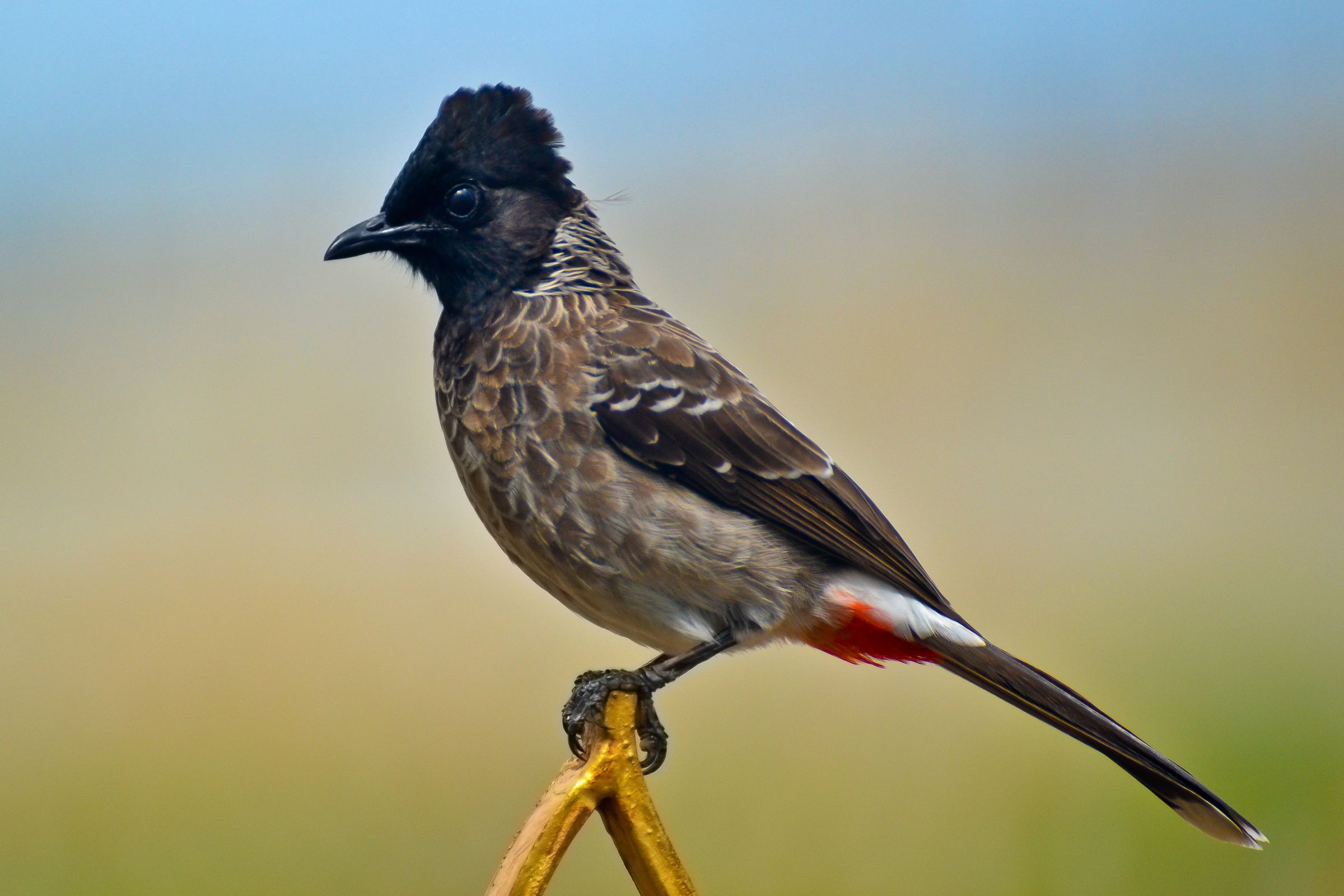
Red-vented bulbul

Order: Passeriformes Family: Pycnonotidae

Bulbuls are medium-sized songbirds. Some are colourful with yellow, red or orange vents, cheeks, throats or supercilia, but most are drab, with uniform olive-brown to black plumage. Some species have distinct crests.

- Yellow-browed bulbul, Acritillas indica
- Black-crested bulbul, Rubigula flaviventris
- White-browed bulbul, Pycnonotus luteolus
- Yellow-throated bulbul, Pycnonotus xantholaemus
- Red-whiskered bulbul, Pycnonotus jocosus
- Red-vented bulbul, Pycnonotus cafer

== Swallows and martins ==
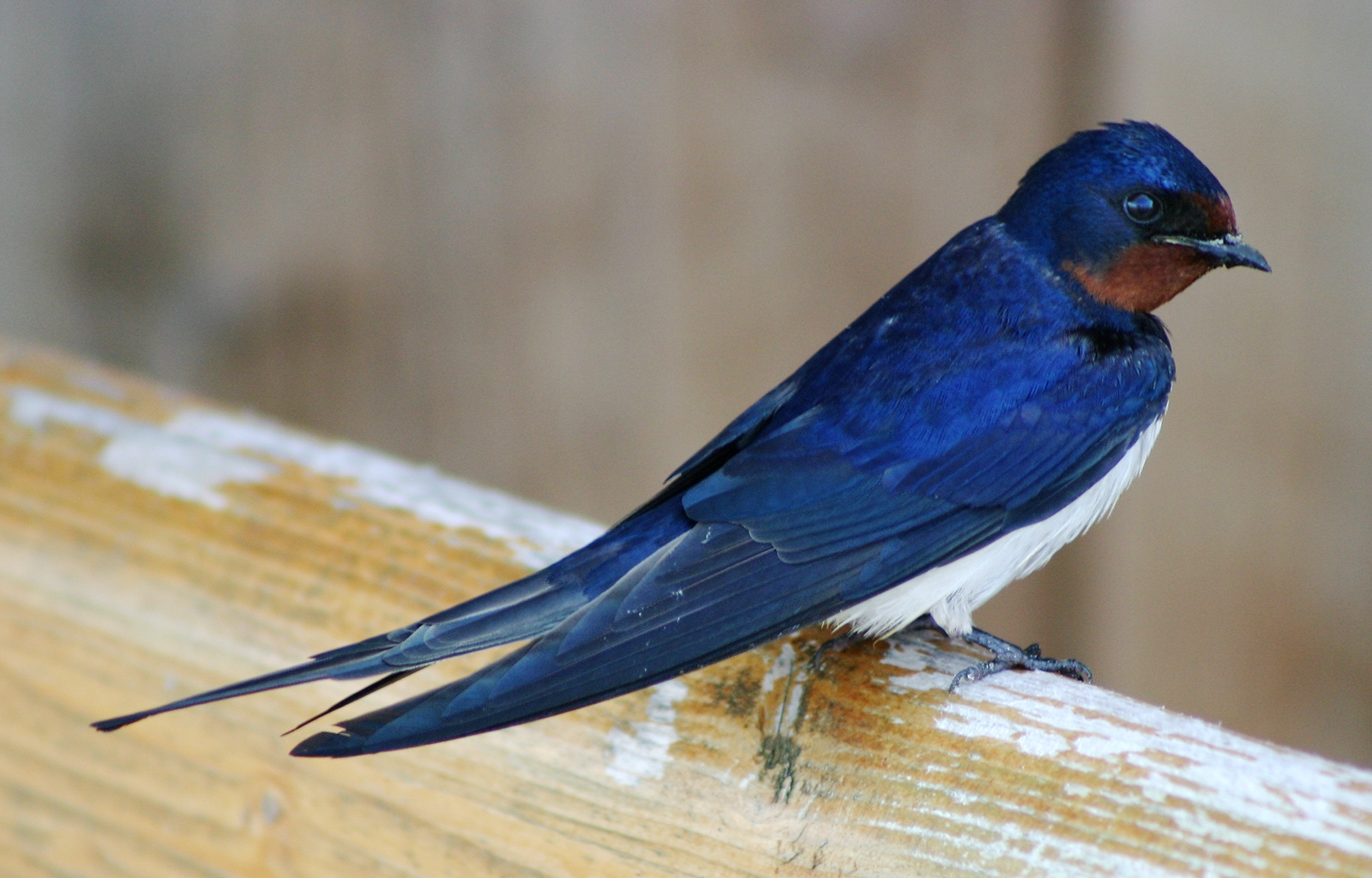
Barn swallow

Order: Passeriformes Family: Hirundinidae

The family Hirundinidae is adapted to aerial feeding. They have a slender streamlined body, long pointed wings and a short bill with a wide gape. The feet are adapted to perching rather than walking, and the front toes are partially joined at the base.

- Grey-throated martin, Riparia chinensis
- Sand martin, Riparia riparia
- Barn swallow, Hirundo rustica
- Wire-tailed swallow, Hirundo smithii
- Eurasian crag martin, Ptyonoprogne concolor
- Dusky crag martin, Ptyonoprogne concolor
- Common house martin, Delichon urbicum
- Asian house martin, Delichon dasypus
- Eastern red-rumped swallow, Cecropis daurica
- Streak-throated swallow, Petrochelidon fluvicola

== Leaf warblers and allies ==
Order: Passeriformes Family: Phylloscopidae

Leaf warblers are a family of small insectivorous birds found mostly in Eurasia and ranging into Wallacea and Africa. The species are of various sizes, often green-plumaged above and yellow below, or more subdued with greyish-green to greyish-brown colours.

- Hume's leaf warbler, Phylloscopus humei
- Yellow-browed warbler, Phylloscopus inornatus
- Tytler's leaf warbler, Phylloscopus tytleri
- Sulphur-bellied warbler, Phylloscopus griseolus
- Tickell's leaf warbler, Phylloscopus affinis
- Plain leaf warbler, Phylloscopus neglectus
- Common chiffchaff, Phylloscopus collybita
- Green-crowned warbler, Phylloscopus burkii
- Green warbler, Phylloscopus nitidus
- Greenish warbler, Phylloscopus trochiloides
- Large-billed leaf warbler, Phylloscopus magnirostris
- Western crowned warbler, Phylloscopus occipitalis
- Blyth's leaf warbler, Phylloscopus reguloides

== Reed warblers, Grauer's warbler, and allies ==
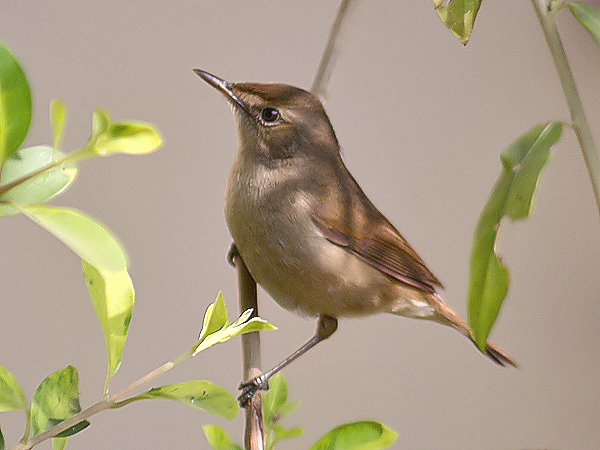
Blyth's reed warbler

Order: Passeriformes Family: Acrocephalidae

The members of this family are usually rather large for "warblers". Most are rather plain olivaceous brown above with much yellow to beige below. They are usually found in open woodland, reedbeds, or tall grass. The family occurs mostly in southern to western Eurasia and surroundings, but it also ranges far into the Pacific, with some species in Africa.

- Clamorous reed warbler, Acrocephalus stentoreus
- Paddyfield warbler, Acrocephalus agricola
- Blyth's reed warbler, Acrocephalus dumetorum
- Thick-billed warbler, Arundinax aedon
- Booted warbler, Iduna caligata
- Sykes's warbler, Iduna rama

== Grassbirds and allies ==
Order: Passeriformes Family: Locustellidae

Locustellidae are a family of small insectivorous songbirds found mainly in Eurasia, Africa, and the Australian region. They are smallish birds with tails that are usually long and pointed, and tend to be drab brownish or buffy all over.

- Long-billed bush warbler, Locustella major
- Common grasshopper warbler, Locustella naevia
- Bristled grassbird, Schoenicola striatus

== Cisticolas and allies ==
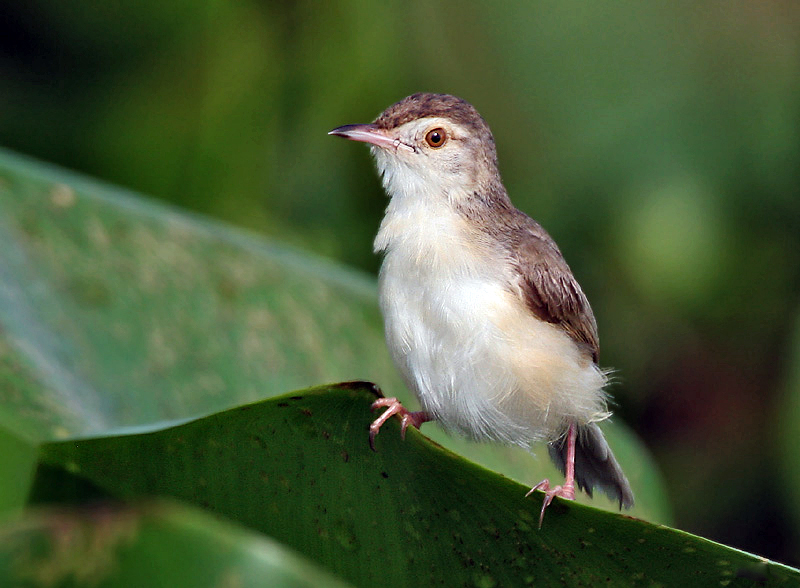
Plain prinia

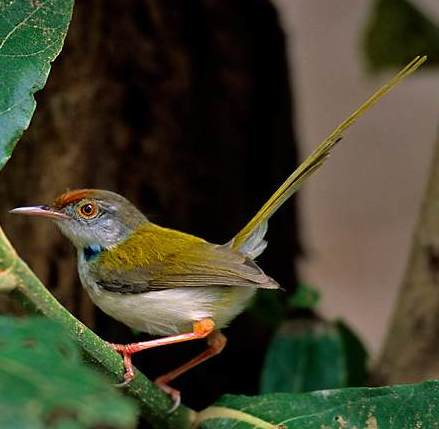
Common tailorbird

Order: Passeriformes Family: Cisticolidae

The Cisticolidae are warblers found mainly in warmer southern regions of the Old World. They are generally very small birds of drab brown or grey appearance found in open country such as grassland or scrub.

- Zitting cisticola, Cisticola juncidis
- Rufous-fronted prinia, Prinia buchanani
- Rufescent prinia, Prinia rufescens
- Grey-breasted prinia, Prinia hodgsonii
- Jungle prinia, Prinia sylvatica
- Ashy prinia, Prinia socialis
- Plain prinia, Prinia inornata
- Common tailorbird, Orthotomus sutorius

== Sylviid babblers ==
Order: Passeriformes Family: Sylviidae

The family Sylviidae is a group of small insectivorous passerine birds. They mainly occur as breeding species, as the common name implies, in Europe, Asia and, to a lesser extent, Africa. Most are of generally undistinguished appearance, but many have distinctive songs.

- Lesser whitethroat, Curruca curruca
- Hume's whitethroat, Curruca althaea
- Eastern Orphean warbler, Curruca crassirostris

== Parrotbills and allies ==
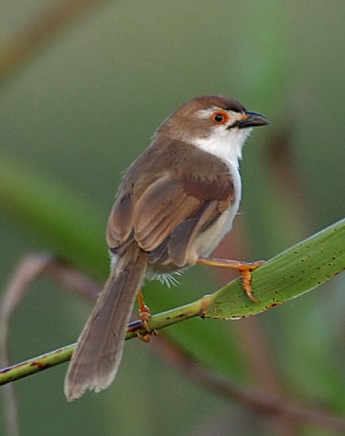
Yellow-eyed babbler

Order: Passeriformes Family: Paradoxornithidae

The parrotbills are a group of peculiar birds native to East and Southeast Asia, though feral populations exist elsewhere. They are generally small, long-tailed birds which inhabit reedbeds and similar habitat. They feed mainly on seeds, e.g. of grasses, to which their bill, as the name implies, is well-adapted.

- Yellow-eyed babbler, Chrysomma sinense

== White-eyes ==
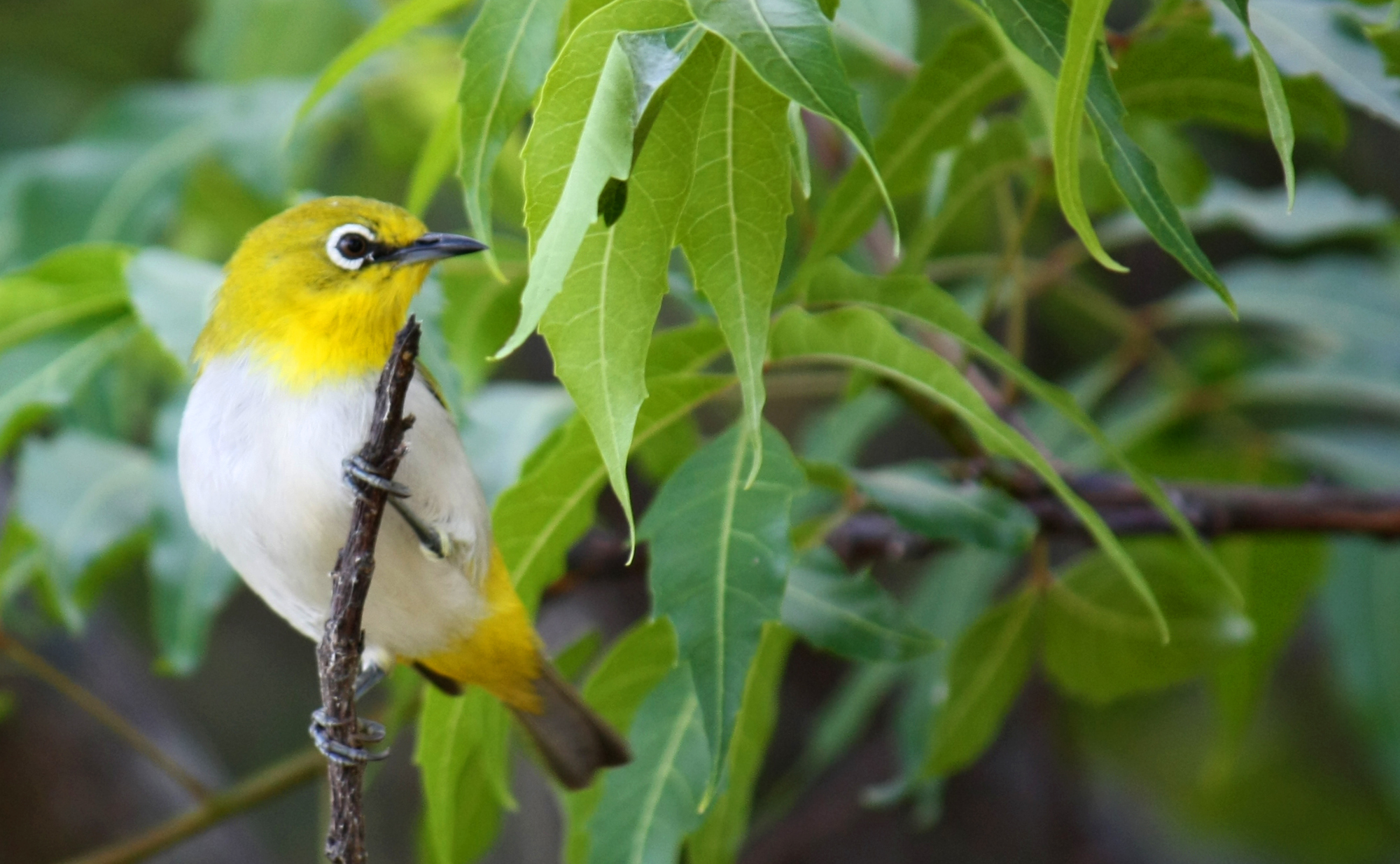
Indian white-eye

Order: Passeriformes Family: Zosteropidae

The white-eyes are small and mostly undistinguished, their plumage above being generally some dull colour like greenish-olive, but some species have a white or bright yellow throat, breast or lower parts, and several have buff flanks. As their name suggests, many species have a white ring around each eye.

- Indian white-eye, Zosterops palpebrosus

== Babblers and scimitar babblers ==
Order: Passeriformes Family: Timaliidae

The babblers, or timaliids, are somewhat diverse in size and colouration, but are characterised by soft fluffy plumage.

- Tawny-bellied babbler, Dumetia hyperythra
- Pin-striped tit-babbler, Mixornis gularis
- Buff-chested babbler, Cyanoderma ambiguum
- Indian scimitar babbler, Pomatorhinus horsfieldii

== Ground babblers ==
Order: Passeriformes Family: Pellorneidae

These small to medium-sized songbirds have soft fluffy plumage but are otherwise rather diverse. Members of the genus Illadopsis are found in forests, but some other genera are birds of scrublands.

- Puff-throated babbler, Pellorneum ruficeps

== Alcippe fulvettas ==
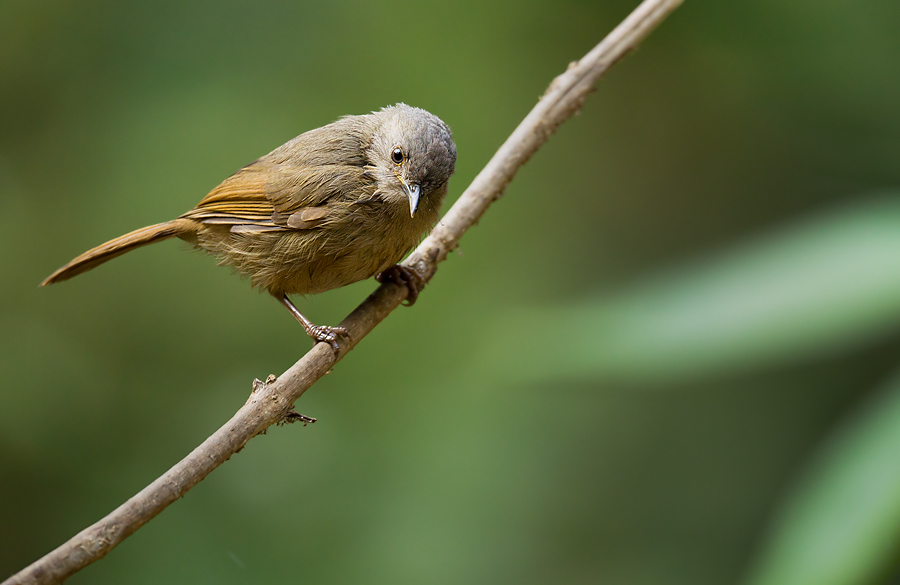
Brown-cheeked fulvetta or Quaker babbler

Order: Passeriformes Family: Alcippeidae

The genus once included many other fulvettas and was previously placed in families Pellorneidae or Timaliidae.

- Brown-cheeked fulvetta, Alcippe poioicephala

== Laughingthrushes and allies ==
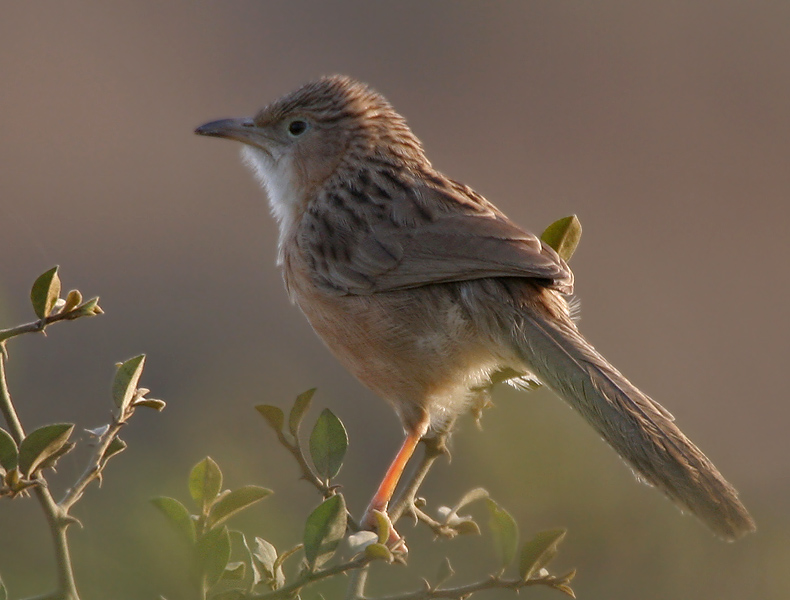
Common babbler

Order: Passeriformes Family: Leiothrichidae

The members of this family are diverse in size and colouration, though those of genus Turdoides tend to be brown or greyish. The family is found in Africa, India, and southeast Asia.

- Large grey babbler, Argya malcolmi
- Jungle babbler, Argya striata
- Yellow-billed babbler, Argya affinis
- Common babbler, Argya caudata

== Nuthatches ==
Order: Passeriformes Family: Sittidae

Nuthatches are small woodland birds. They have the unusual ability to climb down trees head first, unlike other birds which can only go upwards. Nuthatches have big heads, short tails and powerful bills and feet.

- Velvet-fronted nuthatch, Sitta frontalis
- Indian nuthatch, Sitta castanea

== Treecreepers ==
Order: Passeriformes Family: Certhiidae

Treecreepers are small woodland birds, brown above and white below. They have thin pointed down-curved bills, which they use to extricate insects from bark. They have stiff tail feathers, like woodpeckers, which they use to support themselves on vertical trees.

- Indian spotted creeper, Salpornis spilonota

== Starlings and rhabdornis ==
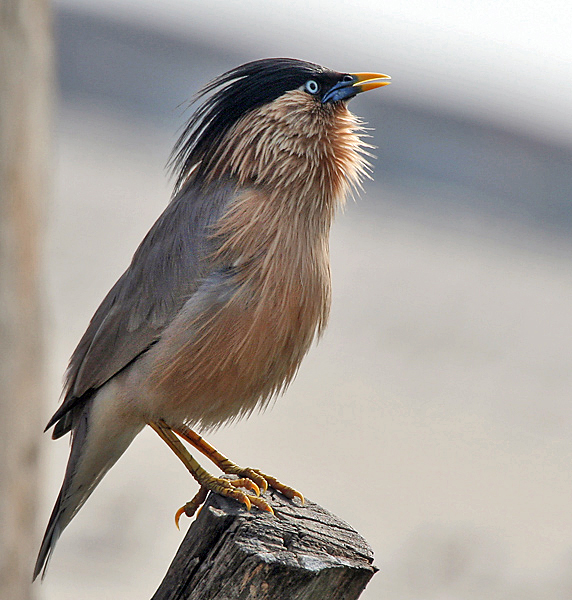
Brahminy starling

Order: Passeriformes Family: Sturnidae

Starlings are small to medium-sized passerine birds. Their flight is strong and direct and they are very gregarious. Their preferred habitat is fairly open country. They eat insects and fruit. Plumage is typically dark with a metallic sheen.

- Common hill myna, Gracula religiosa
- Jungle myna, Acridotheres fuscus
- Bank myna, Acridotheres ginginianus
- Common myna, Acridotheres tristis
- Indian pied myna, Gracupica contra
- Chestnut-tailed starling, Sturnia malabarica
- Brahminy starling, Sturnia pagodarum
- Rosy starling, Pastor roseus
- Common starling, Sturnus vulgaris

== Thrushes and allies ==
Order: Passeriformes Family: Turdidae

The thrushes are a group of passerine birds that occur mainly in the Old World. They are plump, soft plumaged, small to medium-sized insectivores or sometimes omnivores, often feeding on the ground. Many have attractive songs.

- Orange-headed thrush, Geokichla citrina
- Tickell's thrush, Turdus unicolor
- Indian blackbird, Turdus simillimus

== Old World flycatchers ==
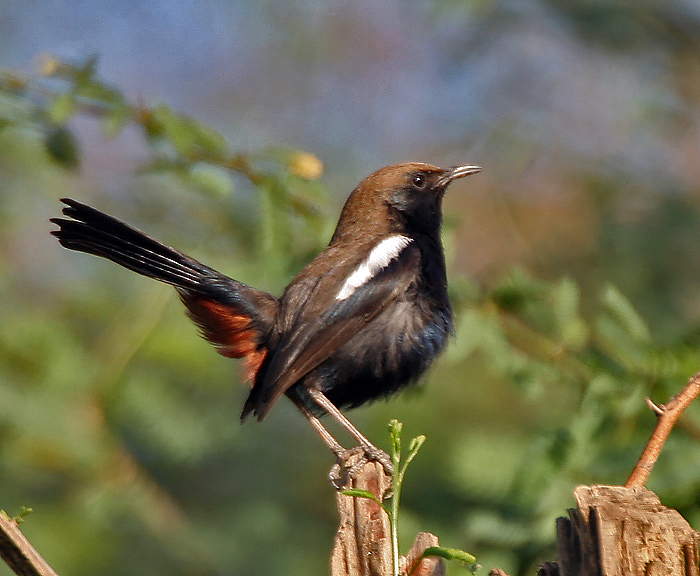
Indian robin

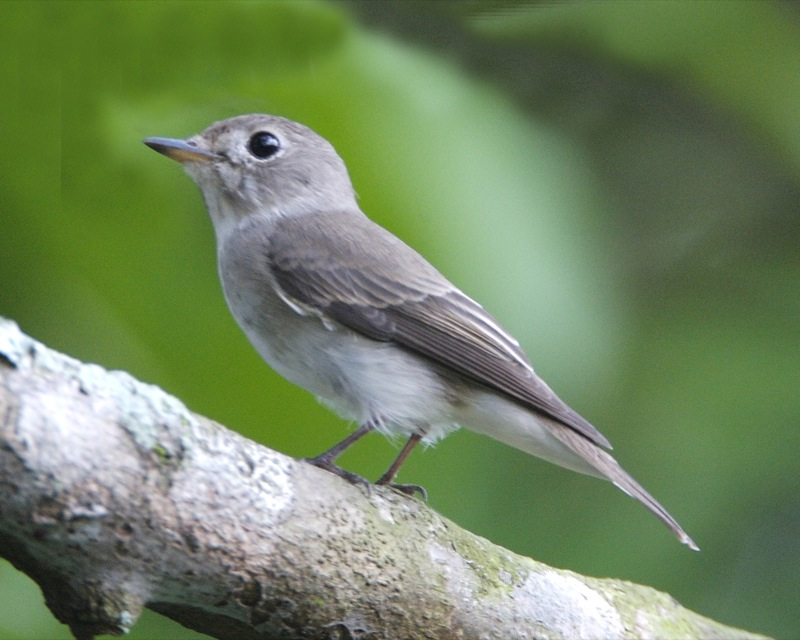
Asian brown flycatcher

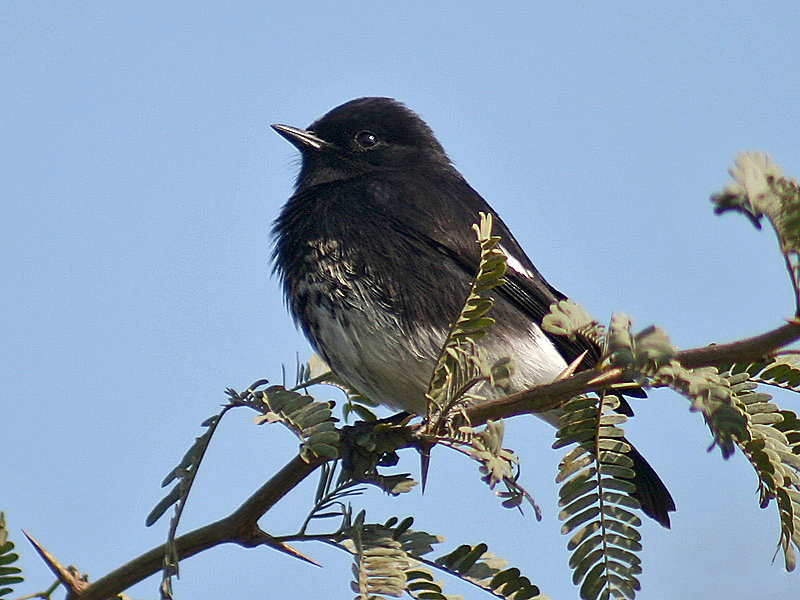
Pied bushchat

Order: Passeriformes Family: Muscicapidae

Old World flycatchers are a large group of small passerine birds native to the Old World. They are mainly small arboreal insectivores. The appearance of these birds is highly varied, but they mostly have weak songs and harsh calls.

- Indian robin, Copsychus fulicatus
- Oriental magpie-robin, Copsychus saularis
- White-rumped shama, Copsychus malabaricus
- Asian brown flycatcher, Muscicapa dauurica
- Brown-breasted flycatcher, Muscicapa muttui
- Hill blue flycatcher, Cyornis whitei
- Tickell's blue flycatcher, Cyornis tickelliae
- Blue-throated blue flycatcher, Cyornis rubeculoides
- Verditer flycatcher, Eumyias thalassinus
- Indian blue robin, Larvivora brunnea
- Bluethroat, Luscinia svecica
- Siberian rubythroat, Calliope calliope
- Malabar whistling thrush, Myophonus horsfieldii
- Ultramarine flycatcher, Ficedula superciliaris
- Little pied flycatcher, Ficedula westermanni
- Rusty-tailed flycatcher, Ficedula ruficauda
- Taiga flycatcher, Ficedula albicilla
- Red-breasted flycatcher, Ficedula parva
- Kashmir flycatcher, Ficedula subrubra
- Black redstart, Phoenicurus ochruros
- Blue rock thrush, Monticola solitarius
- Blue-capped rock thrush, Monticola cinclorhyncha
- Siberian stonechat, Saxicola maurus
- Pied bush chat, Saxicola caprata
- Grey bush chat, Saxicola ferreus
- Isabelline wheatear, Oenanthe isabellina
- Desert wheatear, Oenanthe deserti
- Brown rock chat, Oenanthe fusca

== Leafbirds ==
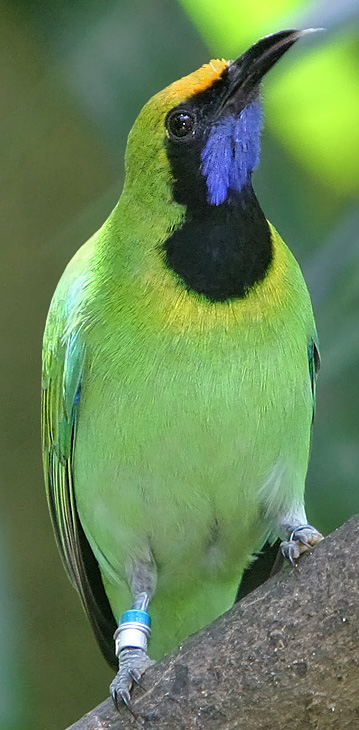
Golden-fronted leafbird

Order: Passeriformes Family: Chloropseidae

The leafbirds are small, bulbul-like birds. The males are brightly plumaged, usually in greens and yellows.

- Jerdon's leafbird, Chloropsis jerdoni
- Golden-fronted leafbird, Chloropsis aurifrons

== Flowerpeckers ==
Order: Passeriformes Family: Dicaeidae

The flowerpeckers are very small, stout, often brightly coloured birds, with short tails, short thick curved bills and tubular tongues.

- Thick-billed flowerpecker, Dicaeum agile
- Pale-billed flowerpecker, Dicaeum erythrorhynchos

== Sunbirds ==
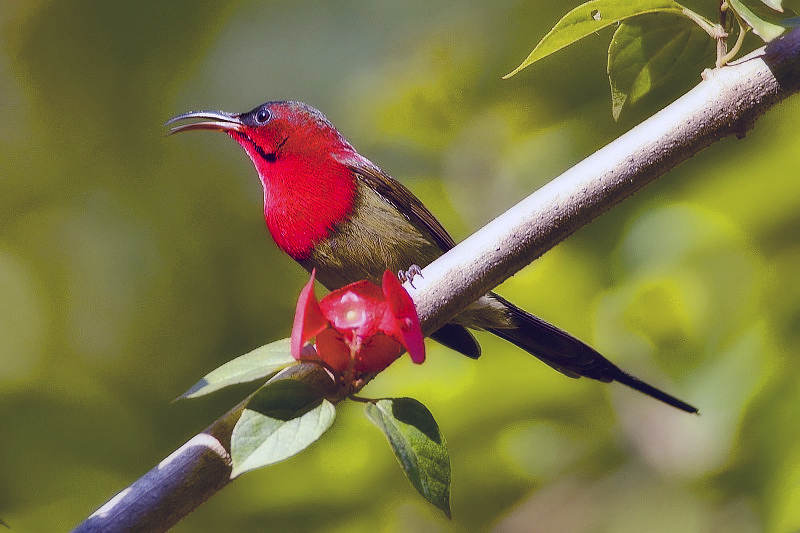
Crimson sunbird

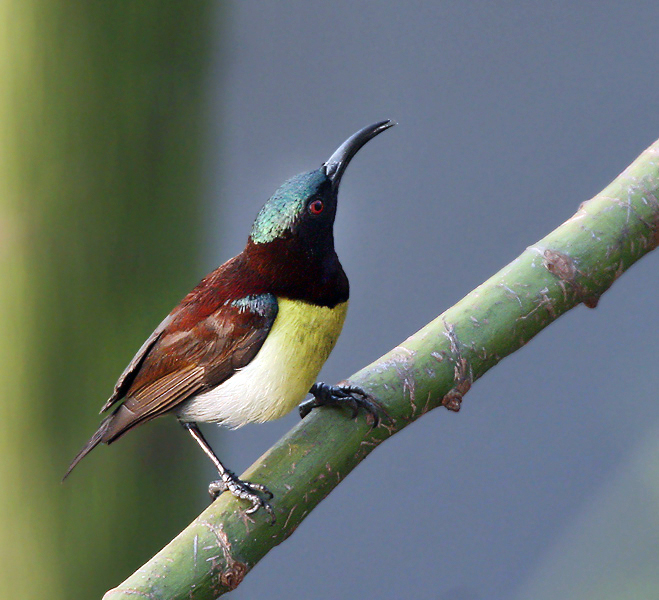
Purple-rumped sunbird

Order: Passeriformes Family: Nectariniidae

The sunbirds and spiderhunters are very small passerine birds which feed largely on nectar, although they will also take insects, especially when feeding young. Flight is fast and direct on their short wings. Most species can take nectar by hovering like a hummingbird, but usually perch to feed.

- Purple-rumped sunbird, Leptocoma zeylonica
- Purple sunbird, Cinnyris asiaticus
- Loten's sunbird, Cinnyris lotenius
- Crimson sunbird, Aethopyga siparaja
- Little spiderhunter, Arachnothera longirostra

== Old World sparrows and snowfinches ==
Order: Passeriformes Family: Passeridae

Sparrows are small passerine birds. In general, sparrows tend to be small, plump, brown or grey birds with short tails and short powerful beaks. Sparrows are seed eaters, but they also consume small insects.

- House sparrow, Passer domesticus
- Yellow-throated sparrow, Gymnoris xanthocollis

== Weavers and widowbirds ==
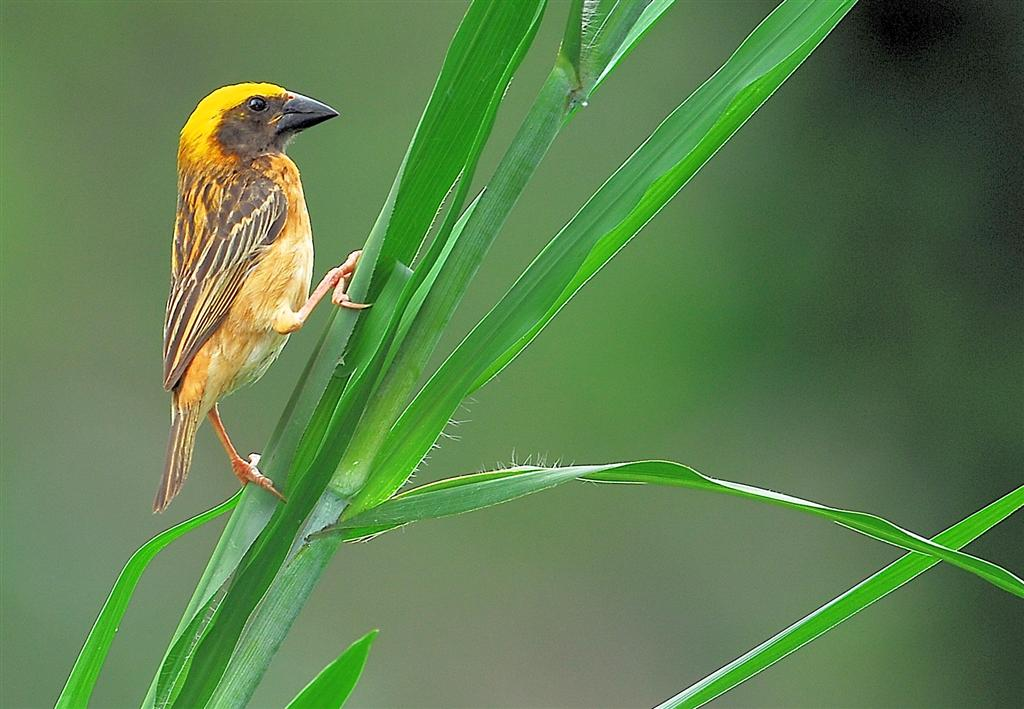
Baya weaver

Order: Passeriformes Family: Ploceidae

The weavers are small passerine birds related to the finches. They are seed-eating birds with rounded conical bills. The males of many species are brightly coloured, usually in red or yellow and black, some species show variation in colour only in the breeding season.

- Black-breasted weaver, Ploceus benghalensis
- Streaked weaver, Ploceus manyar
- Baya weaver, Ploceus philippinus

== Waxbills, munias, and allies ==
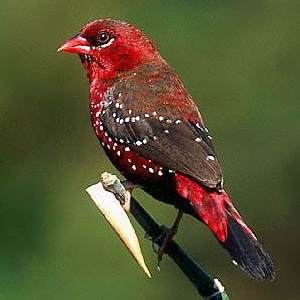
Red avadavat

Order: Passeriformes Family: Estrildidae

The estrildid finches are small passerine birds of the Old World tropics and Australasia. They are gregarious and often colonial seed eaters with short thick but pointed bills. They are all similar in structure and habits, but have wide variation in plumage colours and patterns.

- Indian silverbill, Euodice malabarica
- Scaly-breasted munia, Lonchura punctulata
- Black-throated munia, Lonchura kelaarti
- White-rumped munia, Lonchura striata
- Tricoloured munia, Lonchura malacca
- Green avadavat, Green avadavat
- Red avadavat, Amandava amandava

== Wagtails and pipits ==
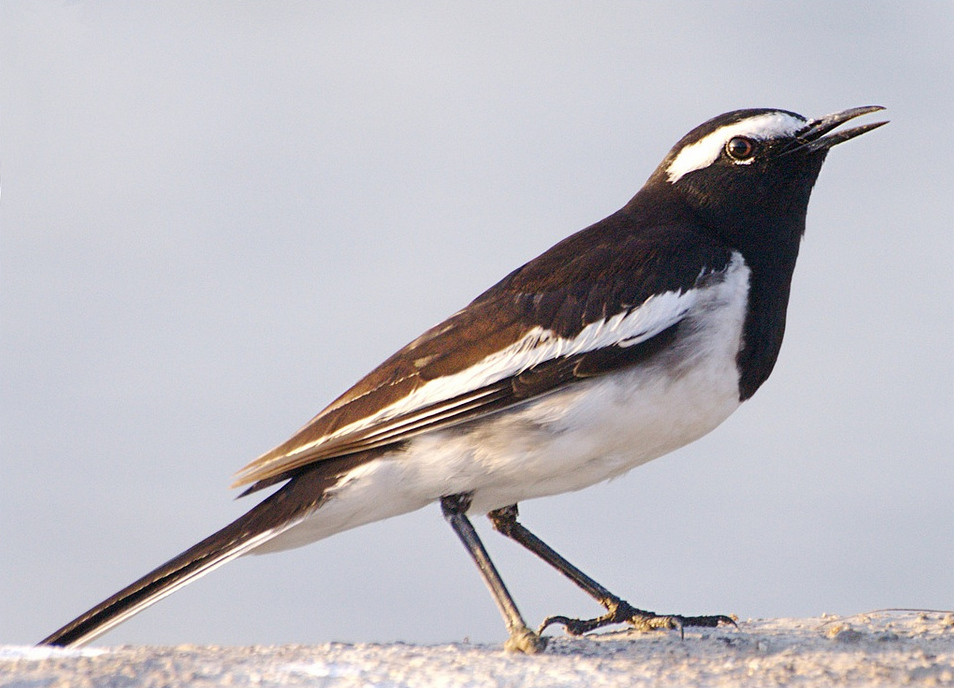
White-browed wagtail

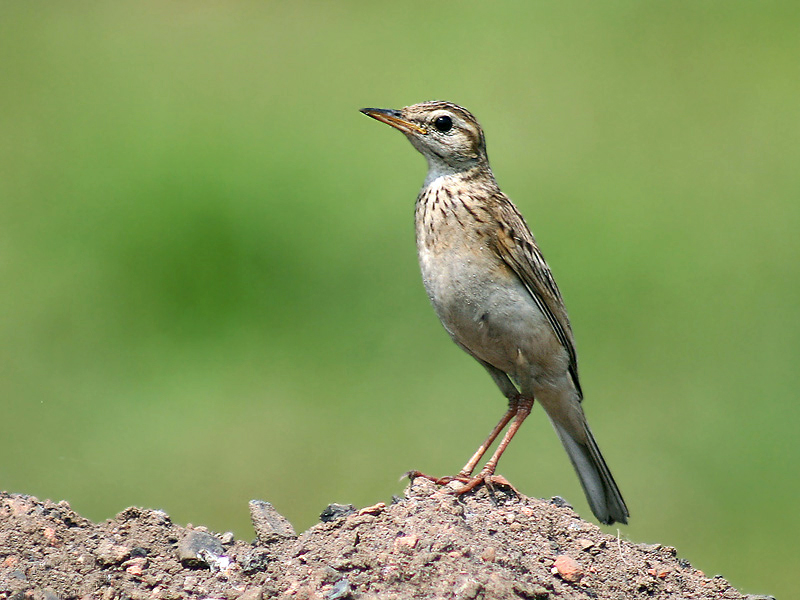
Paddyfield pipit

Order: Passeriformes Family: Motacillidae

Motacillidae is a family of small passerine birds with medium to long tails. They include the wagtails, longclaws and pipits. They are slender, ground feeding insectivores of open country.

- Forest wagtail, Dendronanthus indicus
- Western yellow wagtail, Motacilla flava
- Eastern yellow wagtail, Motacilla tschutschensis (A)
- Citrine wagtail, Motacilla citreola
- Grey wagtail, Motacilla cinerea
- White wagtail, Motacilla alba
- White-browed wagtail, Motacilla maderaspatensis
- Richard's pipit, Anthus richardi
- Paddyfield pipit, Anthus rufulus
- Blyth's pipit, Anthus godlewskii
- Tawny pipit, Anthus campestris
- Long-billed pipit, Anthus similis
- Tree pipit, Anthus trivialis
- Olive-backed pipit, Anthus hodgsoni
- Red-throated pipit, Anthus cervinus

== Finches and euphonias ==
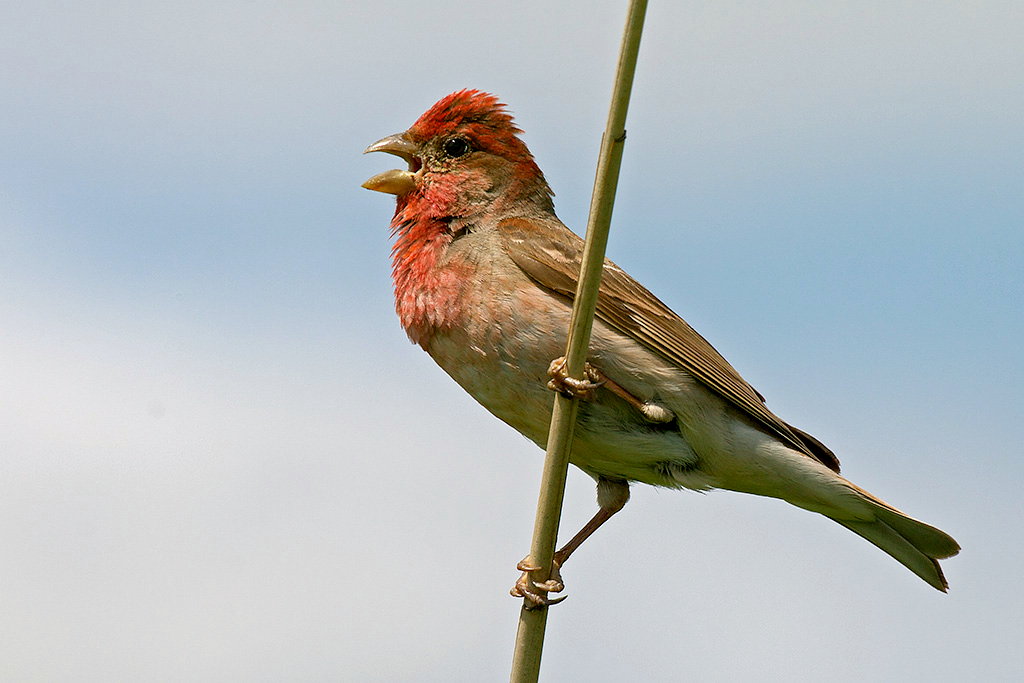
Common rosefinch

Order: Passeriformes Family: Fringillidae

Finches are seed-eating passerine birds, that are small to moderately large and have a strong beak, usually conical and in some species very large. All have twelve tail feathers and nine primaries. These birds have a bouncing flight with alternating bouts of flapping and gliding on closed wings, and most sing well.

- Common rosefinch, Carpodacus erythrinus

== Buntings ==
Order: Passeriformes Family: Emberizidae

The emberizids are a large family of passerine birds. They are seed-eating birds with distinctively shaped bills. In Europe, most species are called buntings. In North America, most of the species in this family are known as sparrows, but these birds are not closely related to the Old World sparrows which are in the family Passeridae. Many emberizid species have distinctive head patterns.

- Crested bunting, Emberiza lathami
- Grey-necked bunting, Emberiza buchanani
- Black-headed bunting, Emberiza melanocephala
- Red-headed bunting, Emberiza bruniceps

== See also ==
- Lists of birds by region
