= List of birds of Bengaluru =

The following is a list of birds found in and around Bengaluru in Karnataka, India. The Nandi Hills, Bannerghatta forest ranges and the Kaveri valley/Sangam area are included in addition to the Bengaluru city limits roughly extending 40 kilometres around the city centre (General Post Office). The area has been studied from early times due to its climate and accessibility during the Colonial period. This list also includes annotations. This list is largely based on an annotated checklist published in 1994. The family placement and sequence of families is based on the IOC world bird list (version 2.9).

Schematic map of birding areas in and around Bengaluru

Outline of routes to locations around Bengaluru

== Galliformes ==
=== Family: Phasianidae ===
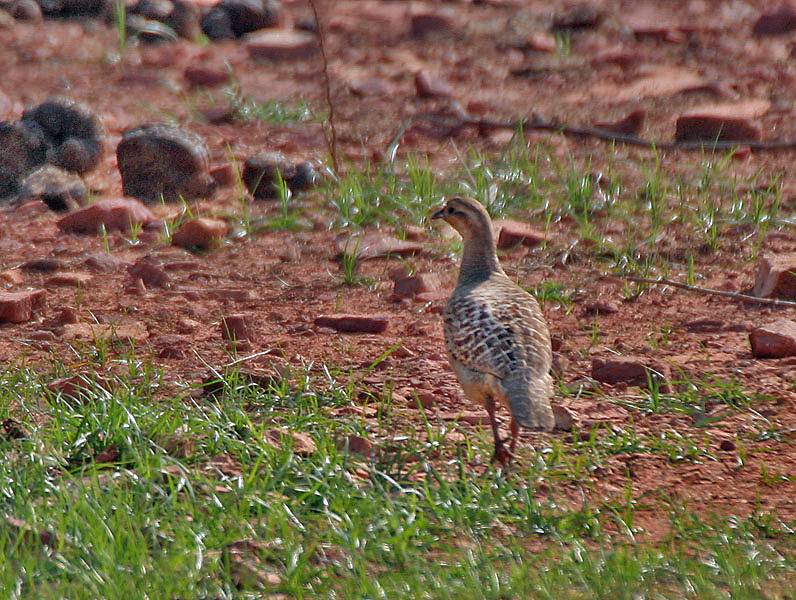
Grey francolin or grey partridge

- Grey francolin, Francolinus pondicerianus (breeding resident on outskirts)
- Common quail, Coturnix coturnix (rare, not seen since 2013)
- Rain quail, Coturnix coromandelica (rare, still common at Hesaraghatta and Maidenahalli areas)
- Jungle bush quail, Perdicula asiatica (breeding resident on outskirts)
- Rock bush quail, Perdicula argoondah (common at Maidenahalli region)
- Painted bush quail, Perdicula erythrorhyncha (rare, no recent records from Bengaluru)
- Red spurfowl, Galloperdix spadicea (rare)
- Painted spurfowl, Galloperdix lunulata (rare)
- Grey junglefowl, Gallus sonneratii (breeding resident)
- Indian peafowl, Pavo cristatus (breeding resident)

== Anseriformes ==
=== Family: Anatidae ===
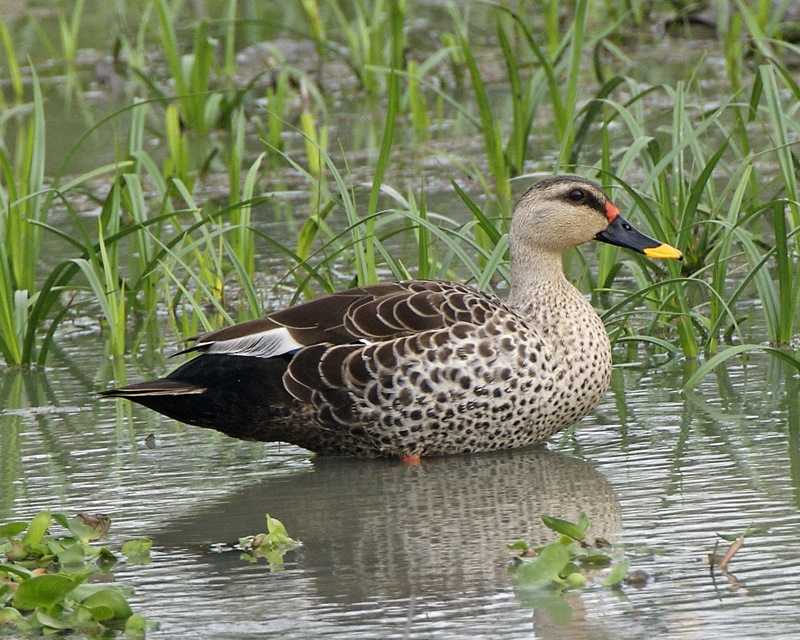
Indian spot-billed duck

- Fulvous whistling duck, Dendrocygna bicolor (vagrant, mostly from old records. However, new sightings have surfaced)
- Lesser whistling duck, Dendrocygna javanica
- Greylag goose, Anser anser
- Bar-headed goose, Anser indicus
- Ruddy shelduck, Tadorna ferruginea (historic)
- Knob-billed duck, Sarkidiornis melanotos (rare)
- Cotton pygmy goose, Nettapus coromandelianus
- Gadwall, Mareca strepera
- Eurasian wigeon, Mareca penelope
- Indian spot-billed duck, Anas poecilorhyncha
- Northern shoveler, Spatula clypeata
- Northern pintail, Anas acuta
- Garganey, Spatula querquedula
- Common teal, Anas crecca
- Common pochard, Aythya ferina
- Ferruginous duck, Aythya nyroca (unconfirmed record from Hesaraghatta, possibly in error)

== Podicipediformes ==
=== Family: Podicipedidae ===
- Little grebe, Tachybaptus ruficollis

== Phoenicopteriformes ==
=== Family: Phoenicopteridae ===
- Greater flamingo, Phoenicopterus roseus (vagrant. A flock of about 6 individuals recorded at Hoskote lake in September 2019)
- Lesser flamingo, Phoenicopterus minor (vagrant, historic)

== Ciconiiformes ==
=== Family: Ciconiidae ===
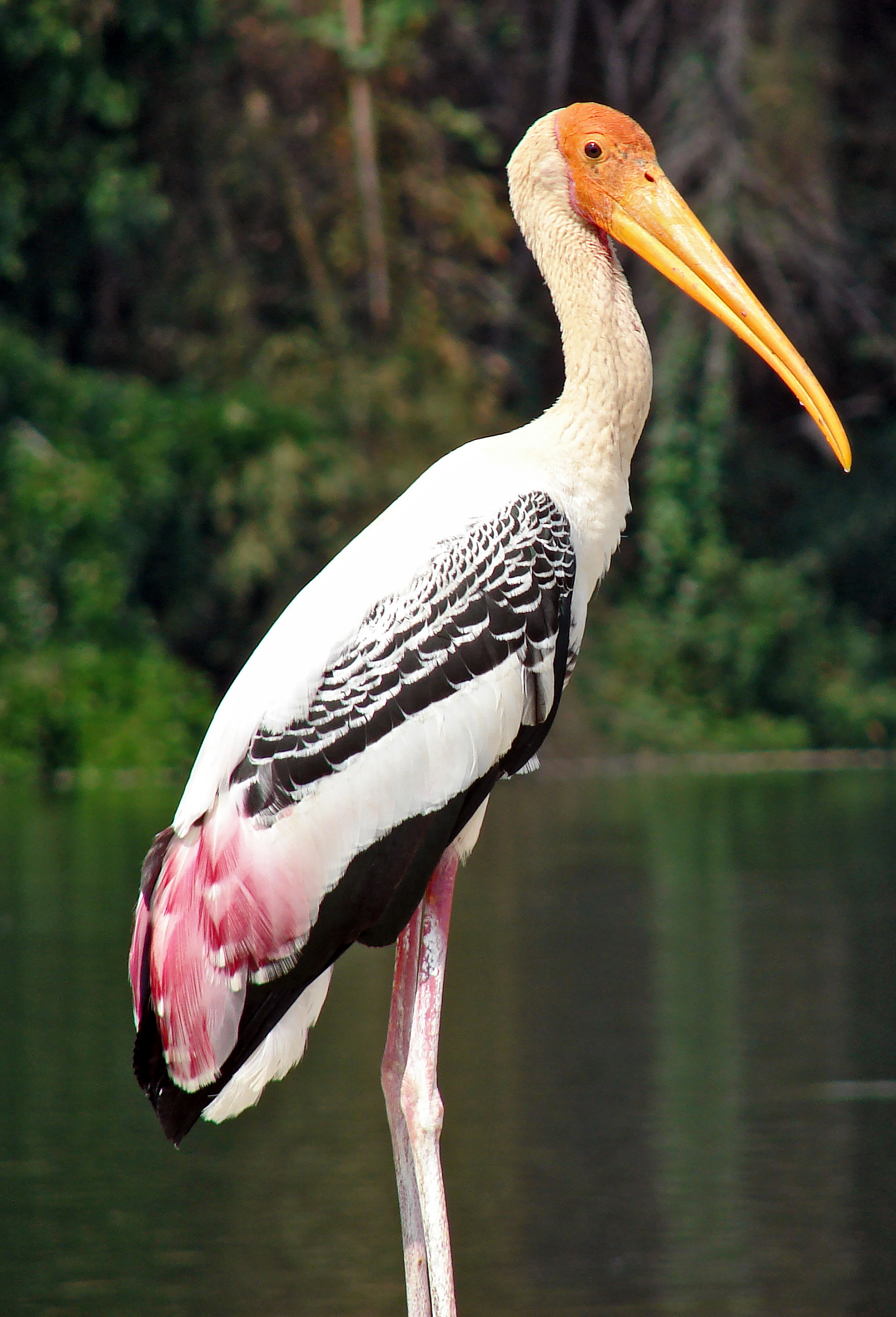
Painted stork

- Painted stork, Mycteria leucocephala
- Asian openbill, Anastomus oscitans
- Asian woolly-necked stork, Ciconia episcopus
- White stork, Ciconia ciconia (rare, no recent records in the area for over 6–7 years)
- Black stork, Ciconia nigra (winter visitor)
- Black-necked stork, Ephippiorhynchus asiaticus (could possibly be in error)
- Lesser adjutant, Leptoptilos javanicus (records north and south of Bengaluru, in Mysore and Chikkballapur)

== Pelecaniformes ==
=== Family: Threskiornithidae ===
- Glossy ibis, Plegadis falcinellus
- Black-headed ibis, Threskiornis melanocephalus
- Red-naped ibis, Pseudibis papillosa
- Eurasian spoonbill, Platalea leucorodia

=== Family: Ardeidae ===
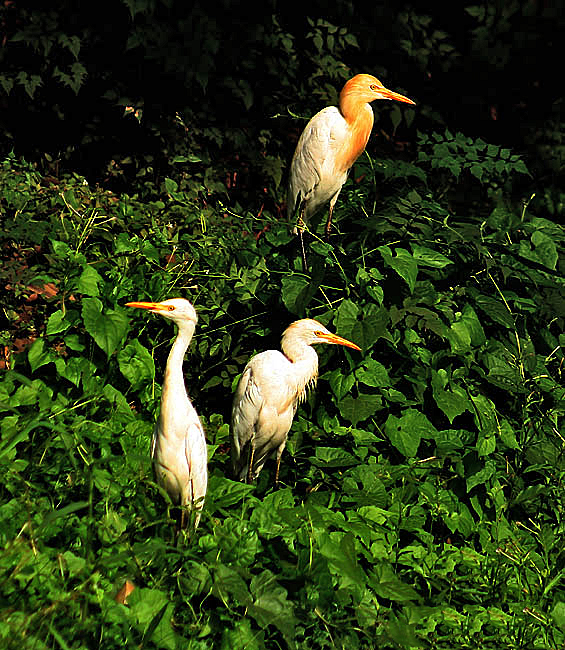
Cattle egrets

- Little egret, Egretta garzetta
- Western reef egret, Egretta gularis (rare)
- Grey heron, Ardea cinerea
- Purple heron, Ardea purpurea
- Eastern great egret, Ardea modesta
- Intermediate egret, Mesophoyx intermedia
- Cattle egret, Bubulcus ibis
- Indian pond heron, Ardeola grayii
- Striated heron, Butorides striatus
- Black-crowned night heron, Nycticorax nycticorax
- Little bittern, Ixobrychus minutus (historical, possibly in error)
- Yellow bittern, Ixobrychus sinensis
- Cinnamon bittern, Ixobrychus cinnamomeus
- Black bittern, Ixobrychus flavicollis (uncommon resident)
- Great bittern, Botaurus stellaris (historic)

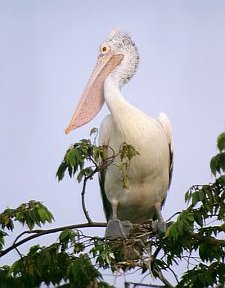
Spot-billed pelican

=== Family: Pelecanidae ===
- Spot-billed pelican, Pelecanus philippensis
- Great white pelican, Pelecanus onocrotalus (vagrant? – first noted in 2008 – one in 2017 at Ranganathittu)

== Suliformes ==
=== Family: Phalacrocoracidae ===
- Little cormorant, Microcarbo niger
- Indian cormorant, Phalacrocorax fuscicollis
- Great cormorant, Phalacrocorax carbo

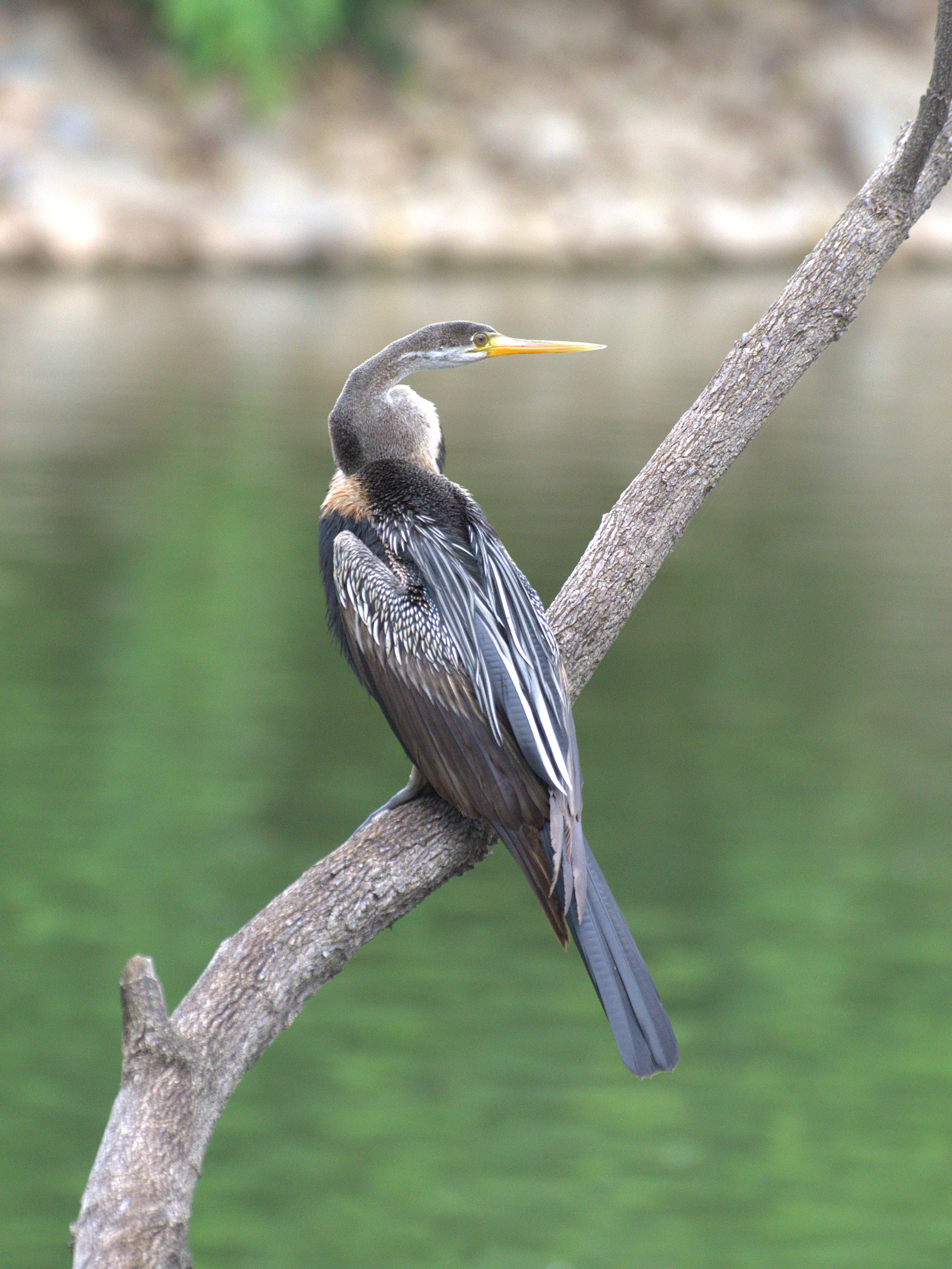
Oriental darter

=== Family: Anhingidae ===
- Oriental darter, Anhinga melanogaster

== Accipitriformes ==
=== Family Pandionidae ===
- Osprey, Pandion haliaetus (historic, few recent sightings)

=== Family: Accipitridae ===
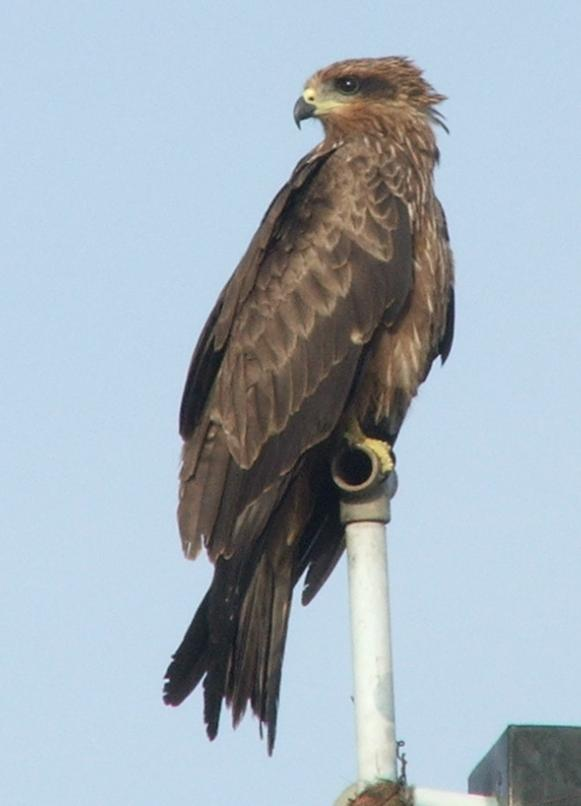
Black kite, a scavenger

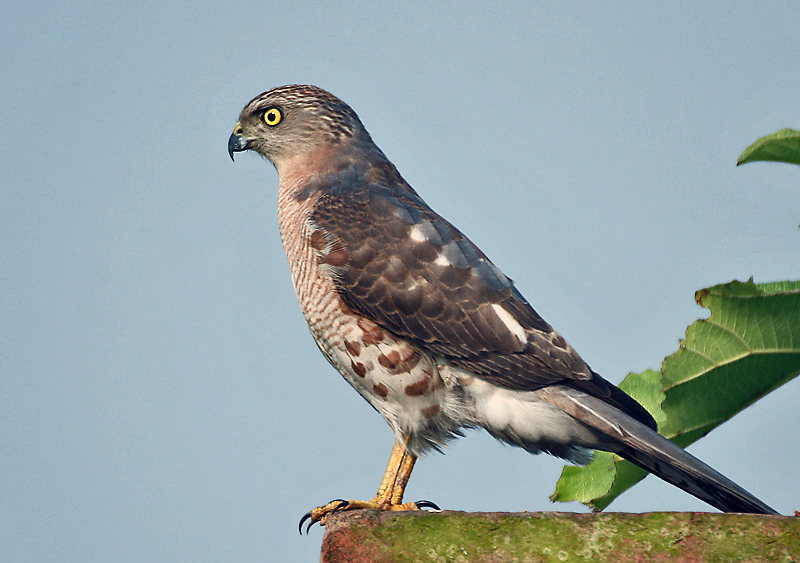
Shikra

- Black baza, Aviceda leuphotes (rare, possibly passage migrant, one historic record from Bengaluru Golf Club, 1980s and one record from Nandi Hills. Newer records could shed light on this species habits in the region.)
- Crested honey buzzard, Pernis ptilorhyncus
- European honey buzzard, Pernis apivorus (vagrant)
- Black-winged kite, Elanus caeruleus
- Black kite, Milvus migrans
- Brahminy kite, Haliastur indus
- Lesser fish eagle, Ichthyophaga humilis (Kaveri valley)
- Grey-headed fish eagle, Ichthyophaga ichthyaetus (records only from Cauvery WLS area)
- Egyptian vulture, Neophron percnopterus
- White-rumped vulture, Gyps bengalensis (locally extinct in Bengaluru, common in Nagarahole NP)
- Indian vulture, Gyps indicus (locally extinct in Bengaluru, populations however slowly recovering)
- Himalayan vulture, Gyps himalayensis (rare vagrant – juveniles mainly)
- Red-headed vulture, Sarcogyps calvus (historic, some stragglers still arrive in the Kaveri Valley and the species is relatively common in the Bandipur-Nagarahole region.)
- Short-toed snake eagle, Circaetus gallicus
- Crested serpent eagle, Spilornis cheela
- Marsh harrier, Circus aeruginosus
- Hen harrier, Circus cyaneus
- Pallid harrier, Circus macrourus
- Pied harrier, Circus melanoleucos
- Montagu's harrier, Circus pygargus
- Crested goshawk, Accipiter trivirgatus (only from the Cauvery WLS south, although stragglers in Bengaluru not unlikely)
- Shikra, Accipiter badius
- Eurasian sparrowhawk, Accipiter nisus
- Eurasian goshawk, Accipiter gentilis
- Besra, Accipiter virgatus (rare in Bannerghatta, gets common further south)
- White-eyed buzzard, Butastur teesa
- Black eagle, Ictinaetus malaiensis
- Indian spotted eagle, Clanga hastata (older records of lesser spotted eagle, Aquila pomarina may be attributed to this species)
- Greater spotted eagle, Clanga clanga
- Tawny eagle, Aquila rapax
- Steppe eagle, Aquila nipalensis
- Eastern imperial eagle, Aquila heliaca (historic, possibly in error. Most recent records from Northern Karnataka)
- Bonelli's eagle, Aquila fasciata
- Booted eagle, Hieraaetus pennatus
- Rufous-bellied hawk-eagle, Lophotriorchis kienerii (rare) (a photographic record of a juvenile from the Kaveri valley area, one from Bannerghatta)
- Changeable hawk-eagle, Nisaetus cirrhatus
- Common buzzard, Buteo buteo (records of birds in Bengaluru and outskirts – Arkavathi Layout and other areas)
- Long-legged buzzard, Buteo rufinus (recent records from north of Bengaluru)

== Falconiformes ==
=== Family: Falconidae ===
- Common kestrel, Falco tinnunculus
- Lesser kestrel, Falco naumanni (rare, records from Hesaraghatta and Chikkballapur areas)
- Red-necked falcon, Falco chicquera
- Laggar falcon, Falco jugger
- Eurasian hobby, Falco subbuteo (rare)
- Amur falcon, Falco amurensis (rare, passage)
- Peregrine falcon, Falco peregrinus
  - Shaheen falcon, Falco peregrinus peregrinator (resident)
  - Peregrine falcon, Falco peregrinus calidus (winter migrant)

== Otidiformes ==
=== Family: Otididae ===
- Great Indian bustard, Ardeotis nigriceps (historic, known from Northeastern Karnataka-the nearest new records)
- Lesser florican, Sypheotides indicus (mostly old records, one in 2011-12 from Hesaraghatta region)

== Gruiformes ==
=== Family: Rallidae ===
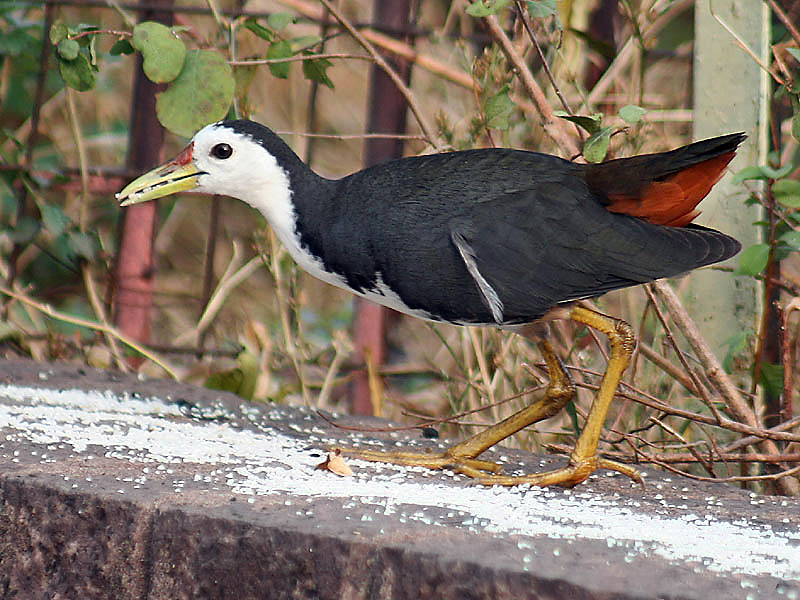
White-breasted waterhen

- White-breasted waterhen, Amaurornis phoenicurus
- Brown crake, Zapornia akool
- Slaty-legged crake, Rallina eurizonoides (rare, records from IISc campus)
- Spotted crake, Porzana porzana (one recent record from Anekal region, close to Tamil Nadu border)
- Baillon's crake, Zapornia pusilla
- Ruddy-breasted crake, Zapornia fusca
- Slaty-breasted rail, Lewinia striata
- Watercock, Gallicrex cinerea (historic, still exist in small pockets)
- Grey-headed swamphen, Porphyrio poliocephalus
- Common moorhen, Gallinula chloropus
- Eurasian coot, Fulica atra

=== Family: Gruidae ===
- Demoiselle crane, Anthropoides virgo (historic, once recorded at Hulimangala in 2015)

== Charadriiformes ==
=== Family: Turnicidae ===
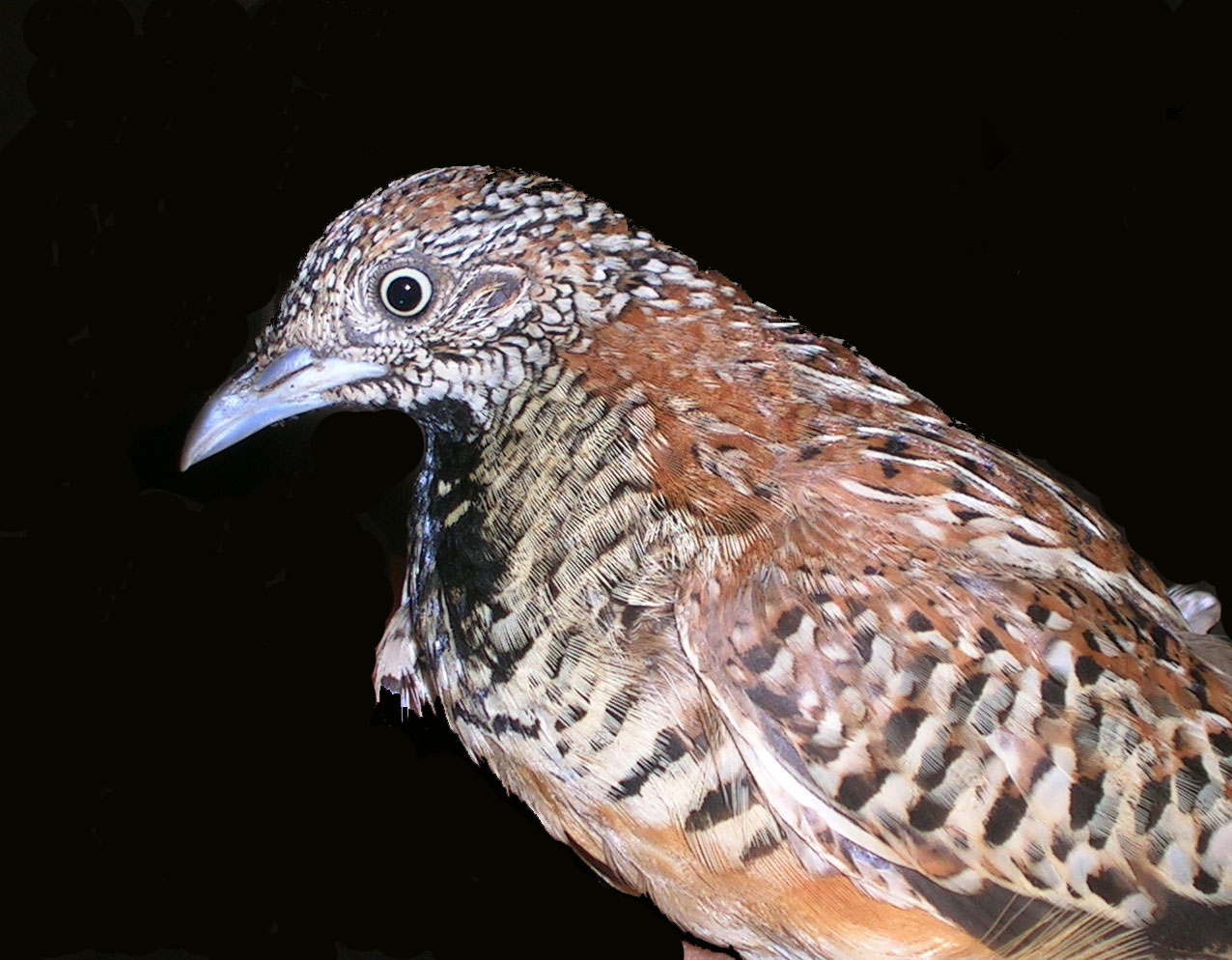
Barred buttonquail

- Yellow-legged buttonquail, Turnix tanki (rare, only records have been from the Indian Institute of Science campus)
- Barred buttonquail, Turnix suscitator (uncommon, mostly seen in the Bannerghatta and Kanakapura scrub areas)

=== Family: Burhinidae ===
- Indian stone-curlew, Burhinus indicus (rare)
- Great stone-curlew, Esacus recurvirostris (rare)

=== Family Recurvirostridae ===
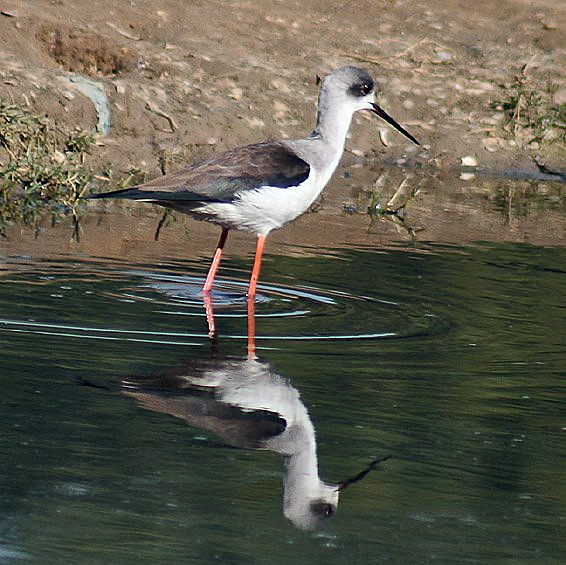
Black-winged stilt

- Black-winged stilt, Himantopus himantopus
- Pied avocet, Recurvirostra avosetta (historic, recent records from Sonnapura in Chikkballapura)

=== Family Charadriidae ===
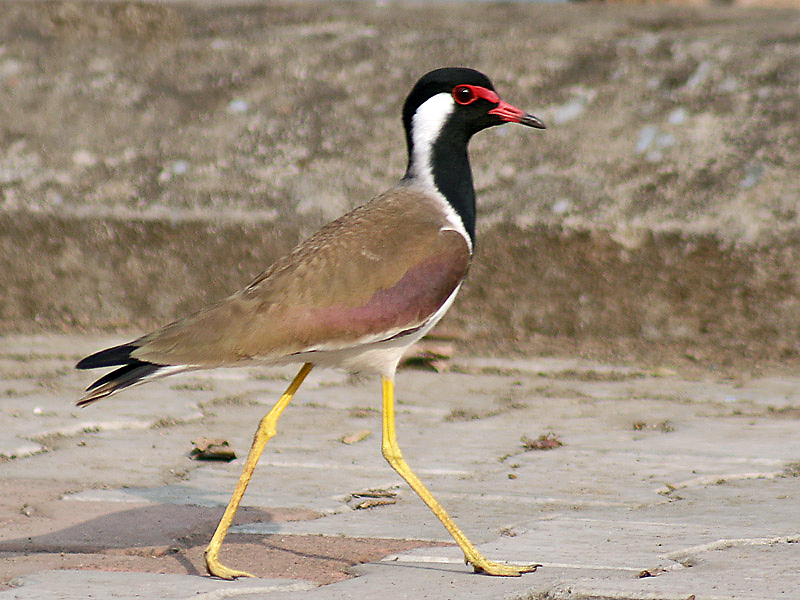
Red-wattled lapwing

- Pacific golden plover, Pluvialis fulva (rare)
- Grey plover, Pluvialis squatarola (rare)
- Common ringed plover, Charadrius hiaticula (rare, no recent records)
- Little ringed plover, Charadrius dubius (breeding resident)
- Kentish plover, Charadrius alexandrinus
- Yellow-wattled lapwing, Vanellus malabaricus (breeding resident, found only in open areas)
- Grey-headed lapwing, Vanellus cinereus (rare winter visitor)
- Red-wattled lapwing, Vanellus indicus (breeding resident)

=== Family: Rostratulidae ===
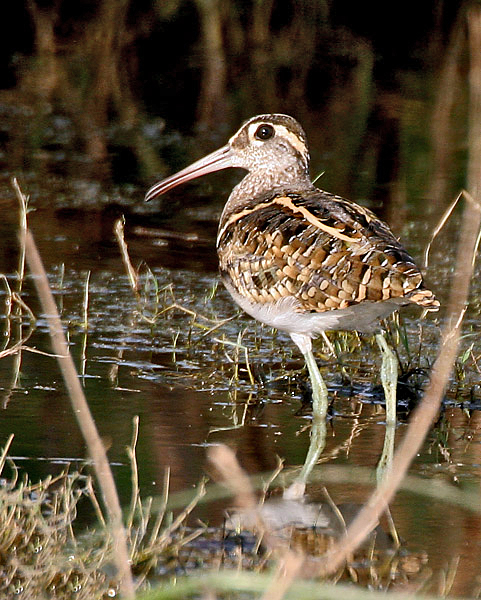
Greater painted snipe

- Greater painted snipe, Rostratula benghalensis

=== Family: Jacanidae ===
- Pheasant-tailed jacana, Hydrophasianus chirurgus
- Bronze-winged jacana, Metopidius indicus (common resident)

=== Family: Scolopacidae ===
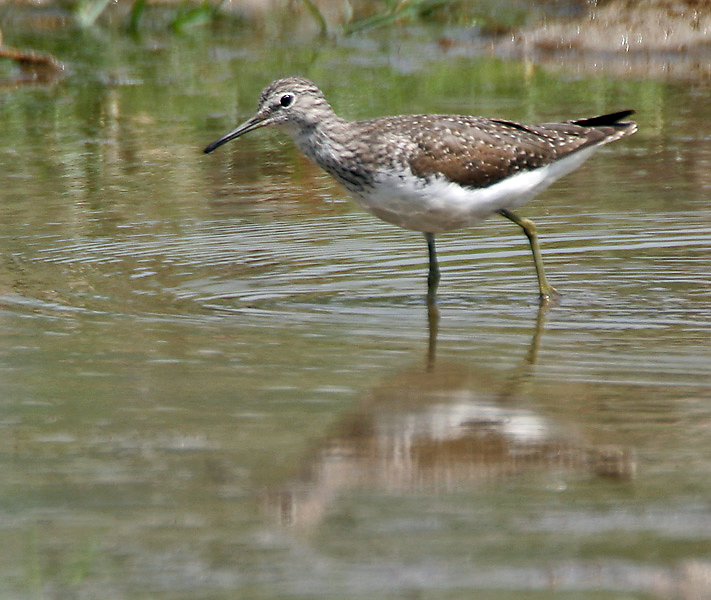
Green sandpiper, a winter migrant

- Eurasian woodcock, Scolopax rusticola (vagrant)
- Pintail snipe, Gallinago stenura
- Great snipe, Gallinago media (historic)
- Common snipe, Gallinago gallinago
- Wood snipe, Gallinago nemoricola (historic)
- Jack snipe, Lymnocryptes minimus (not many recent reports)
- Black-tailed godwit, Limosa limosa
- Eurasian curlew, Numenius arquata
- Eurasian whimbrel, Numenius phaeopus (rare passage migrant?)
- Spotted redshank, Tringa erythropus
- Common redshank, Tringa totanus
- Marsh sandpiper, Tringa stagnatilis
- Common greenshank, Tringa nebularia
- Green sandpiper, Tringa ochropus
- Wood sandpiper, Tringa glareola
- Terek sandpiper, Xenus cinereus
- Common sandpiper, Actitis hypoleucos
- Dunlin, Calidris alpina (recent record from Hesaraghatta)
- Curlew sandpiper, Calidris ferruginea
- Little stint, Calidris minuta
- Temminck's stint, Calidris temminckii
- Long-toed stint, Calidris subminuta
- Ruff, Philomachus pugnax
- Red-necked phalarope, Phalaropus lobatus (historic and rare passage migrant)

=== Family: Glareolidae ===
- Indian courser, Cursorius coromandelicus (Dr Robert B. Watson shot an Indian courser from a flock on 26 April 1952 and again saw two birds when he visited on 15 May 1952.)
- Small pratincole, Glareola lactea
- Oriental pratincole, Glareola maldivarum
- Collared pratincole, Glareola pratincola

=== Family: Laridae ===
- Brown-headed gull, Chroicocephalus brunnicephalus
- Black-headed gull, Chroicocephalus ridibundus
- Slender-billed gull, Chroicocephalus genei (rare – first record in November 2016 – 3 individuals in Madivala Lake, one recently spotted at Hesaraghatta)
- Heuglin's gull, Larus fuscus heuglini (telemetry shows one flew over Bengaluru)
- Gull-billed tern, Gelochelidon nilotica (rare)
- Caspian tern, Hydroprogne caspia (rare)
- River tern, Sterna aurantia
- Black-bellied tern, Sterna acuticauda (rare, recent records only from Talakad near Mysore)
- Little tern, Sternula albifrons (rare with few records near Bengaluru)
- Whiskered tern, Chlidonias hybrida
- White-winged tern, Chlidonias leucopterus (rare, few records from north region)

== Pterocliformes ==
=== Family: Pteroclidae ===
- Painted sandgrouse, Pterocles indicus (rare, only a few records in recent times)
- Chestnut-bellied sandgrouse, Pterocles exustus (historic, some new records from Maidenahalli)

== Columbiformes ==
=== Family: Columbidae ===
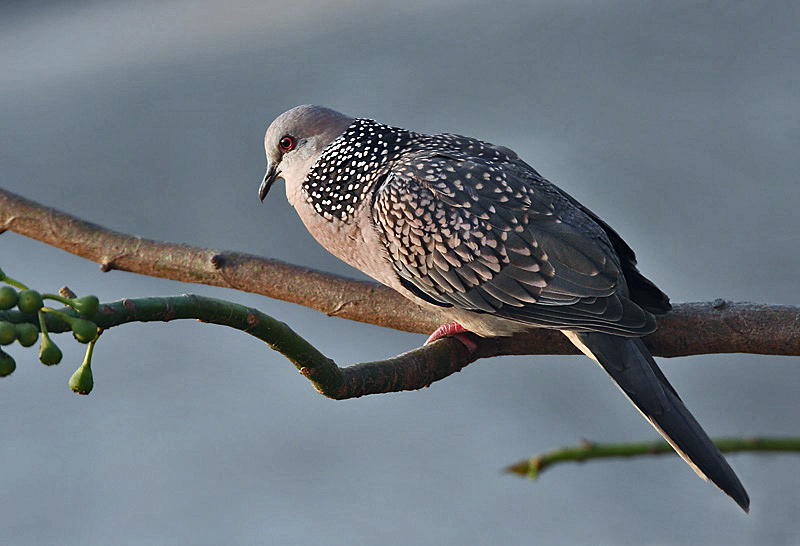
Spotted dove

- Rock dove, Columba livia
- Nilgiri wood pigeon, Columba elphinstonii (only in Nandi Hills – historic record from Bannerghatta National Park)
- Green imperial pigeon, Ducula aenea (only from Cauvery WLS; a recent record exists from Pearl Valley)
- Laughing dove, Spilopelia senegalensis
- Spotted dove, Spilopelia chinensis
- Oriental turtle dove, Streptopelia orientalis (rare)
- Red collared dove, Streptopelia tranquebarica (rare)
- Eurasian collared dove, Streptopelia decaocto
- Yellow-footed green pigeon, Treron phoenicoptera (rare)
- Orange-breasted green pigeon, Treron bicincta (rare) (a few records in 2006 and 2011 from Hesaraghatta and Indian Institute of Science, one more recently from B M Kaval Forest)
- Grey-fronted green pigeon, Treron affinis (rare, records only from Bannerghatta National Park)

== Psittaciformes ==
=== Family: Psittaculidae ===
- Alexandrine parakeet, Psittacula eupatria (rare)
- Rose-ringed parakeet, Psittacula krameri (breeding resident)
- Plum-headed parakeet, Psittacula cyanocephala (unclear pattern, but commoner in winter)
- Blue-winged parakeet, Psittacula columboides (historic, but recent records from near the Kanakapura and Thali forest areas. Most recent record from Bangalore University campus in 2021)
- Red-breasted parakeet, Psittacula alexandri (introduced escapees)
- Vernal hanging parrot, Loriculus vernalis (records in Bengaluru have been only from the Indian Institute of Science campus. Rather surprisingly, there have been increasing recent records in and near the Devarayanadurga Forest region.)

== Cuculiformes ==
=== Family: Cuculidae ===
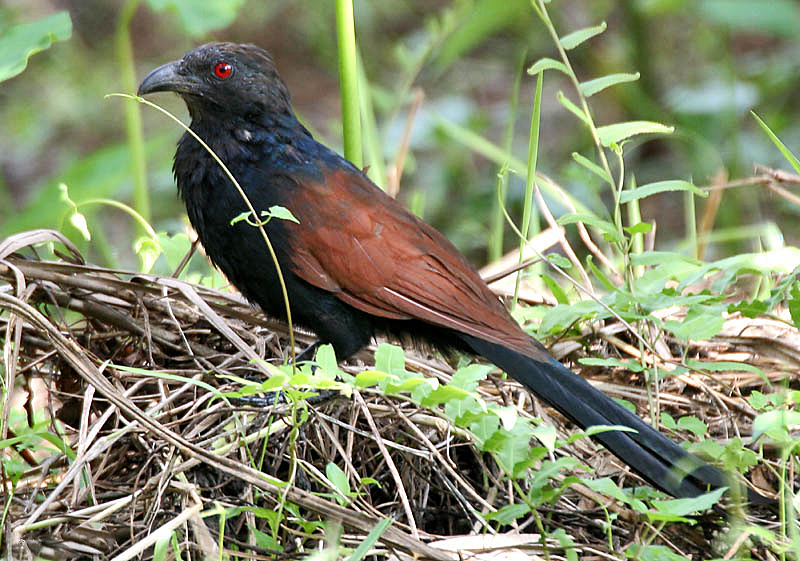
Greater coucal

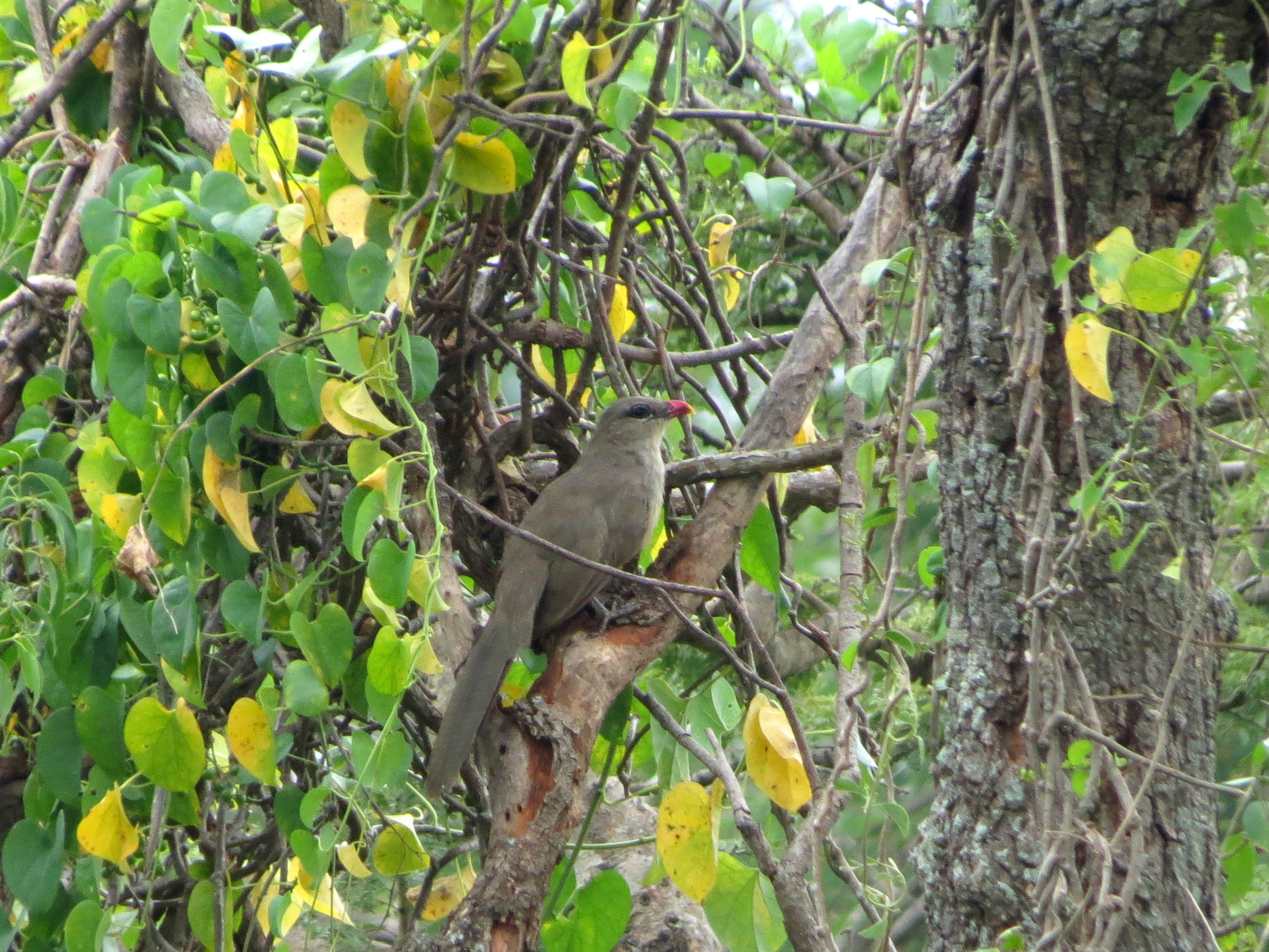
Sirkeer malkoha

- Pied cuckoo, Clamator jacobinus
- Chestnut-winged cuckoo, Clamator coromandus (rare, a few records from Bengaluru and adjoining regions)
- Large hawk-cuckoo, Hierococcyx sparverioides (one recent record from Valley School (B M Kaval). More common at the Bandipur and Nagarahole NPs)
- Common hawk-cuckoo, Hierococcyx varius
- Indian cuckoo, Cuculus micropterus (uncommon, becoming increasingly rare/elusive)
- Common cuckoo, Cuculus canorus (passage)
- Himalayan cuckoo, Cuculus saturatus (possibly in error)
- Lesser cuckoo, Cuculus poliocephalus (BngBirds in 2014 from Hesserghatta, passage)
- Banded bay cuckoo, Cacomantis sonneratii (rare)
- Grey-bellied cuckoo, Cacomantis passerinus
- Fork-tailed drongo-cuckoo, Surniculus dicruroides
- Asian koel, Eudynamys scolopacea
- Blue-faced malkoha, Phaenicophaeus viridirostris
- Sirkeer malkoha, Phaenicophaeus leschenaultii (rare, reported from Maidenahalli)
- Greater coucal, Centropus sinensis

== Strigiformes ==
=== Family: Tytonidae ===
- Eastern barn owl, Tyto javanica

=== Family: Strigidae ===
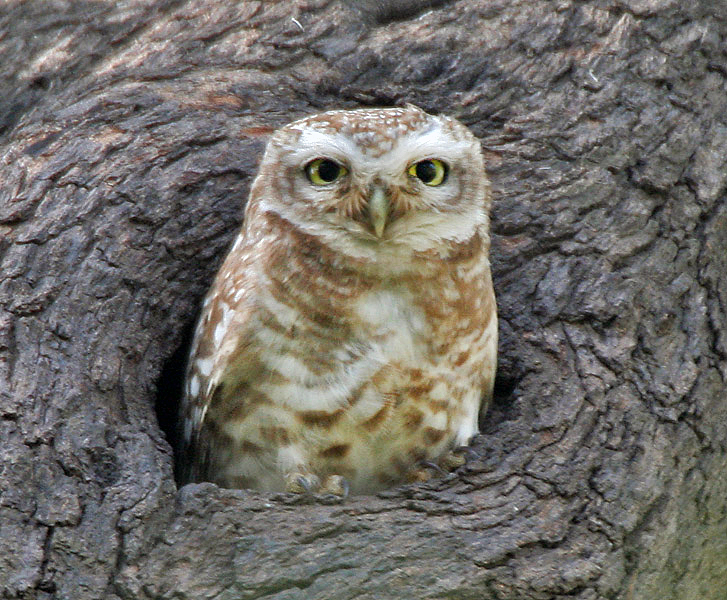
Spotted owlet

- Short-eared owl, Asio flammeus (rare, vagrant)
- Oriental scops owl, Otus sunia
- Indian scops owl, Otus bakkamoena
- Indian eagle-owl, Bubo bengalensis (found in rocky outcrops such as at the NICE expressway, declining fast from urbanisation)
- Spot-bellied eagle-owl, Bubo nipalensis (historic records from Kaveri valley. One juvenile was recorded by a camera trap at Bilikal Betta, Ramanagara district in 2015)
- Brown fish owl, Ketupa zeylonensis (records only from the Bannerghatta National Park in Bengaluru, not rare in Kaveri Valley)
- Mottled wood owl, Strix ocellata
- Brown wood owl, Strix leptogrammica (rare, records so far only from Bannerghatta area and GKVK campus)
- Jungle owlet, Glaucidium radiatum
- Spotted owlet, Athene brama
- Brown boobook, Ninox scutulata (rare, except in Kaveri Valley where the species is fairly common)

== Caprimulgiformes ==
=== Family: Caprimulgidae ===
- Jungle nightjar, Caprimulgus indicus
- Sykes's nightjar, Caprimulgus mahrattensis (historic)
- Jerdon's nightjar, Caprimulgus atripennis
- Indian nightjar, Caprimulgus asiaticus
- Savanna nightjar, Caprimulgus affinis
- Grey nightjar, Caprimulgus jotaka (specimen examined by S A Hussain)

== Apodiformes ==
=== Family: Hemiprocnidae ===
- Crested treeswift, Hemiprocne coronata

=== Family: Apodidae ===
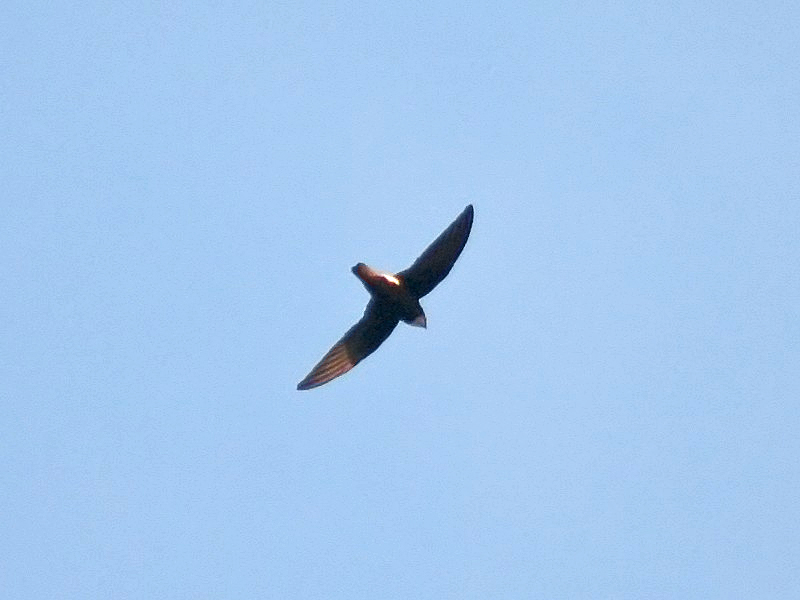
House swift

- Indian swiftlet, Collocalia unicolor (rare)
- White-rumped needletail, Zoonavena sylvatica (rare)
- Brown-backed needletail, Hirundapus giganteus (rare)
- Asian palm swift, Cypsiurus balasiensis
- Alpine swift, Tachymarptis melba
- Blyth's swift, Apus leuconyx (mainly Bandipur NP, records in Bengaluru only at JB Kaval forest)
- House swift, Apus affinis

== Coraciiformes ==
=== Family: Coraciidae ===
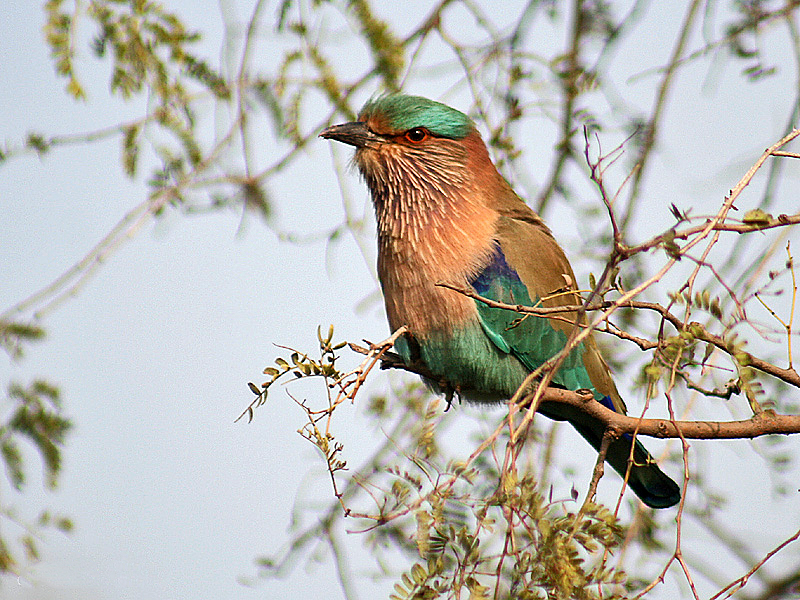
Indian roller, the state bird of Karnataka

- Indian roller, Coracias benghalensis
- European roller, Coracias garrulus (records from Hesaraghatta and Maidenahalli region, passage)

=== Family: Alcedinidae ===
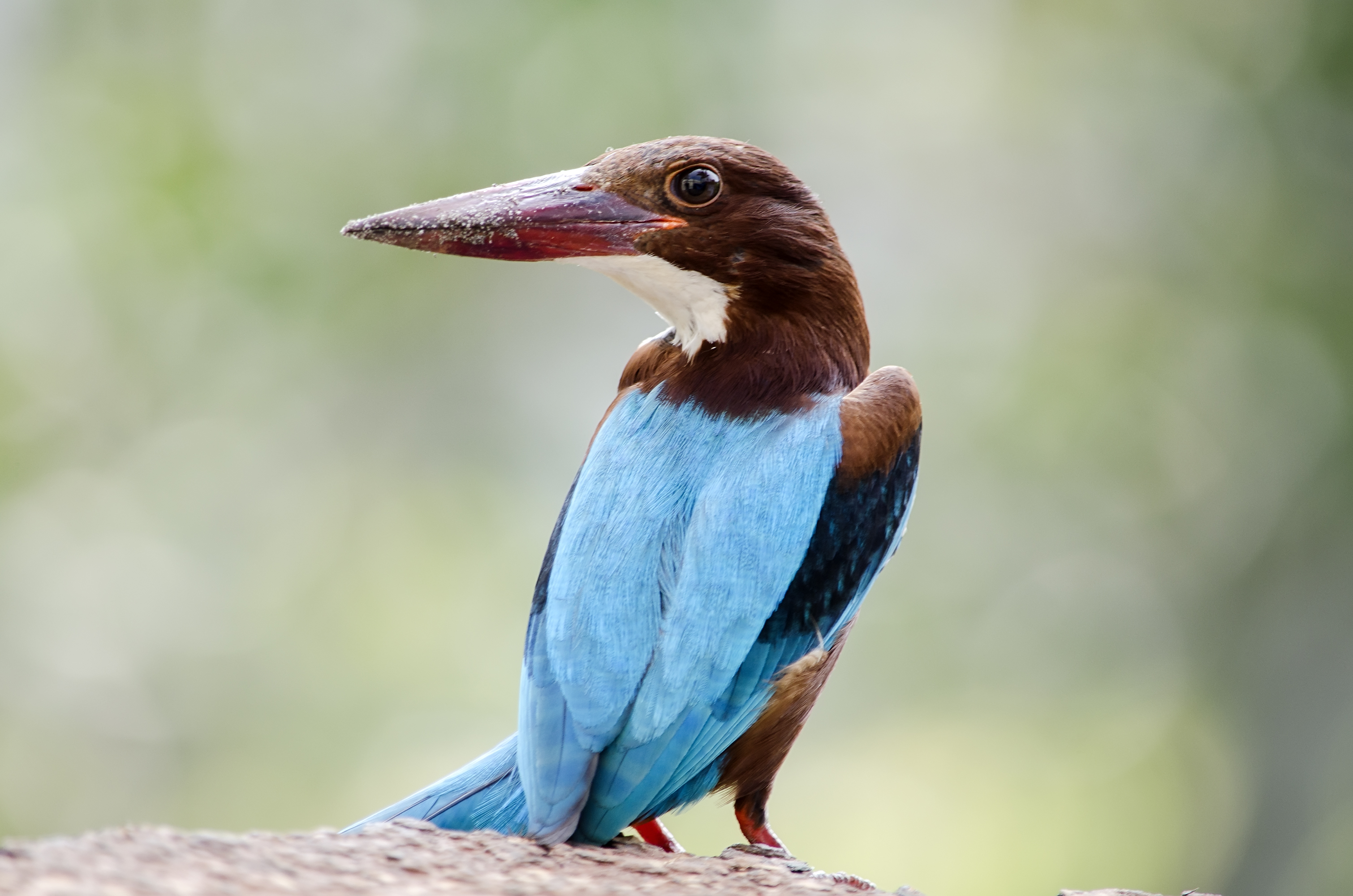
White-throated kingfisher

- Oriental dwarf kingfisher, Ceyx erithaca (vagrant reported from Horamavu in 2017)
- Common kingfisher, Alcedo atthis
- Stork-billed kingfisher, Halcyon capensis (vagrant except in the Kaveri river valley area)
- White-throated kingfisher, Halcyon smyrnensis (breeding resident)
- Black-capped kingfisher, Halcyon pileata (vagrant)
- Pied kingfisher, Ceryle rudis

=== Family: Meropidae ===
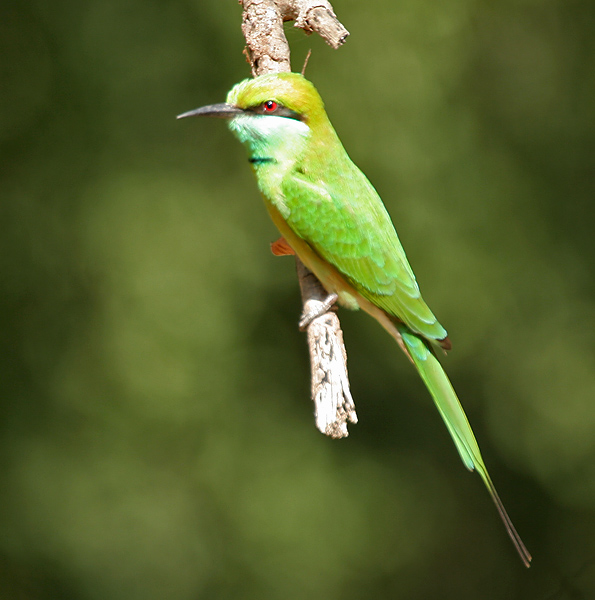
Asian green bee-eater

- Blue-bearded bee-eater, Nyctyornis athertoni (Bengaluru is the type locality, but rare and known only from the Bannerghatta area)
- Asian green bee-eater, Merops orientalis
- Blue-tailed bee-eater, Merops philippinus
- European bee-eater, Merops apiaster (high numbers come as passage migrants in the Kaveri Valley during winter)
- Chestnut-headed bee-eater, Merops leschenaulti (vagrant)

== Bucerotiformes ==
=== Family: Upupidae ===
- Hoopoe, Upupa epops

=== Family: Bucerotidae ===
- Indian grey hornbill, Ocyceros birostris

== Piciformes ==
=== Family: Picidae ===
- Eurasian wryneck, Jynx torquilla (rare with records from GKVK and the Valley School area)
- Brown-capped pygmy woodpecker, Yungipicus nanus
- Yellow-crowned woodpecker, Leiopicus mahrattensis
- Rufous woodpecker, Micropternus brachyurus (rare, recorded mainly from Bannerghatta and Kaveri Valley)
- Lesser yellownape, Picus chlorolophus (one recent record from Nandi Hills, could be found in Cauvery WLS)
- Streak-throated woodpecker, Picus xanthopygaeus (found mainly in Bannerghatta forest)
- Black-rumped flameback, Dinopium benghalense
- White-naped woodpecker, Chrysocolaptes festivus

=== Family: Megalaimidae ===
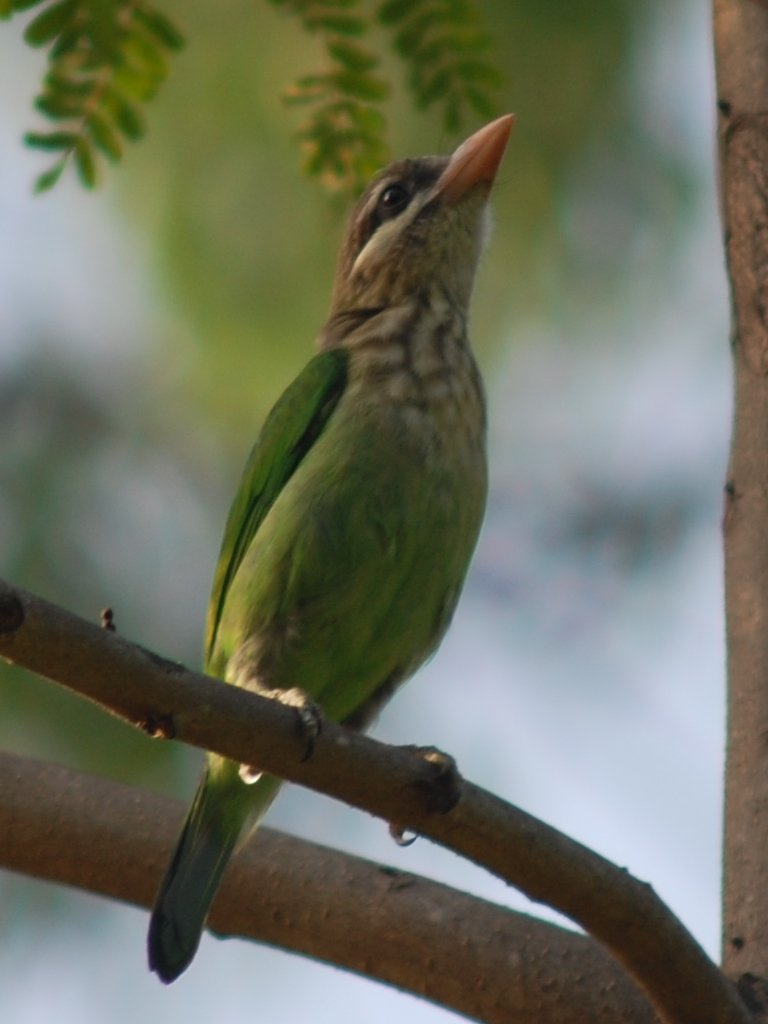
White-cheeked barbet

- Brown-headed barbet, Psilopogon zeylanicus (rare)
- White-cheeked barbet, Psilopogon viridis (breeding resident)
- Coppersmith barbet, Psilopogon haemacephalus (breeding resident)

== Passeriformes ==
=== Family: Pittidae ===
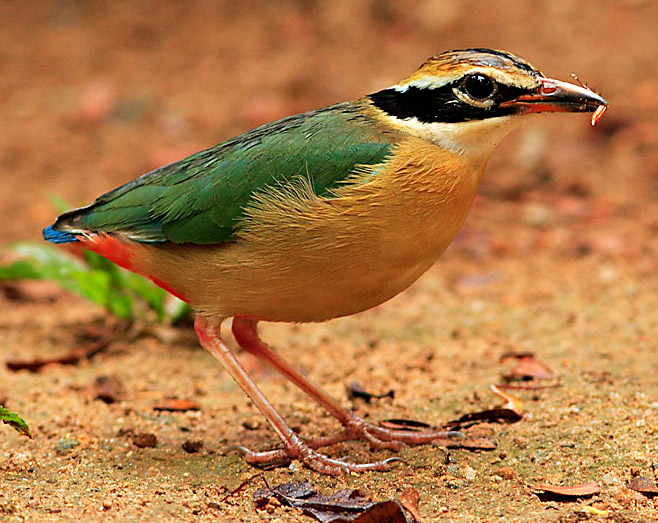
Indian pitta, a colourful but secretive migrant

- Indian pitta, Pitta brachyura

=== Family: Tephrodornithidae ===
- Common woodshrike, Tephrodornis pondicerianus

=== Family: Artamidae ===
- Ashy woodswallow, Artamus fuscus

=== Family: Aegithinidae ===
- Common iora, Aegithina tiphia
- Marshall's iora, Aegithina nigrolutea (nearest records from Maidenahalli and Kaveri Valley)

=== Family: Campephagidae ===
- Large cuckooshrike, Coracina macei
- Black-winged cuckooshrike, Lalage melaschistos (records only from IISc campus and Nandi Hills)
- Black-headed cuckooshrike, Lalage melanoptera
- Small minivet, Pericrocotus cinnamomeus
- White-bellied minivet, Pericrocotus erythropygius (one recent record in Kaveri valley)
- Ashy minivet, Pericrocotus divaricatus
- Swinhoe's minivet, Pericrocotus cantonensis (vagrant, one straggler seen along with Ashy minivet at GKVK)

=== Family: Laniidae ===
- Brown shrike, Lanius cristatus (regular winter visitor)
  - Lanius cristatus lucionensis (rare)
- Isabelline shrike, Lanius isabellinus (rare. Photo record 7 December 2008)
- Bay-backed shrike, Lanius vittatus
- Long-tailed shrike, Lanius schach
- Great grey shrike, Lanius excubitor (rare, reported mainly from Maidenahalli)

=== Family: Oriolidae ===
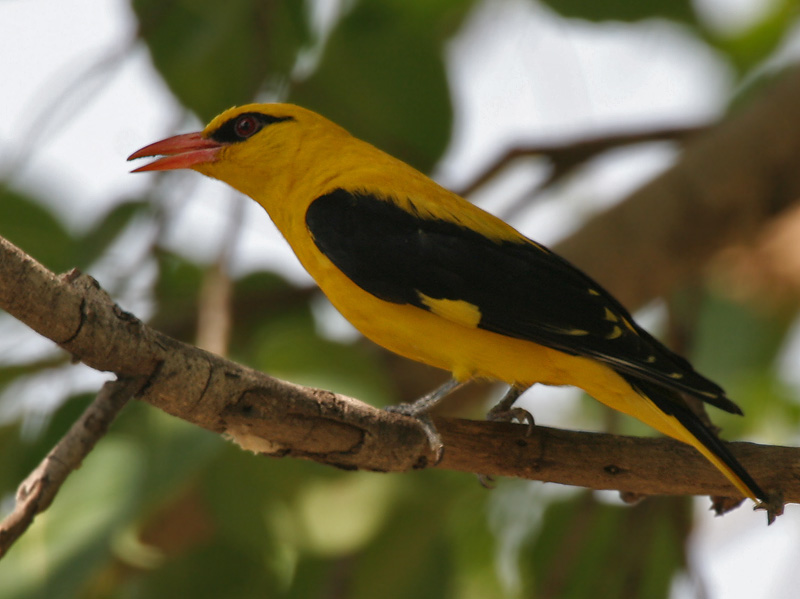
Indian golden oriole

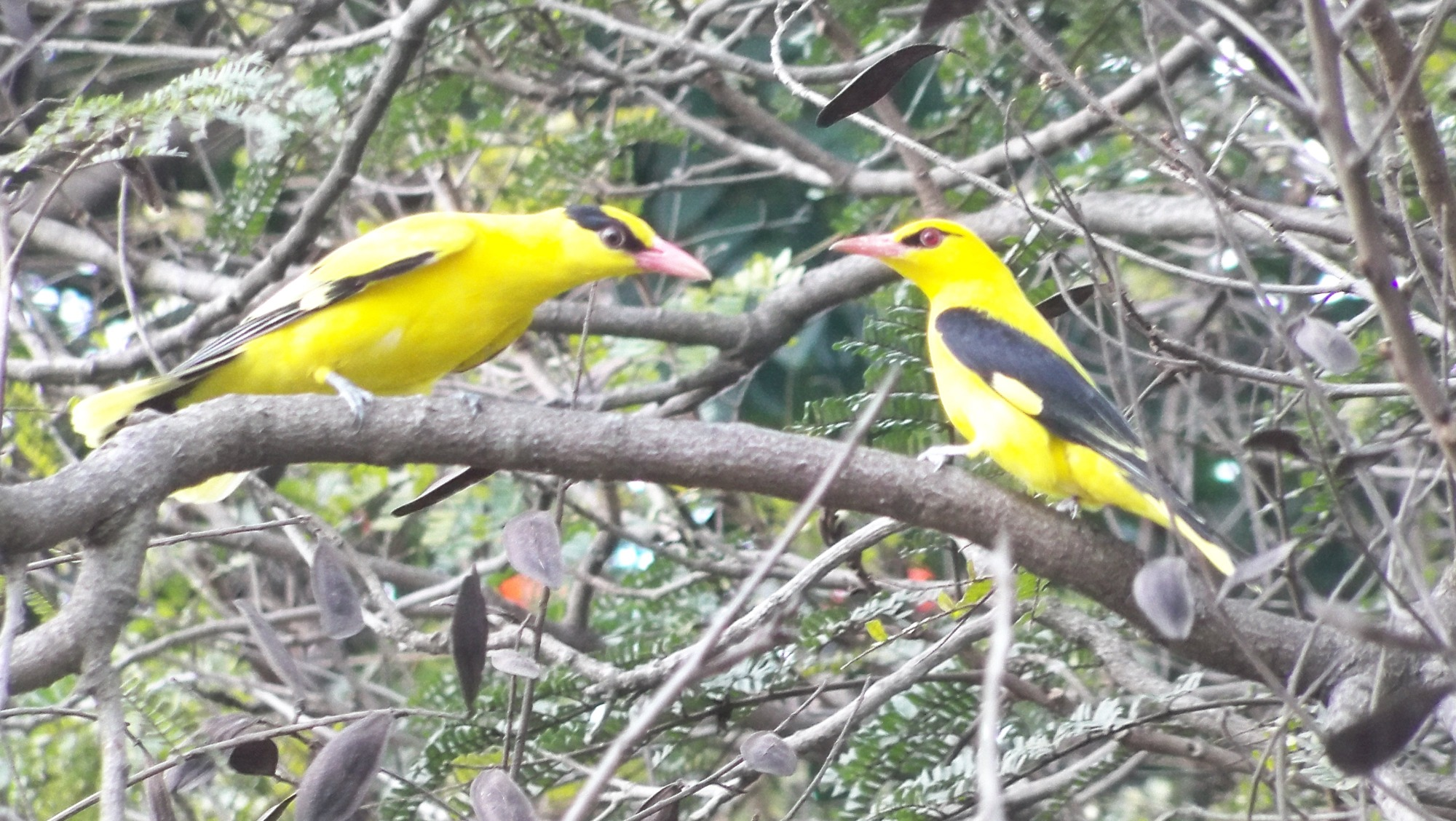
Black-naped oriole with Indian golden oriole

- Indian golden oriole, Oriolus kundoo
- Black-naped oriole, Oriolus chinensis (not rare, but doesn't winter as profusely as Indian golden)
- Black-hooded oriole, Oriolus xanthornus

=== Family: Dicruridae ===
- Black drongo, Dicrurus macrocercus
- Ashy drongo, Dicrurus leucophaeus
- Bronzed drongo, Dicrurus aeneus (records from Bannerghatta forest and Pearl Valley region)
- Greater racket-tailed drongo, Dicrurus paradiseus (records from Bannerghatta region)
- White-bellied drongo, Dicrurus caerulescens
- Hair-crested drongo, Dicrurus hottentottus

=== Family: Rhipiduridae ===
- White-spotted fantail, Rhipidura albogularis
- White-browed fantail, Rhipidura aureola

=== Family: Monarchidae ===
- Black-naped monarch, Hypothymis azurea
- Indian paradise flycatcher, Terpsiphone paradisi

=== Family: Corvidae ===
- Rufous treepie, Dendrocitta vagabunda
- White-bellied treepie, Dendrocitta leucogastra (historic, possibly in error)
- House crow, Corvus splendens
- Indian jungle crow, Corvus culminatus

=== Family: Stenostiridae ===
- Grey-headed canary flycatcher, Culicicapa ceylonensis (historic records, only recent records from Bannerghatta National Park and Indian Institute of Science)

=== Family: Paridae ===
- Cinereous tit, Parus cinereus
- White-winged tit, Parus nuchalis (historic record from Bengaluru, more recent records only from the Kaveri valley)
- Indian black-lored tit, Machlolophus aplonotus (historic)

=== Family: Alaudidae ===
- Singing bushlark, Mirafra cantillans (possibly misidentified. Records known from near Mysore and Jayamangali Black Buck Reserve)
- Indian bushlark, Mirafra erythroptera
- Jerdon's bushlark, Mirafra affinis
- Ashy-crowned sparrow-lark, Eremopterix griseus
- Rufous-tailed lark, Ammomanes phoenicura
- Greater short-toed lark, Calandrella brachydactyla
- Mongolian short-toed lark, Calandrella dukhunensis (high numbers still winter at Hesaraghatta)
- Sykes's lark, Galerida deva (known only from the Thippagondanahalli Reservoir area and Hesaraghatta)
- Oriental skylark, Alauda gulgula

=== Family: Pycnonotidae ===
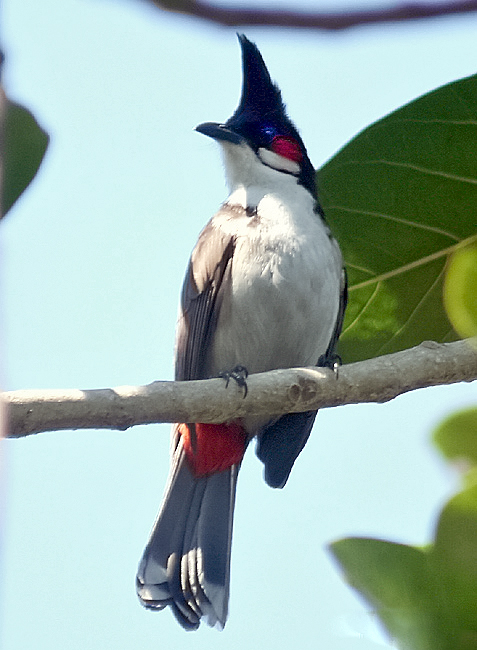
Red-whiskered bulbul

- Red-whiskered bulbul, Pycnonotus jocosus (earliest published record of four specimens of this bird from Bengaluru was collected by HG Walton between 15 and 20 January 1899 said to be in Bombay Natural History Society collection. This bird was once considered rare around Bengaluru but quite common in Nandi Hills.)
- White-eared bulbul, Pycnonotus leucotis (possible escapee)
- Red-vented bulbul, Pycnonotus cafer
- Yellow-throated bulbul, Pycnonotus xantholaemus
- White-browed bulbul, Pycnonotus luteolus

=== Family: Hirundinidae ===
- Sand martin/Pale martin, Riparia riparia/Riparia diluta (vagrant)
- Grey-throated martin, Riparia chinensis
- Dusky crag martin, Ptyonoprogne concolor
- Common house martin, Delichon urbicum (rare with very few records, usually seen amongst mixed flocks)
- Barn swallow, Hirundo rustica
- Pacific swallow, Hirundo tahitica
- Wire-tailed swallow, Hirundo smithii
- Red-rumped swallow, Cecropis daurica
- Streak-throated swallow, Hirundo fluvicola

=== Family: Phylloscopidae ===
- Tickell's leaf warbler, Phylloscopus affinis
- Sulphur-bellied warbler, Phylloscopus griseolus
- Yellow-browed warbler, Phylloscopus inornatus (rare, recent records from Lalbagh and Bannerghatta regions)
- Hume's leaf warbler, Phylloscopus humei (Nandi Hills)
- Tytler's leaf warbler, Phylloscopus tytleri (Nandi Hills)
- Common chiffchaff, Phylloscopus collybita (historic, rare vagrant at Nandi Hills)
- Green warbler, Phylloscopus nitidus
- Greenish warbler, Phylloscopus trochiloides
- Large-billed leaf warbler, Phylloscopus magnirostris
- Western crowned warbler, Phylloscopus occipitalis

=== Family: Acrocephalidae ===
- Paddyfield warbler, Acrocephalus agricola
- Blyth's reed warbler, Acrocephalus dumetorum
- Clamorous reed warbler, Acrocephalus stentoreus
- Thick-billed warbler, Arundinax aedon
- Sykes's warbler, Iduna rama
- Booted warbler, Iduna caligata

=== Family: Cisticolidae ===
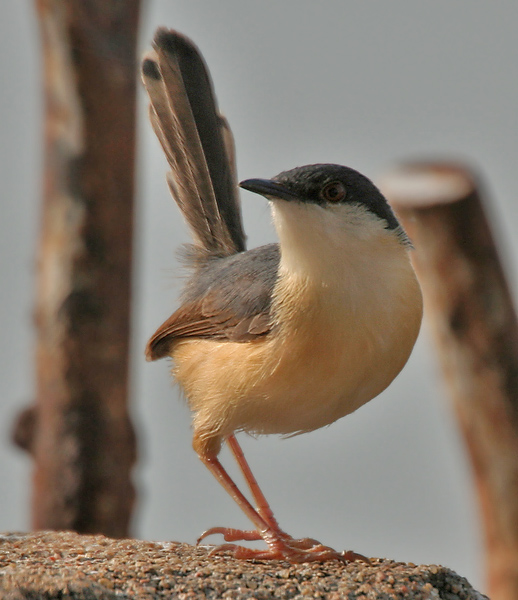
Ashy prinia or ashy wren-warbler

- Zitting cisticola, Cisticola juncidis
- Grey-breasted prinia, Prinia hodgsonii
- Jungle prinia, Prinia sylvatica
- Ashy prinia, Prinia socialis
- Plain prinia, Prinia inornata
- Rufous-fronted prinia, Prinia buchanani (nearest records from Maidenahalli)
- Common tailorbird, Orthotomus sutorius

=== Family: Locustellidae ===
- Common grasshopper warbler, Locustella naevia (rare, sparse records around Bengaluru)
- Pallas grasshopper warbler, Helopsaltes certhiola (rare, one recent record from Anekal region)
- Bristled grassbird, Chaetornis striata (one record from Hoskote Lake)

=== Family: Pellorneidae ===
- Puff-throated babbler, Pellorneum ruficeps

=== Family: Timaliidae ===
- Indian scimitar babbler, Pomatorhinus horsfieldii
- Tawny-bellied babbler, Dumetia hyperythra

=== Family: Leiothrichidae ===
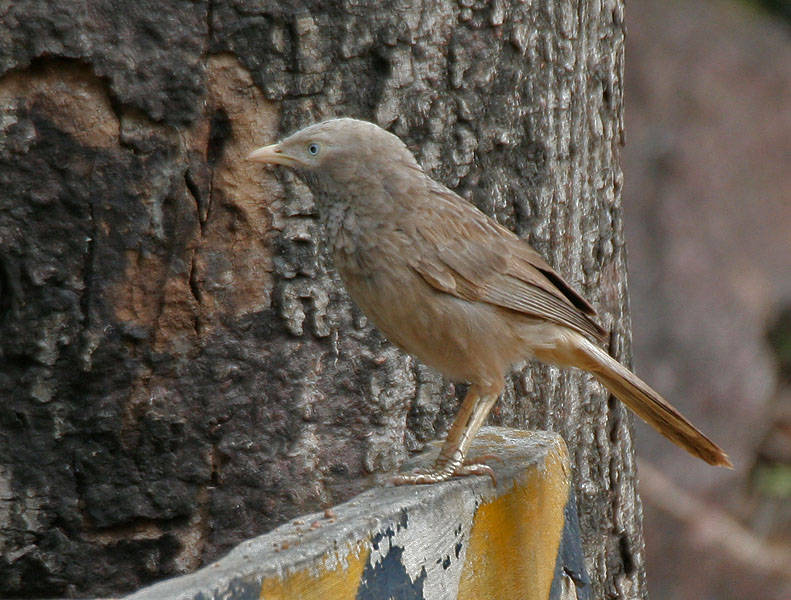
Yellow-billed babbler or white-headed babbler, the commonest babbler in urban areas

- Common babbler, Argya caudata
- Large grey babbler, Argya malcolmi
- Rufous babbler, Argya subrufa (escaped individual seen near Cubbon Park)
- Jungle babbler, Argya striata
- Yellow-billed babbler, Argya affinis
- Brown-cheeked fulvetta, Alcippe poioicephala (one recent record from Bannerghatta Forest-Shivanahalli region)

=== Family: Sittidae ===
- Velvet-fronted nuthatch, Sitta frontalis (one recent record from Valley School)

=== Family: Sylviidae ===
- Eastern Orphean warbler, Sylvia crassirostris
- Lesser whitethroat, Sylvia curruca (populations not ascertained reliably)
  - Hume's lesser whitethroat, S. c. althaea (taxonomy dependant)
- Yellow-eyed babbler, Chrysomma sinense

=== Family: Zosteropidae ===
- Indian white-eye, Zosterops palpebrosus

=== Family: Sturnidae ===
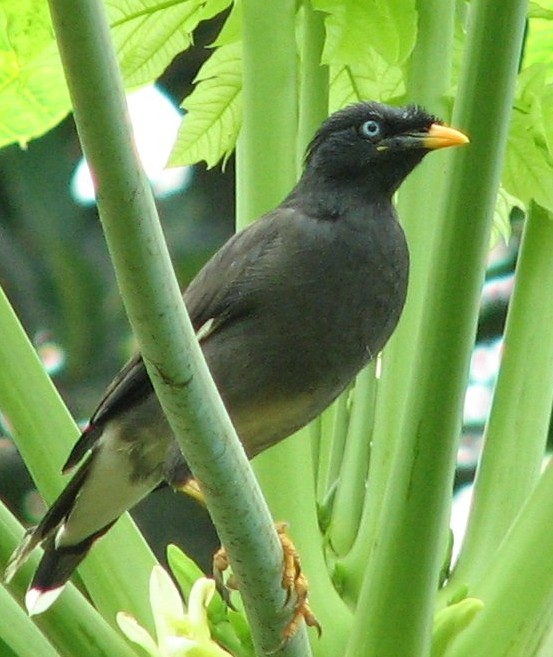

- Chestnut-tailed starling, Sturnia malabarica (winter visitor)
- Malabar starling, Sturnia blythii (vagrant, historic record from GKVK campus)
- Brahminy starling, Sturnia pagodarum (resident)
- Rosy starling, Pastor roseus (winter visitor)
- Common starling, Sturnus vulgaris (vagrant)
- Common myna, Acridotheres tristis (resident)
- Jungle myna, Acridotheres fuscus (resident)

=== Family: Turdidae ===
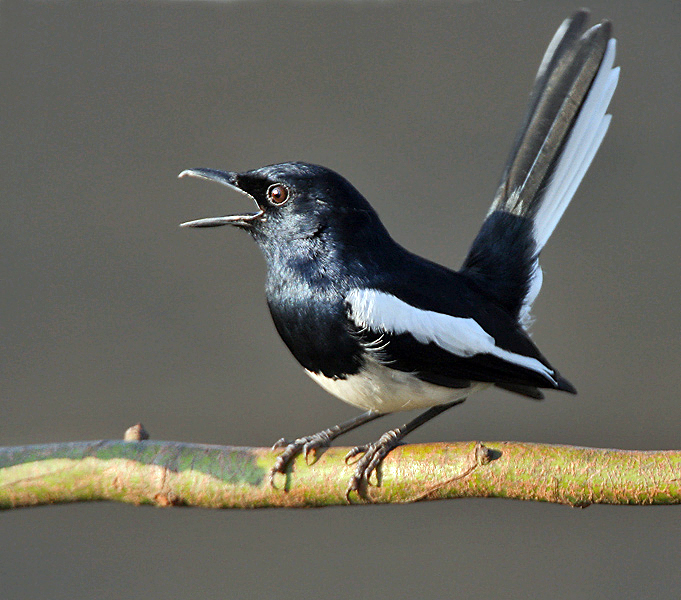
Oriental magpie robin found in gardens

- Pied thrush, Geokichla wardii (winter visitor, regular only in the Nandi hills)
- White-throated orange-headed thrush, Geokichla citrina cyanota
- Scaly thrush, Zoothera dauma (historic)
- Tickell's thrush, Turdus unicolor (once in 2005 at Lalbagh, records popping up elsewhere)
- Indian blackbird, Turdus simillimus (winter, regular only in the Nandi hills. Older records of common blackbird, Turdus merula, may be attributed to this species)
- Eyebrowed thrush, Turdus obscurus (vagrant)

=== Family: Muscicapidae ===
- Northern wheatear, Oenanthe oenanthe (one recent record from Jayamangali Blackbuck Reserve, a first for Karnataka)
- Blue-capped rock thrush, Monticola cinclorhyncha (winter visitor)
- Blue rock thrush, Monticola solitarius (winter visitor in rocky areas)
- Common rock thrush, Monticola saxatilis (vagrant)
- Malabar whistling thrush, Myophonus horsfieldii (vagrant at UAS, Hebbal. From 2005 found in the Nandi Hills)
- Bluethroat, Luscinia svecica
- Indian blue robin, Luscinia brunnea (winter, regular in the Nandi hills)
- Siberian rubythroat, Calliope calliope (nearest record from Maidenahalli and the Savandurga area)
- Oriental magpie robin, Copsychus saularis (resident breeder)
- White-rumped shama, Copsychus malabaricus (rare resident, known only from the JP Nagar Reserve Forest (Doresanipalya), Bannerghatta forest area, Valley School areas and further away in the Kaveri valley)
- Indian robin, Saxicoloides fulicatus (resident, found in open scrub in the outskirts)
- Black redstart, Phoenicurus ochruros (winter)
- Siberian stonechat, Saxicola maurus (winter)
- Pied bush chat, Saxicola caprata (resident, found in open scrub in the outskirts)
- Asian brown flycatcher, Muscicapa dauurica (winter)
- Brown-breasted flycatcher, Muscicapa muttui (winter)
- Yellow-rumped flycatcher, Ficedula zanthopygia (winter, vagrant)
- Rusty-tailed flycatcher, Ficedula ruficauda (winter, rare)
- Red-breasted flycatcher, Ficedula parva (winter)
- Red-throated flycatcher, Ficedula albicilla (winter)
- Kashmir flycatcher, Ficedula subrubra (rare, passage)
- Ultramarine flycatcher, Ficedula superciliaris (winter, regular in the Nandi hills)
- Black-and-orange flycatcher, Ficedula nigrorufa (vagrant – two records. Confirmation desirable, recent records in Karnataka only from the shola forests in the Brahmagiri and Bababudan Hill ranges)
- Verditer flycatcher, Eumyias thalassina (winter, not uncommon in scrub forest areas)
- Nilgiri flycatcher, Eumyias albicaudatus (historic and needs confirmation)
- Blue-throated flycatcher, Cyornis rubeculoides (winter, possibly in passage)
- Tickell's blue flycatcher, Cyornis tickelliae (resident breeder)

=== Family: Chloropseidae ===
- Jerdon's leafbird, Chloropsis jerdoni
- Golden-fronted leafbird, Chloropsis aurifrons

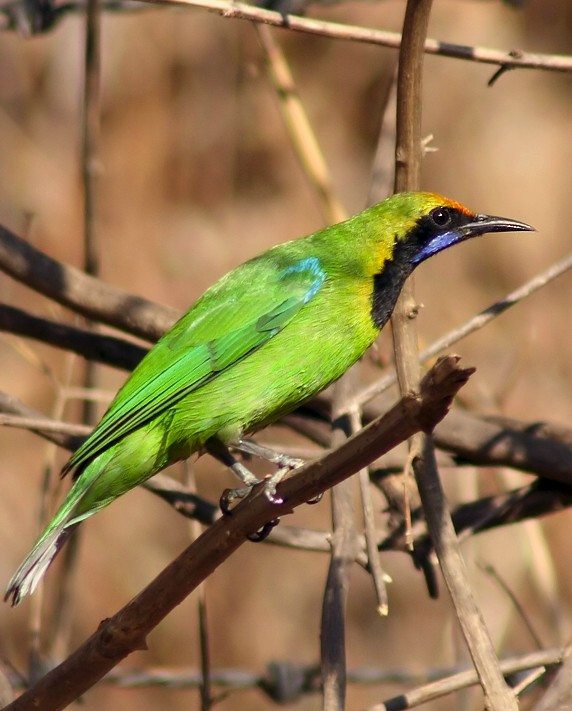
Golden-fronted leafbird

=== Family: Dicaeidae ===
- Thick-billed flowerpecker, Dicaeum agile (rare)
- Pale-billed flowerpecker, Dicaeum erythrorynchos

=== Family: Nectariniidae ===
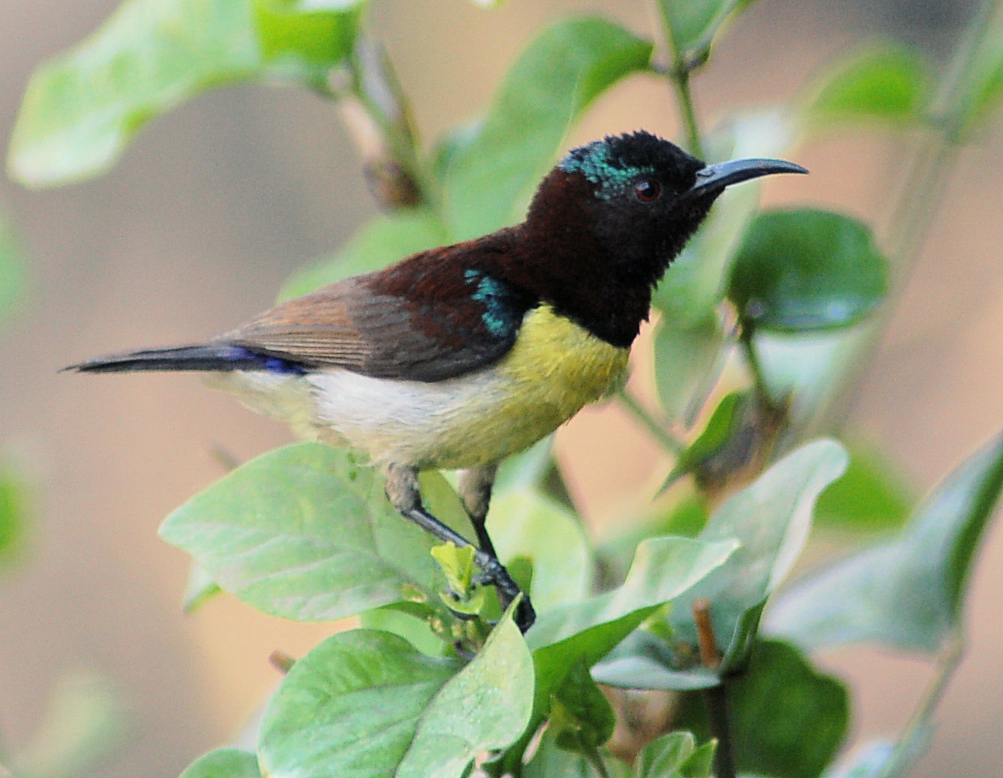
Male purple-rumped sunbird

- Purple-rumped sunbird, Nectarinia zeylonica
- Purple sunbird, Cinnyris asiaticus
- Loten's sunbird, Cinnyris lotenius
- Crimson-backed sunbird, Leptocoma minima (monsoon migrant to Nandi Hills)

=== Family: Passeridae ===
- House sparrow, Passer domesticus
- Yellow-throated sparrow, Gymnoris xanthocollis

=== Family: Ploceidae ===
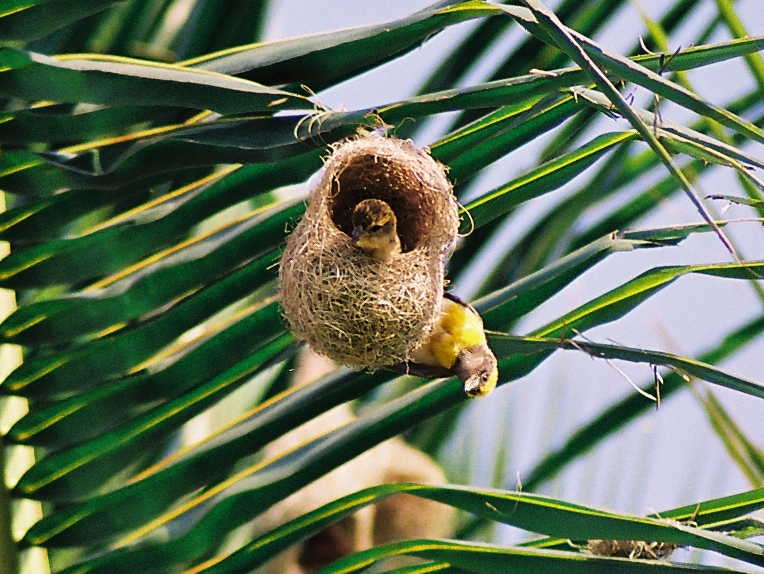
Baya weavers at partly built nest

- Streaked weaver, Ploceus manyar
- Baya weaver, Ploceus philippinus
- Bengal weaver, Ploceus benghalensis (one known resident population from Hoskote Lake – vagrant elsewhere)

=== Family: Estrildidae ===
- Red munia, Amandava amandava
- Indian silverbill, Euodice malabarica
- White-rumped munia, Lonchura striata
- Scaly-breasted munia, Lonchura punctulata
- Tricoloured munia, Lochura malacca

=== Family: Motacillidae ===
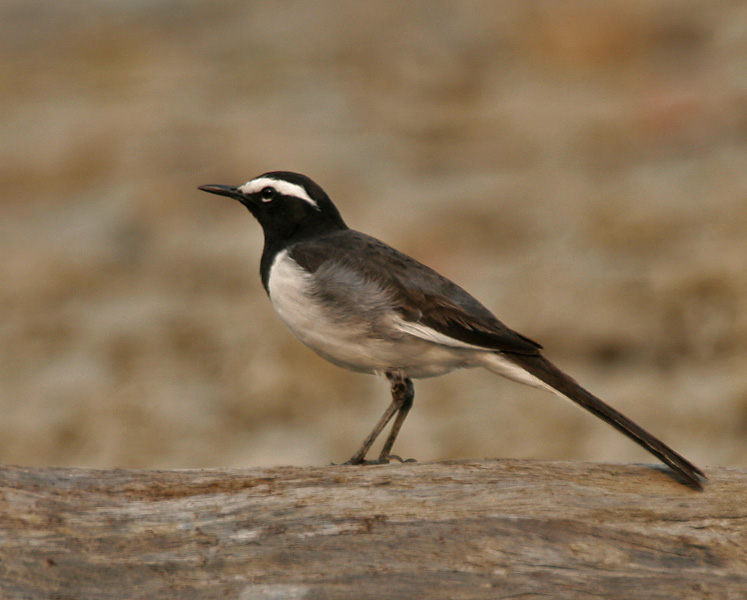
White-browed wagtail

- Forest wagtail, Dendronanthus indicus
- White wagtail, Motacilla alba
- White-browed wagtail, Motacilla maderaspatensis
- Citrine wagtail, Motacilla citreola citreola
- Yellow wagtail, Motacilla flava
- Eastern yellow wagtail, Motacilla tschutschensis (mostly recent records, in Hesaraghatta and Hoskote areas)
- Grey wagtail, Motacilla cinerea
- Richard's pipit, Anthus richardi
- Red-throated pipit, Anthus cervinus
- Paddyfield pipit, Anthus rufulus
- Tawny pipit, Anthus campestris (recent records from Maidenahalli)
- Blyth's pipit, Anthus godlewskii
- Long-billed pipit, Anthus similis
- Tree pipit, Anthus trivialis
- Olive-backed pipit, Anthus hodgsoni (mainly Nandi Hills, some arrive at Namadachilume forest)

=== Family: Fringillidae ===
- Common rosefinch, Carpodacus erythrinus (winter visitor)

=== Family: Emberizidae ===
- Black-headed bunting, Emberiza melanocephala (historic)
- Red-headed bunting, Emberiza bruniceps (historic)
- Grey-necked bunting, Emberiza buchanani

== See also ==
- Birdwatchers' Field Club of Bengaluru
