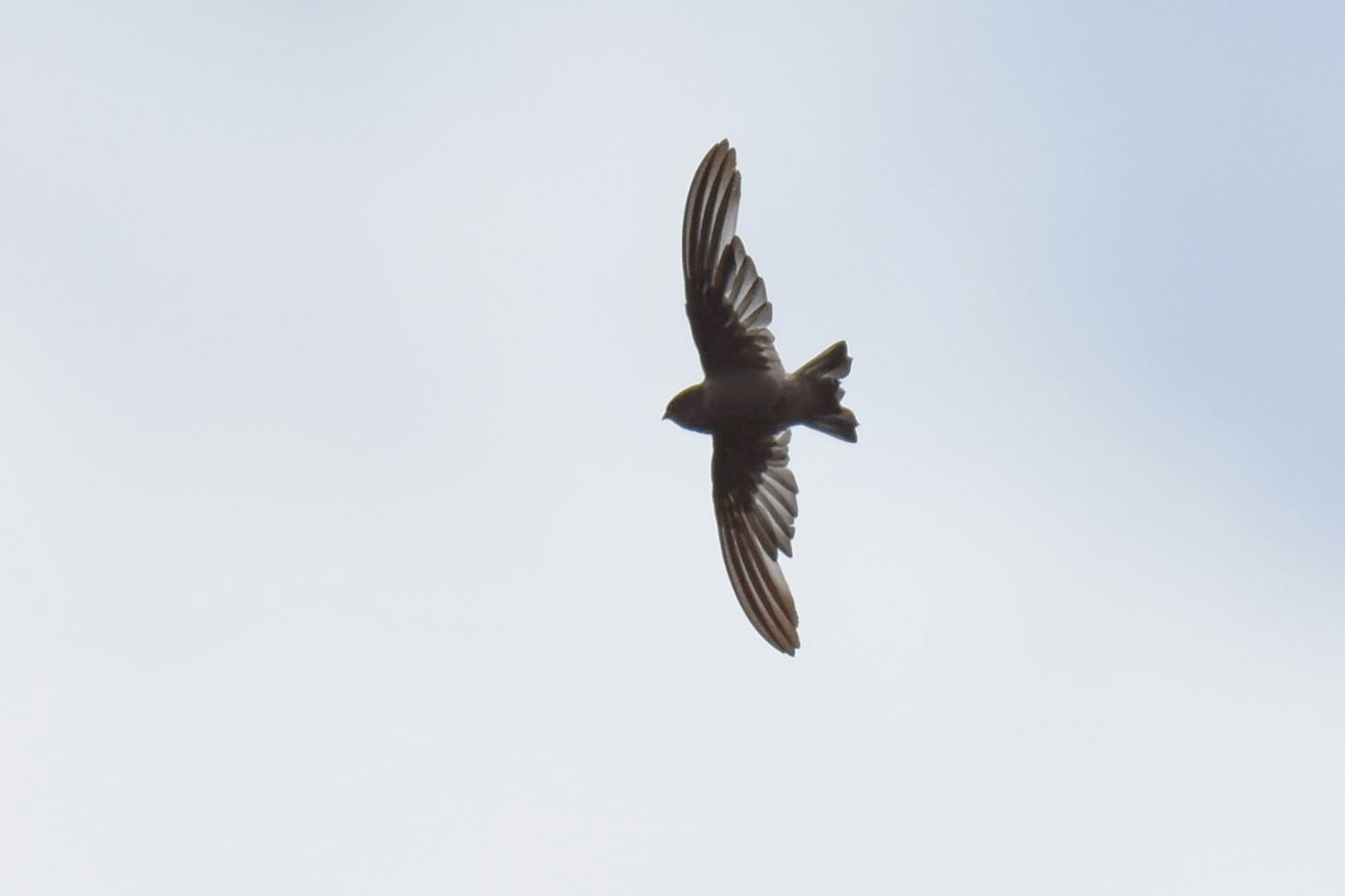

Conservation status
- Least Concern (IUCN 3.1)

Scientific classification
- Kingdom: Animalia
- Phylum: Chordata
- Class: Aves
- Order: Apodiformes
- Family: Apodidae
- Genus: Zoonavena
- Species: Z. grandidieri

Binomial name
- Zoonavena grandidieri (Verreaux, 1867)

= Madagascar spinetail =

Species of bird

The Madagascar spinetail, Madagascan spinetail or Malagasy spinetail (Zoonavena grandidieri) is a species of swift in the family Apodidae. It is found in Comoros, Madagascar, and Mayotte.
