= Birdwatchers' Field Club of Bengaluru =

Indian birdwatching club

The Birdwatchers' Field Club of Bangalore is a birdwatching club in Bangalore founded in the 1970s.

== Activities ==
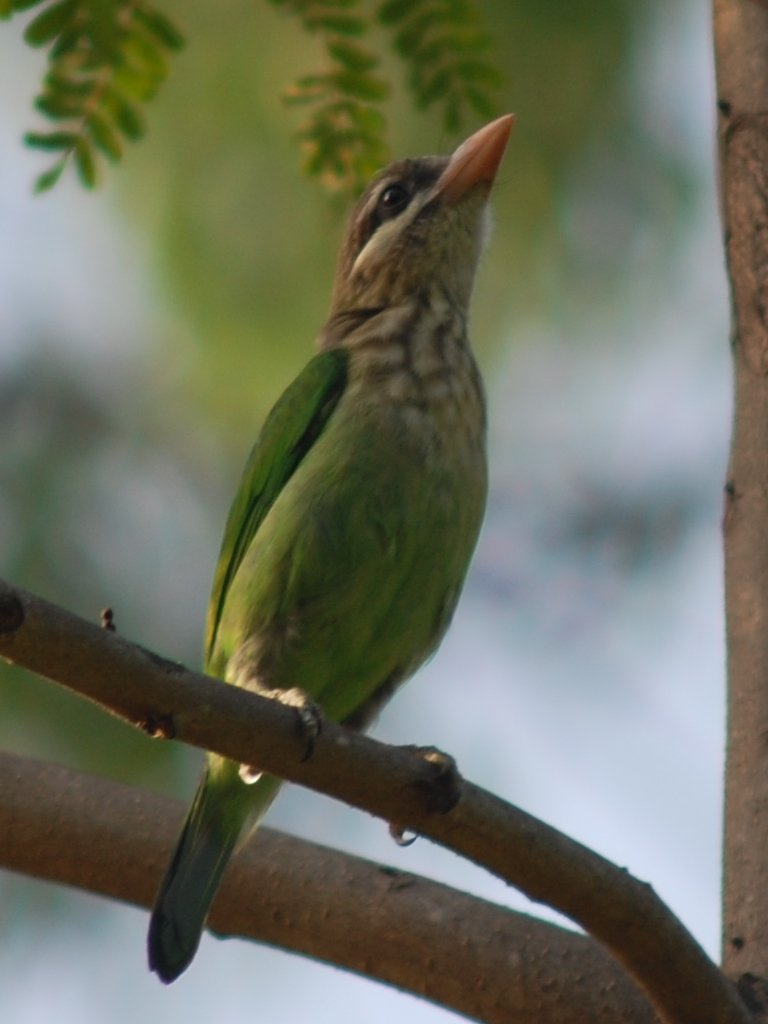
Birds in the region: white-cheeked barbet

The group has been active in conducting mid-winter waterfowl censuses. The club was also involved in a survey of wetlands around Bangalore in collaboration with the Forest Department of the Karnataka state and was involved in a comprehensive survey of water quality parameters including chemical, physical and biological status. The results of this survey helped in the creation of action plans for wetland conservation and have helped in highlighting the roles of wetlands in cities.

== Meetups ==
An informal organization, it meets every second Sunday of the month at 7:30 am in the Lalbagh Glass House. No membership fees or other formalities are needed to be a part of the group. Other trips happen at the Hebbal Lake on the 1st Sunday of every month at 7:30 am and near Bannerghatta National Park on the 3rd Sunday of every month at 6:30 am. Intimations for the trips are made on the email discussion group. 4th Sunday around Sarjapur.

== Birds in the region ==
Nearly 390 species of birds have been recorded from the Bangalore region of which around 186 species may be seen with ease.

== Birding locations ==
Schematic map of birding areas in and around Bangalore

Some of the important birding locations in and around Bangalore include

=== Parks ===
- Lal Bagh Botanical gardens – provides garden and wetland habitats
- Bannerghatta National Park – scrub and forest habitat (permission required)

=== Lakes and water bodies ===
- Thippagondanahalli reservoir – (30 km away) deep water lake with open countryside (permission required)
- Hebbal Lake – wetland with numerous waterbirds, especially good in winter
- Puttenahalli Lake Lake – near Yelahanka – small waterbody with surprising birdlife
- Puttenahalli Lake – JP Nagar 7th Phase, near Brigade Millennium – maintained by Puttenahalli Neighbourhood Lake Improvement Trust

=== Others ===
- Nandi Hills – (50 km away) a good habitat for thrushes and forest birds
- Indian Institute of Science Campus (permission required)
- The Valley School – scrub and forest habitat (private property)
- UAS-GKVK campus – scrub and agricultural land (permission required)
- UAS-Hebbal campus – agricultural and garden land (permission required)
- Turahalli reserve forest
- Muninagara, Bannerghatta Outskirts
- Ragihalli, Bannerghatta Outskirts
- Shivanahalli, Bannerghatta Outskirts
- Gulakamale and TK falls

== See also ==
- List of Bangalore birds
