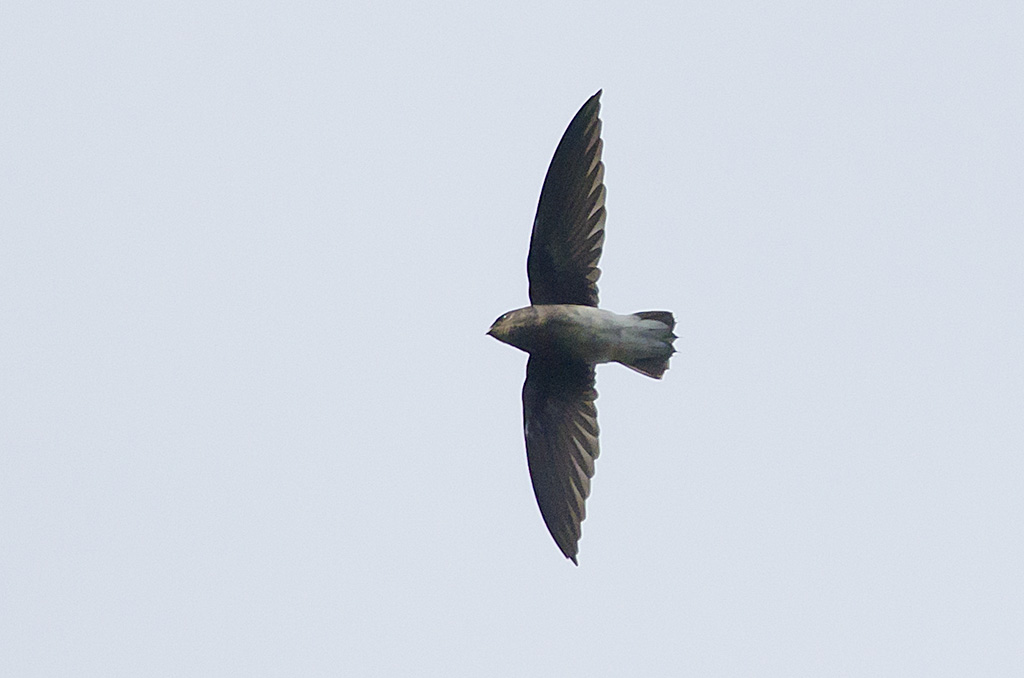

Conservation status
- Least Concern (IUCN 3.1)

Scientific classification
- Kingdom: Animalia
- Phylum: Chordata
- Class: Aves
- Order: Apodiformes
- Family: Apodidae
- Genus: Zoonavena
- Species: Z. sylvatica

Binomial name
- Zoonavena sylvatica (Tickell, 1846)

= White-rumped spinetail =

Species of bird

The white-rumped spinetail or white-rumped needletail (Zoonavena sylvatica) is a species of swift found in the forests of Bangladesh, India (the Western Ghats) and Nepal. It is often seen over waterbodies in the middle of forest. It can resemble a house swift but has a white vent.

== Diet ==
The white-rumped spinetail is insectivorous.
