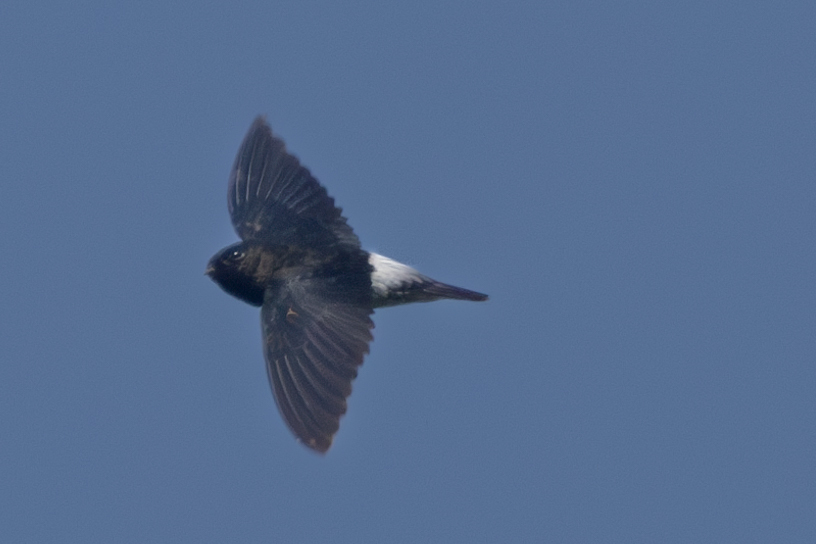

Conservation status
- Least Concern (IUCN 3.1)

Scientific classification
- Kingdom: Animalia
- Phylum: Chordata
- Class: Aves
- Order: Apodiformes
- Family: Apodidae
- Genus: Zoonavena
- Species: Z. thomensis

Binomial name
- Zoonavena thomensis (Hartert, 1900)

= São Tomé spinetail =

Species of bird

The São Tomé spinetail (Zoonavena thomensis) is a species of swift in the family Apodidae. It is endemic to São Tomé and Príncipe, occurring in both São Tomé and Príncipe Islands. The species was described by Ernst Hartert on 1900.

== Habitat ==
The São Tomé spinetail is resident, occupying primary and secondary forests as well as cultivated areas and plantations, from the lowlands to 1500 m in altitude.

== Behaviour ==
The São Tomé spinetail captures small insects in flight, foraging in small flocks of 8 to 10 individuals. The species nests on the sides of hollow trees, constructing open, cupped nests. Breeding seemingly takes place between August and October, and females lay between 2 and 4 eggs. The species does not form breeding colonies, with each pair being solitary.
