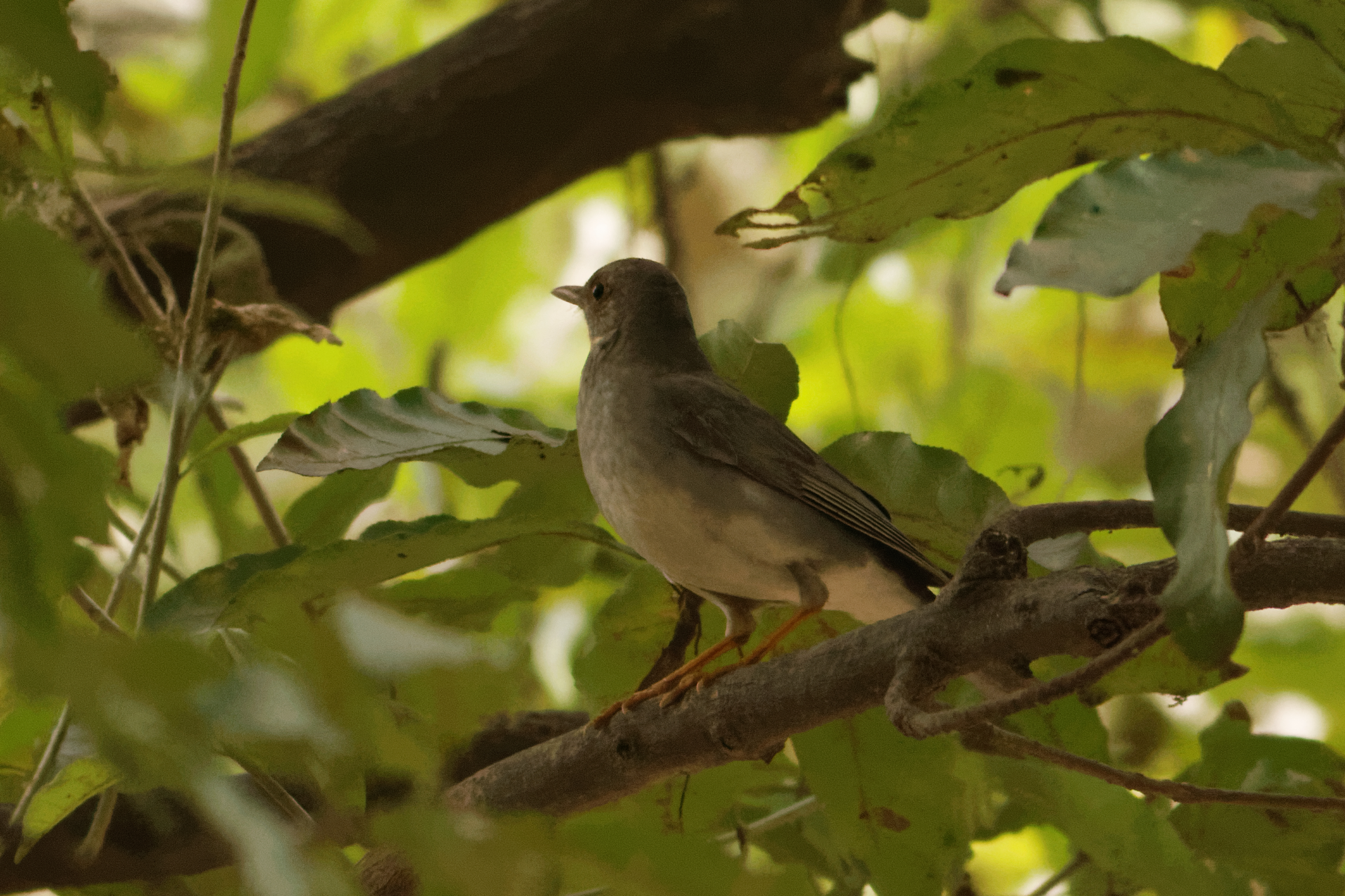
- Male
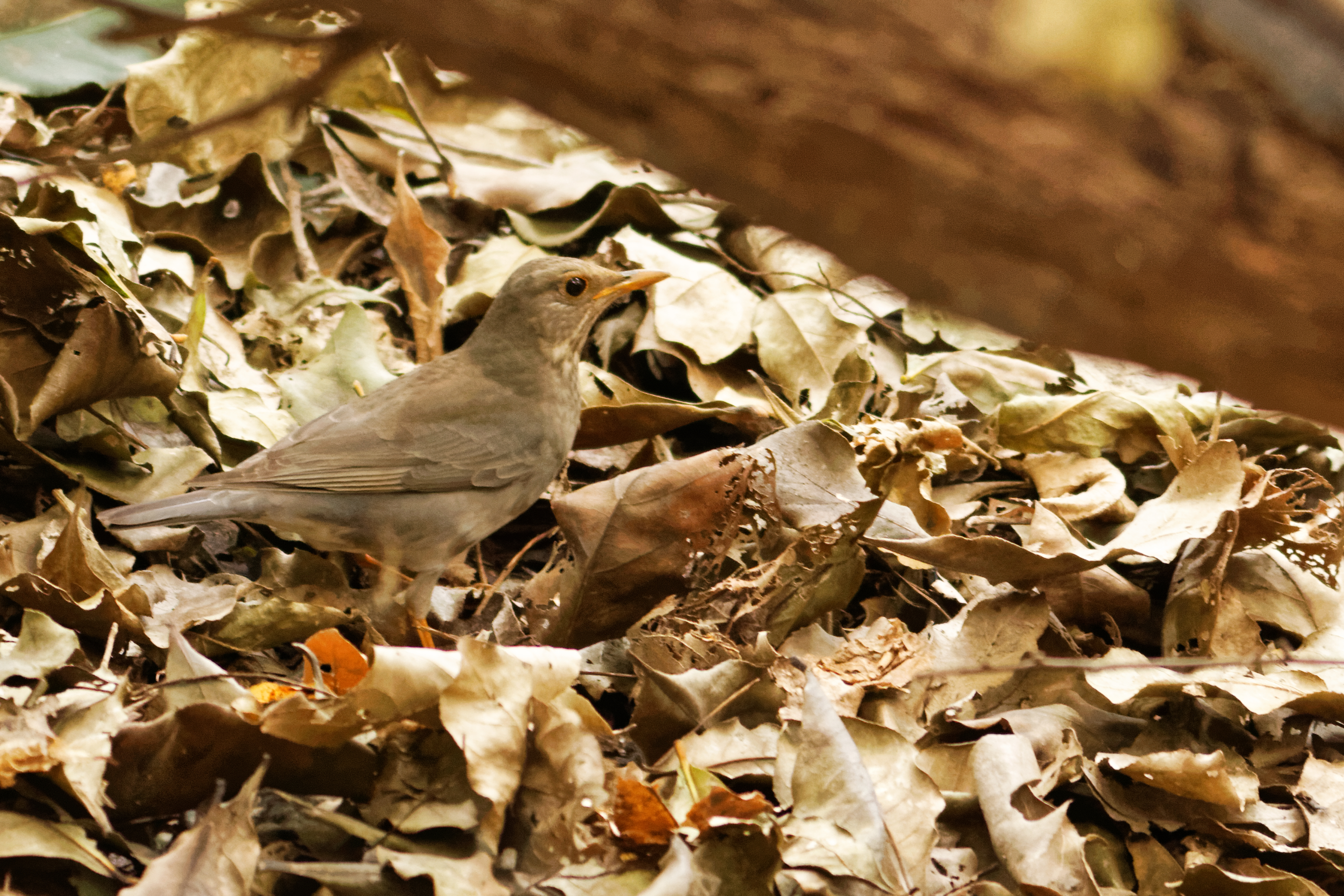
- Female

Conservation status
- Least Concern (IUCN 3.1)

Scientific classification
- Kingdom: Animalia
- Phylum: Chordata
- Class: Aves
- Order: Passeriformes
- Family: Turdidae
- Genus: Turdus
- Species: T. unicolor

Binomial name
- Turdus unicolor Tickell, 1833

= Tickell's thrush =

Species of bird

Tickell's thrush (Turdus unicolor) is a passerine bird in the thrush family Turdidae. It is common in open forest in the Himalayas, and migrates seasonally into peninsular India, Nepal and rarely to Bangladesh.

The name commemorates the British ornithologist Samuel Tickell who collected in India and Burma.

== Description ==
It is a small thrush, 21–25 cm (8.3–9.8 in) long and weighing 57–75 g (2.0–2.6 oz), similar in size to redwing or eyebrowed thrush and distinctly smaller than Indian blackbird. Males have uniform blue-grey upperparts, a whitish belly and vent, while females and young birds have browner upperparts. Adults have yellow beak and legs, while it may be darker in juveniles. There is a yellow eye-ring, which is thinner and fainter than in the Indian blackbird.

== Behaviour and ecology ==
Tickell's thrush builds nests from April to June using mostly dry grass.

== Distribution and habitat ==
It breeds at middle altitudes of 1,200–2,700 m (3,940–8,860 ft) (rarely up to 3,000 m (9,840 ft)) in the Himalayas, from extreme northeastern Afghanistan east through northern Pakistan, northwestern India and Nepal to Sikkim and western Bhutan. It migrates south and to lower altitudes in Pakistan, India, Nepal and Bangladesh in winter. There is one extralimital record, on Heligoland in Germany, on 15 October 1932, one of the most unusual cases of vagrancy known.

The breeding habitat is broadleaf or mixed forest with clearings, including human-altered habitats like orchards and large gardens, where it will feed on lawns. Winter habitats are similar.
