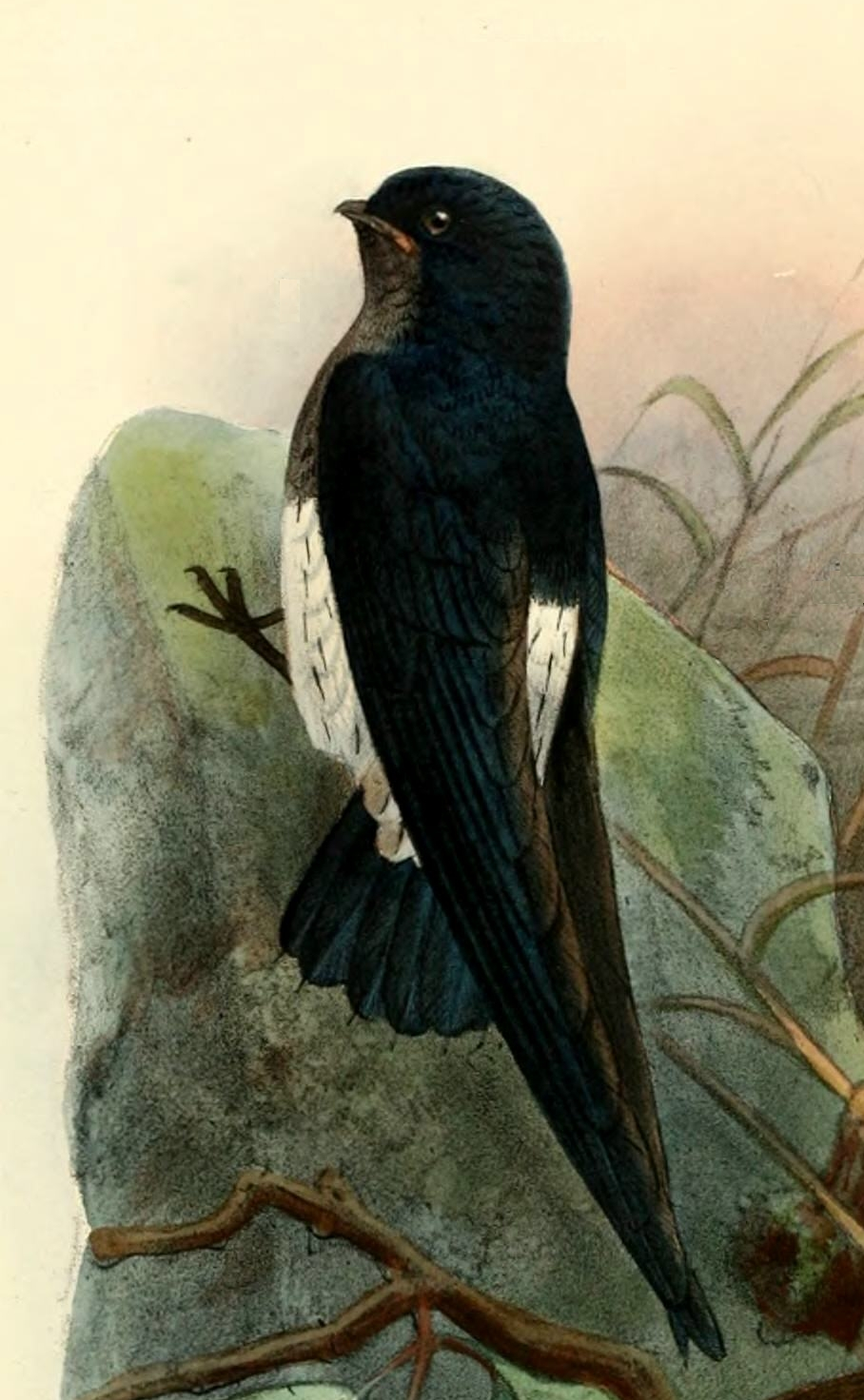
- São Tomé spinetail (Zoonavena thomensis)

Scientific classification
- Kingdom: Animalia
- Phylum: Chordata
- Class: Aves
- Order: Apodiformes
- Family: Apodidae
- Subfamily: Apodinae
- Tribe: Chaeturini
- Genus: Zoonavena; Mathews, 1918

Type species
- Chaetura grandidieri Verreaux, 1867

= Zoonavena =

Genus of birds

Zoonavena is a genus of swift in the family Apodidae. It contains the following species:

- Madagascar spinetail (Zoonavena grandidieri)
- São Tomé spinetail (Zoonavena thomensis)
- White-rumped spinetail (Zoonavena sylvatica)
