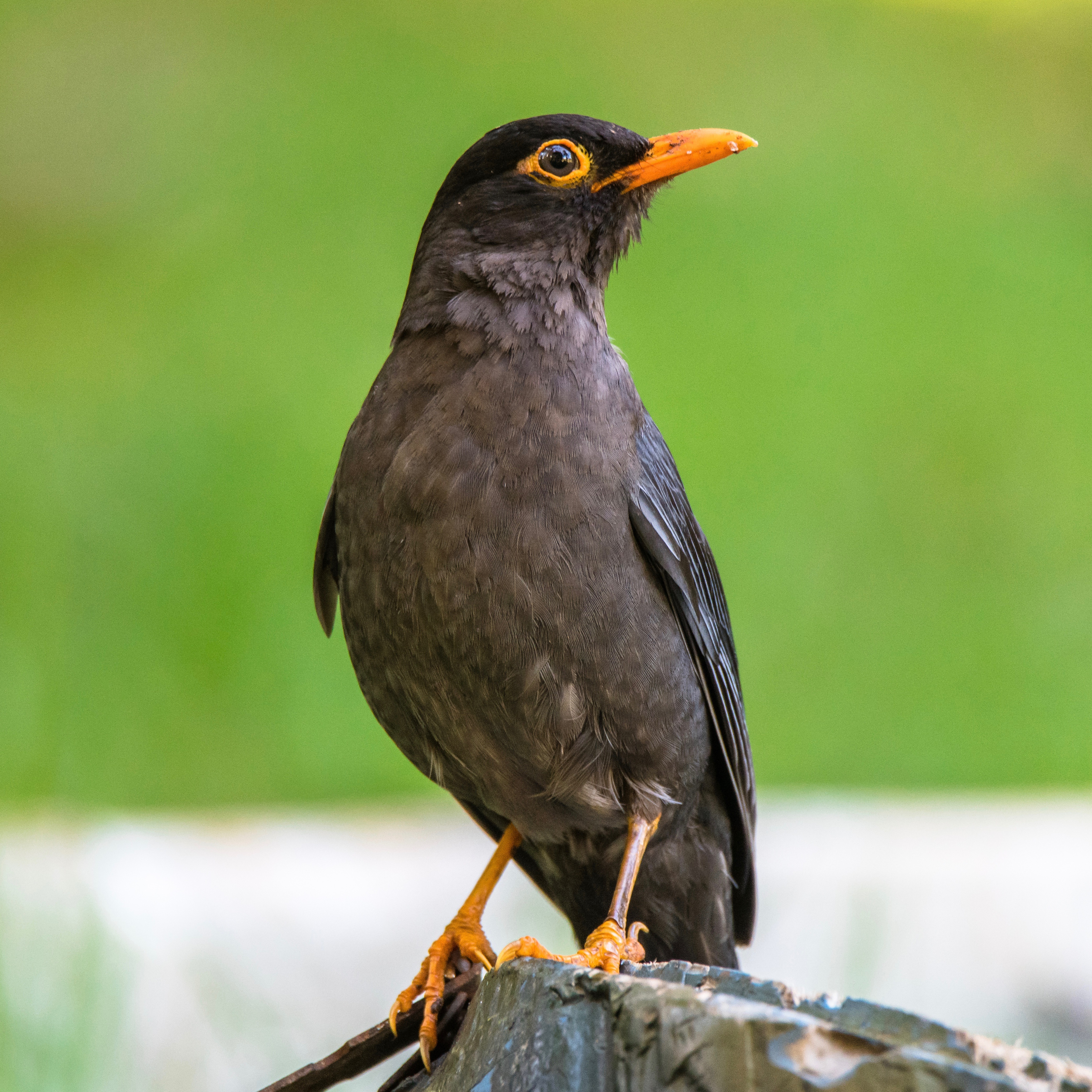
- Male T. s. nigropileus, Kotagiri, India

Conservation status
- Least Concern (IUCN 3.1)

Scientific classification
- Kingdom: Animalia
- Phylum: Chordata
- Class: Aves
- Order: Passeriformes
- Family: Turdidae
- Genus: Turdus
- Species: T. simillimus

Binomial name
- Turdus simillimus Jerdon, 1839

= Indian blackbird =

Species of bird

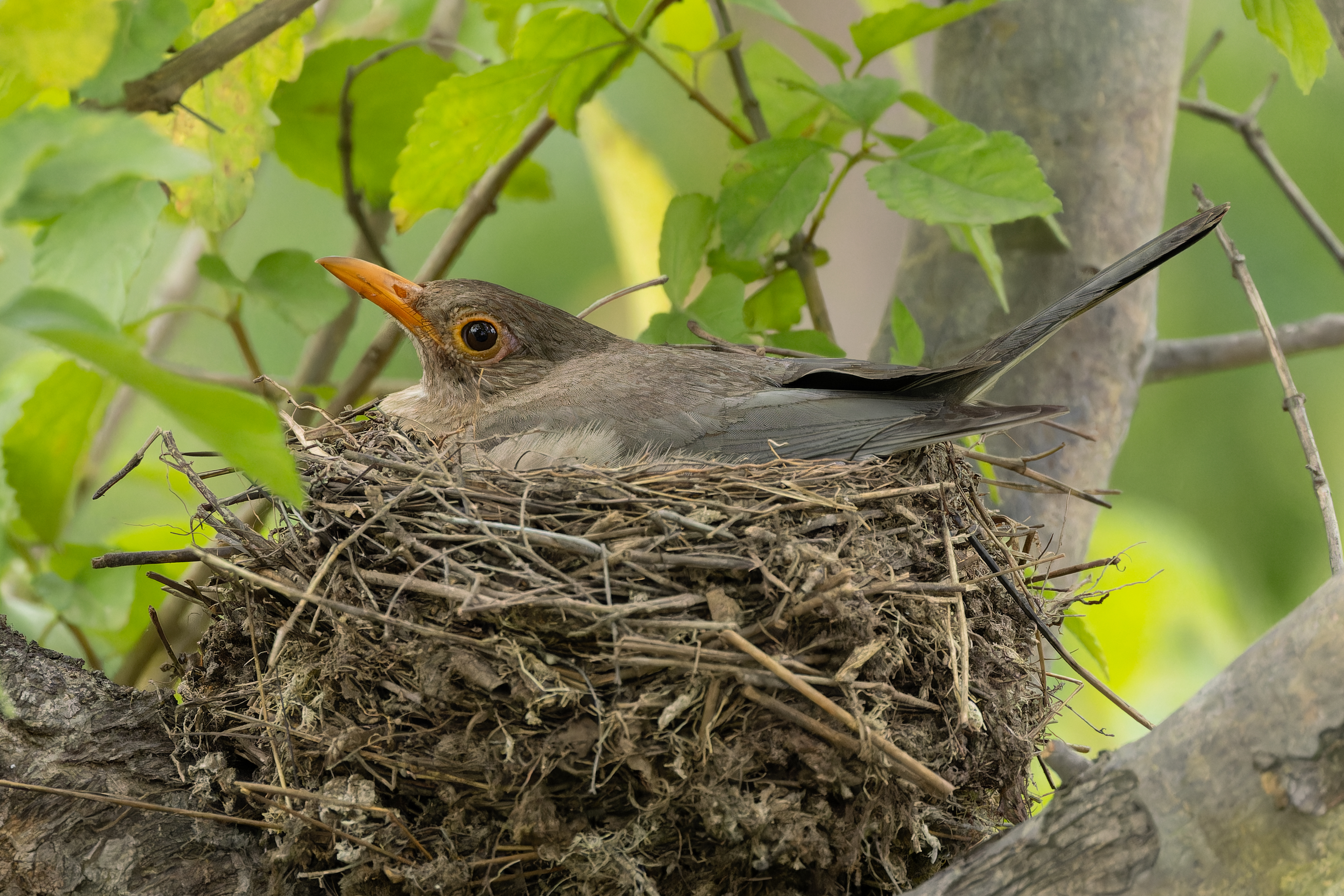
Indian blackbird female, nesting in Saswad, India

The Indian blackbird (Turdus simillimus) is a member of the thrush family Turdidae. It was formerly considered a subspecies of the common blackbird. It is found only in India and Sri Lanka. The subspecies from most of the Indian subcontinent, simillimus, nigropileus, bourdilloni and spencei, are small, only 19–20 centimetres (7.5–7.9 inches) long, and have broad eye-rings. They also differ in proportions, wing formula, egg colour and voice from the common blackbird.

== Subspecies ==
- The Nilgiri blackbird (T. s. simillimus) is resident up to 2,000 metres in the Western Ghats from Biligirirangans and Nilgiris till about Nelliampathies where it integrates with Bourdillon's blackbird.
- The black-capped blackbird (T. s. nigropileus) is resident up to about 1,820 metres (5,970 feet) in the Western Ghats of western India and the northern and central parts of the Western Ghats. Some populations migrate further south in winter. The male is brownish slate-grey with a dark cap, and the female is mid-brown, paler below. It is small with a relatively broad yellow eye-ring.
- Spence's blackbird (T. s. spencei), named for William Spence, British entomologist, is very similar to nigropileus, but has a less distinct cap. It is resident in the Eastern Ghats of India. It is of dubious validity, and is often included in nigropileus with which it is said to integrate in the Nallamala Hills.
- Bourdillon's blackbird (T. s. bourdilloni), named for Thomas Fulton Bourdillon, Conservator of Forests in the then princely state of Travancore, is a common resident of the hills above 900 metres (3,000 feet) in southern Kerala and Tamil Nadu. It resembles simillimus and intergrades with it in the Palni Hills, but the male is uniform slate brown.
- Kinnis' blackbird (T. s. kinnisii), named for John Kinnis, medical superintendent to the British military forces in Ceylon, is endemic to montane forests of Sri Lanka. Main breeding season is known to starts March to April and probably again from August to September as well.
