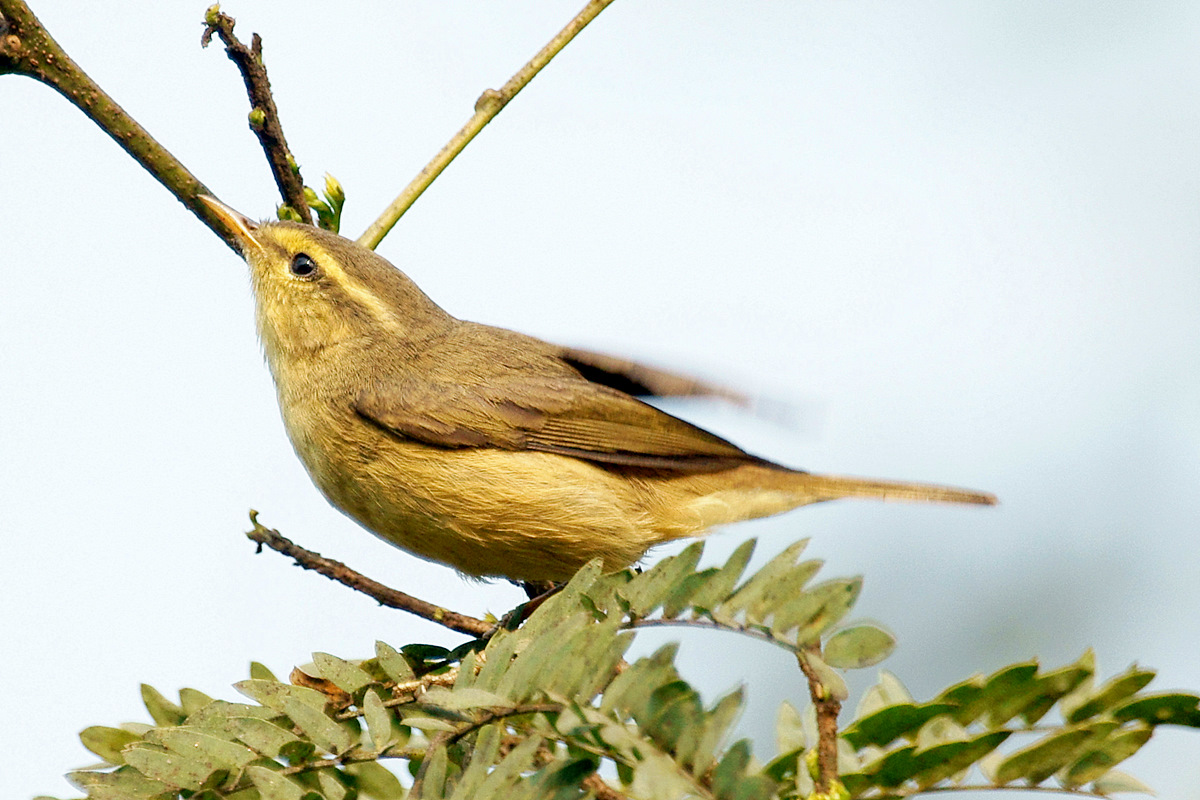

Conservation status
- Least Concern (IUCN 3.1)

Scientific classification
- Kingdom: Animalia
- Phylum: Chordata
- Class: Aves
- Order: Passeriformes
- Family: Phylloscopidae
- Genus: Phylloscopus
- Species: P. affinis

Binomial name
- Phylloscopus affinis (Tickell, 1833)

= Tickell's leaf warbler =

Species of bird

Tickell's leaf warbler (Phylloscopus affinis) is a leaf warbler found in Asia in the countries of Bangladesh, Bhutan, China, India, Myanmar, Nepal, Pakistan and Thailand. The species has a yellowish underside and supercilium. Like other leaf warblers it feeds mostly on insects by gleaning and short sallies. An active bird, it prefers the canopy and low shrubbery and can be difficult to track as it moves actively from branch to branch, acrobatically exploring the underside of leaves and twigs. The clear yellowish undersides and lack of a wing bar can be used to tell it apart from similar species. It has slim dark legs with largely pale lower mandible and grayish wing panel.

== Taxonomy ==
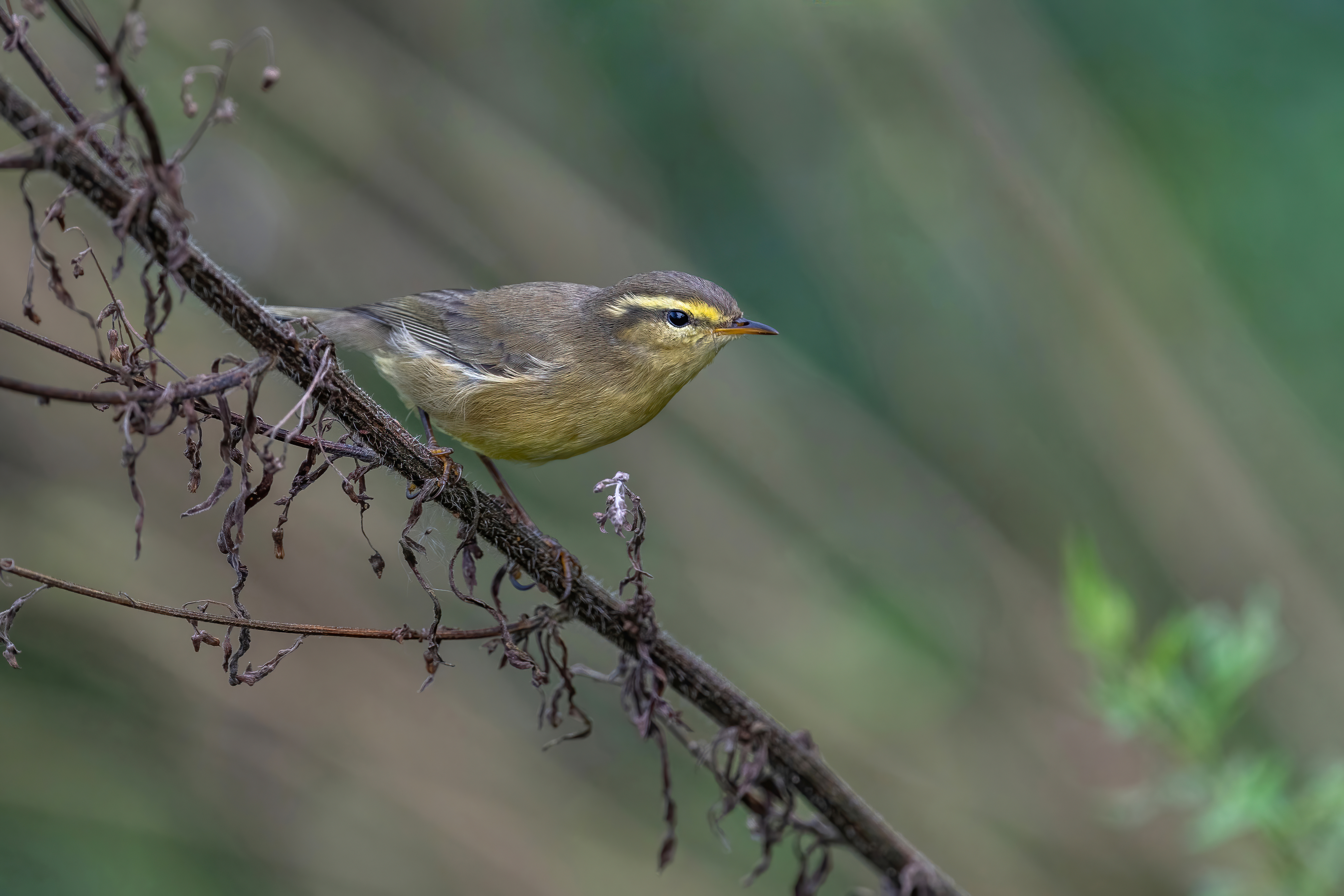
P. a. affinis in Nilbarahi forest Bhaktapur, Nepal.

Tickell's leaf warbler was formally described in 1833 by the English ornithologist Samuel Tickell. He coined the binomial name Motacilla offinis where offinis is an error for affinis. Tickell's leaf warbler is now one of around 80 species placed in the genus Phylloscopus that was introduced by the German zoologist Friedrich Boie in 1826. The genus name combines the Ancient Greek phullon meaning "leaf" and skopos meaning "seeker" (from skopeo, "to watch"). The specific epithet affinis is from Latin meaning "related" or "allied".

Three subspecies are recognised:

- P. a. affinis (Tickell, 1833) – east Himalayas from Nepal to southeast Tibet
- P. a. perflavus Martens, J, Sun & Päckert, 2008 – west Himalayas from Pakistan to north India
- P. a. occisinensis Martens, J, Sun & Päckert, 2008 – west-central China

The subspecies P. a. occisinensis was formerly treated as a separate species, the Alpine leaf warbler. It is now lumped with the Tickell's leaf warbler based on the results of a 2019 study that compared nuclear genomic data for the two taxa.

== Breeding ==
During the months of May to August the Tickell's leaf warbler creates a nest made of dry grasses and plant fibers. The bird breeds among rocks and low bushes in barren mountains.
