= John Kinnis =

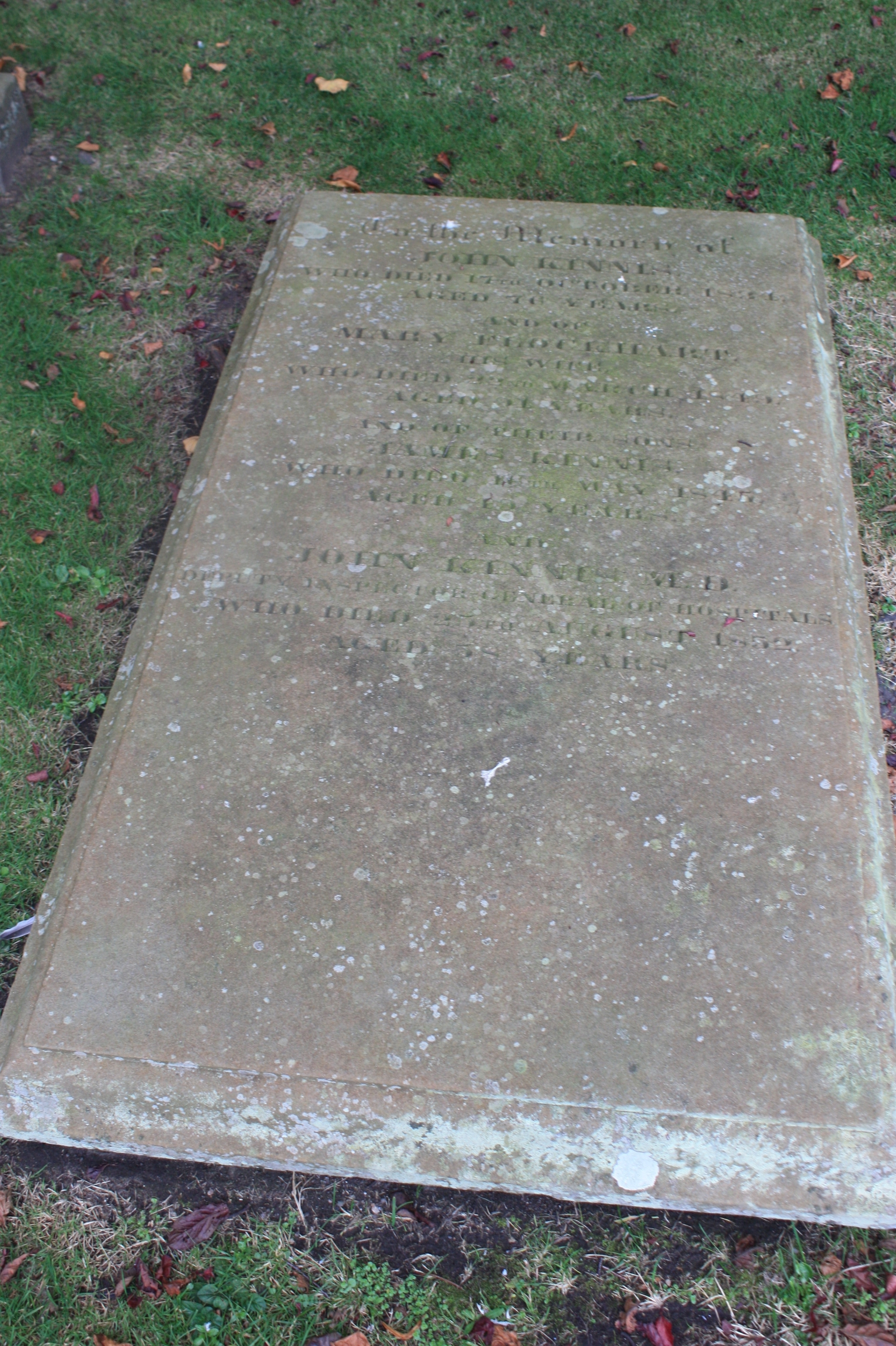
The grave of Dr John Kinnis, Dunfermline Abbey churchyard

Dr John Kinnis (c. 1794- August 1852) was a medical superintendent to the British military forces in Ceylon in the nineteenth century, and wrote several papers for the Edinburgh Medical and Surgical Journal on, for example, elephantiasis, smallpox vaccination and military medical statistics. He retired from medical service in 1851.

He was also an energetic and successful amateur naturalist and was seconded by Robert Templeton of the Royal Artillery to investigate and collect the local flora and fauna.

The Ceylon subspecies of the blackbird, Turdus merula kinnisii, was named for him by English zoologist and chemist Edward Blyth in 1841.

He is buried on the north side of Dunfermline Abbey in Scotland.
