= List of endemic birds of South Asia =

Endemic birds of South Asia are those birds that belong to or are native to South Asia, on the Indian subcontinent and adjacent islands of the north-central Indian Ocean.

This article is one of a series providing information about endemism among birds in the world's various zoogeographic zones. For an overview of this subject see Endemism in birds.

== Endemic Bird Areas ==
BirdLife International has defined two Endemic Bird Areas (EBAs) in the Indian subcontinent:

- Western Ghats, India
- Sri Lanka

Each area has its own set of endemic species, and there are further species shared between the two which are not found elsewhere.

In addition, the following are classified as secondary areas (areas with at least one restricted-range bird species, but not meeting the criteria to qualify as EBAs):

- Eastern Andhra Pradesh - covering the range of the Jerdon's courser, India.
- Southern Deccan Plateau - covering the range of the yellow-throated bulbul, yellow-billed babbler, Sykes's lark, Jerdon's bushlark, crested hawk-eagle, India.
- Central Indian Forests - covering the range of the forest owlet, India.

== List of species ==
=== Species endemic to India ===
==== Species endemic to the Western Ghats and associated hills ====
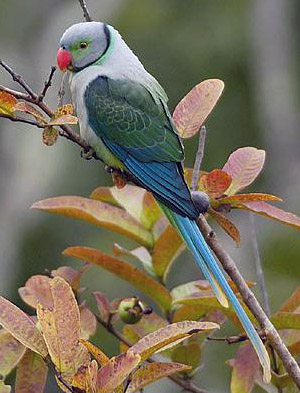
Malabar parakeet

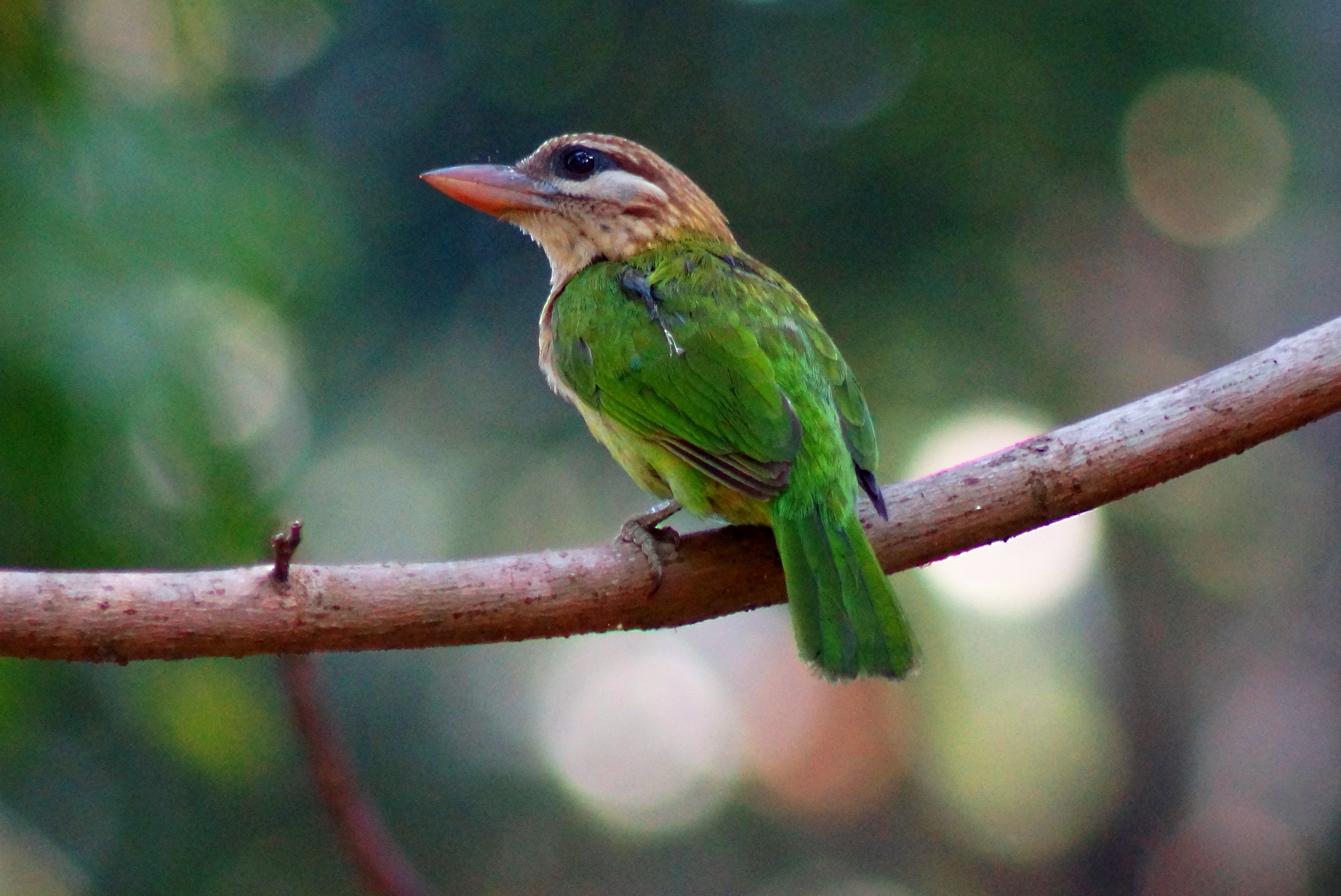
White-cheeked barbet

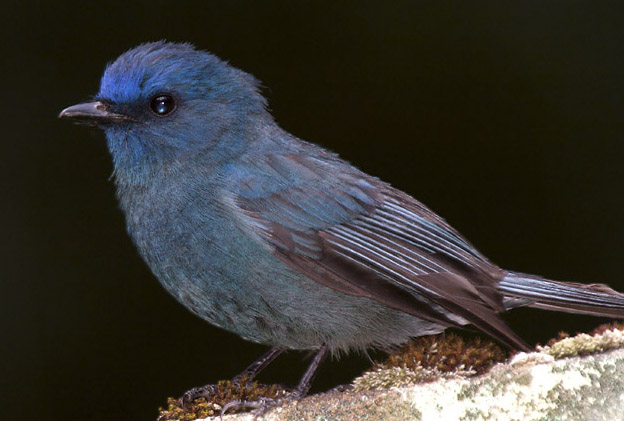
Nilgiri flycatcher

- Nilgiri woodpigeon
- Malabar imperial pigeon
- Malabar parakeet
- Malabar grey hornbill
- Malabar flameback
- Malabar barbet
- Nilgiri flowerpecker
- Crimson-backed sunbird
- Nilgiri pipit
- Malabar lark
- Grey-headed bulbul
- Flame-throated bulbul
- Rufous babbler
- Banasura laughingthrush
- Nilgiri laughingthrush
- Palani laughingthrush
- Ashambu laughingthrush
- Vigors's sunbird
- White-bellied blue flycatcher
- Black-and-orange flycatcher
- Nilgiri flycatcher
- White-bellied blue robin
- Nilgiri blue robin
- Nilgiri thrush
- Broad-tailed grassbird
- Malabar white-headed starling
- Malabar woodshrike (Tephrodornis sylvicola)
- Square-tailed black bulbul (Hypsipetes ganeesa)

==== Other localised species endemic to peninsular India ====
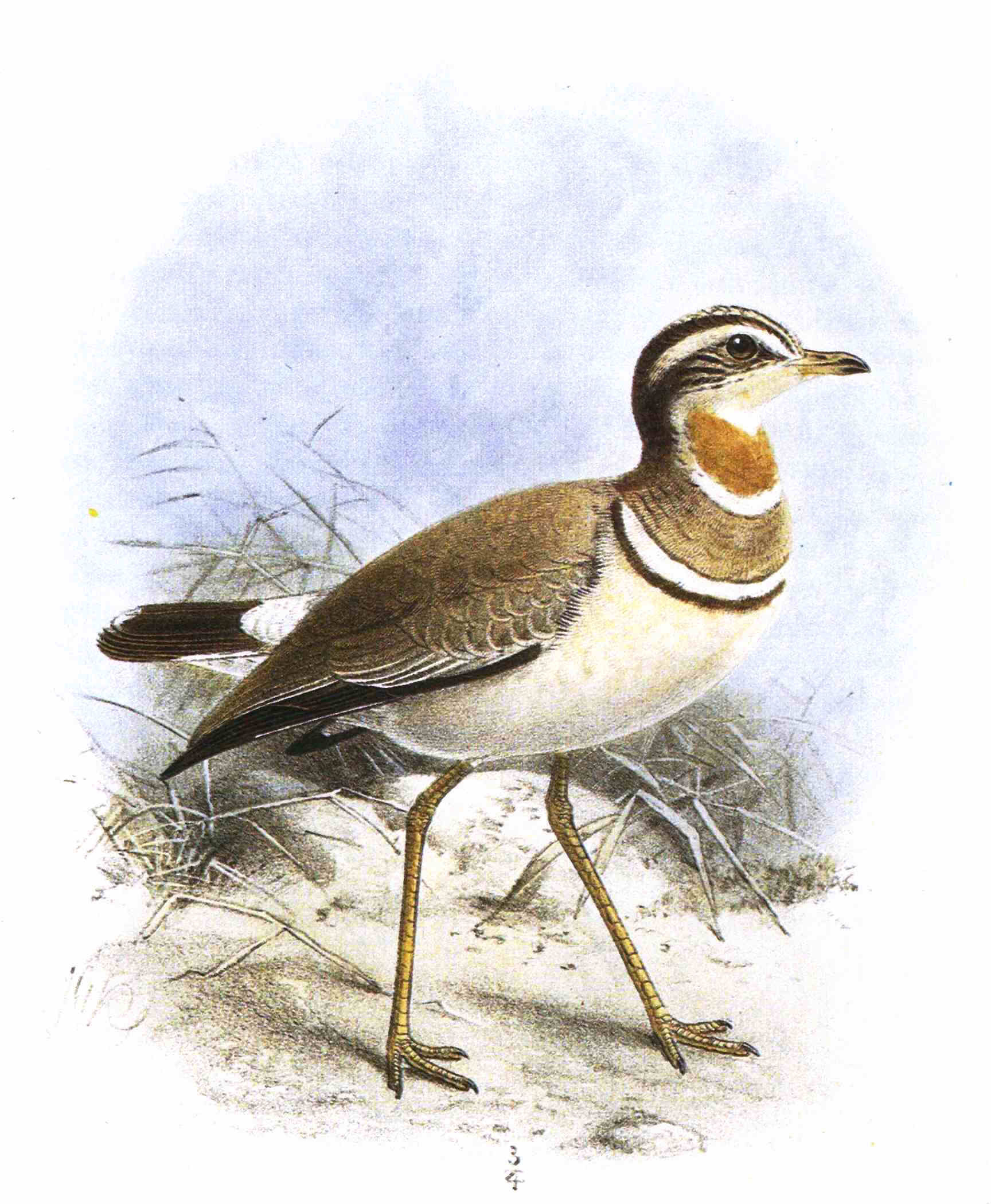
Jerdon's courser

- Grey junglefowl
- Rock bush-quail
- Jerdon's courser
- Forest owlet
- Mottled wood-owl
- Malabar trogon (forests)
- White-cheeked barbet
- White-spotted fantail
- Indian black-lored tit
- Yellow-throated bulbul
- Indian scimitar babbler (forests only)
- Tickell's blue flycatcher
- Malabar whistling-thrush (forests only)
- Sykes's lark
- Green avadavat

=== Species endemic to Sri Lanka ===
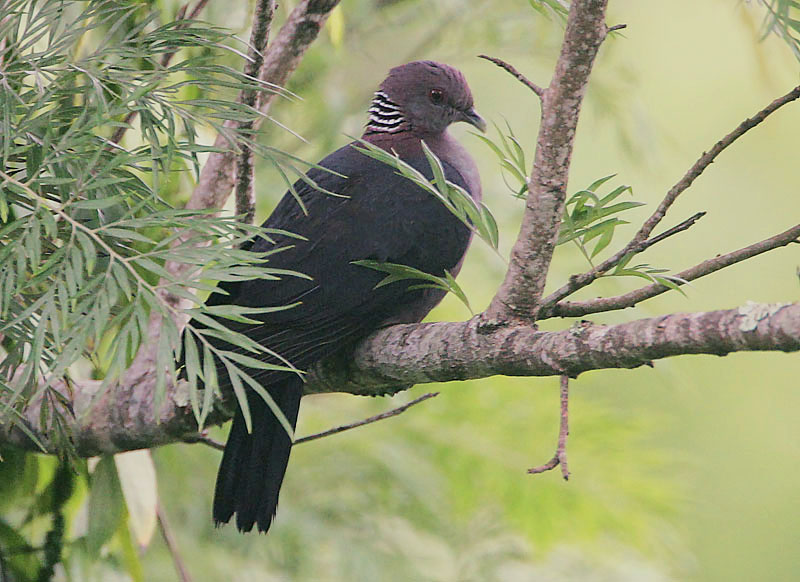
Sri Lanka wood-pigeon

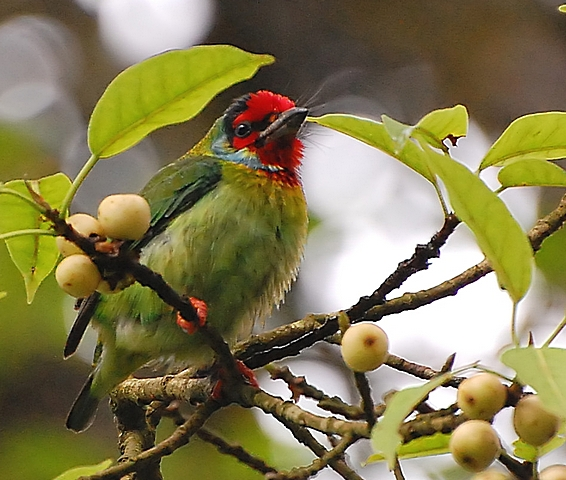
Crimson-fronted barbet

- Sri Lanka spurfowl
- Sri Lanka junglefowl
- Layard's parakeet
- Sri Lanka wood-pigeon
- Sri Lanka hanging parrot
- Green-billed coucal
- Red-faced malkoha
- Sri Lanka grey hornbill
- Black-crested bulbul
- Yellow-eared bulbul
- Yellow-fronted barbet
- Crimson-fronted barbet
- White-throated flowerpecker
- Sri Lanka white-eye
- Sri Lanka blue magpie
- Sri Lanka whistling thrush
- Spot-winged thrush
- Sri Lanka scaly thrush (Zoothera dauma imbricata)
- Ashy-headed laughingthrush
- White-faced starling
- Brown-capped babbler
- Orange-billed babbler
- Sri Lanka scimitar babbler (Pomatorhinus melanurus)
- Sri Lanka bush warbler
- Dull-blue flycatcher
- Sri Lanka myna
- Serendib scops-owl
- Chestnut-backed owlet

==== Other localised species endemic to peninsular India and Sri Lanka combined ====
- Blue-faced malkoha
- Sirkeer malkoha
- Common hawk-cuckoo
- Yellow-wattled lapwing
- Indian scops-owl
- Jungle owlet
- Malabar pied hornbill
- Brown-capped pygmy woodpecker
- Yellow-crowned woodpecker
- Black-rumped flameback
- Plum-headed parakeet
- Jungle nightjar
- Jerdon's nightjar
- Malabar trogon
- Malabar pied hornbill
- Bay-backed shrike
- White-bellied drongo
- White-bellied treepie
- Indian jungle crow
- Legge's hawk-eagle
- Yellow-billed babbler
- Black-throated munia

==== Species endemic to Sri Lanka and the Western Ghats combined ====
- Sri Lanka bay owl (Phodilus assimilis)
- Sri Lanka frogmouth
- Indian swiftlet

=== Other species endemic to the subcontinent ===
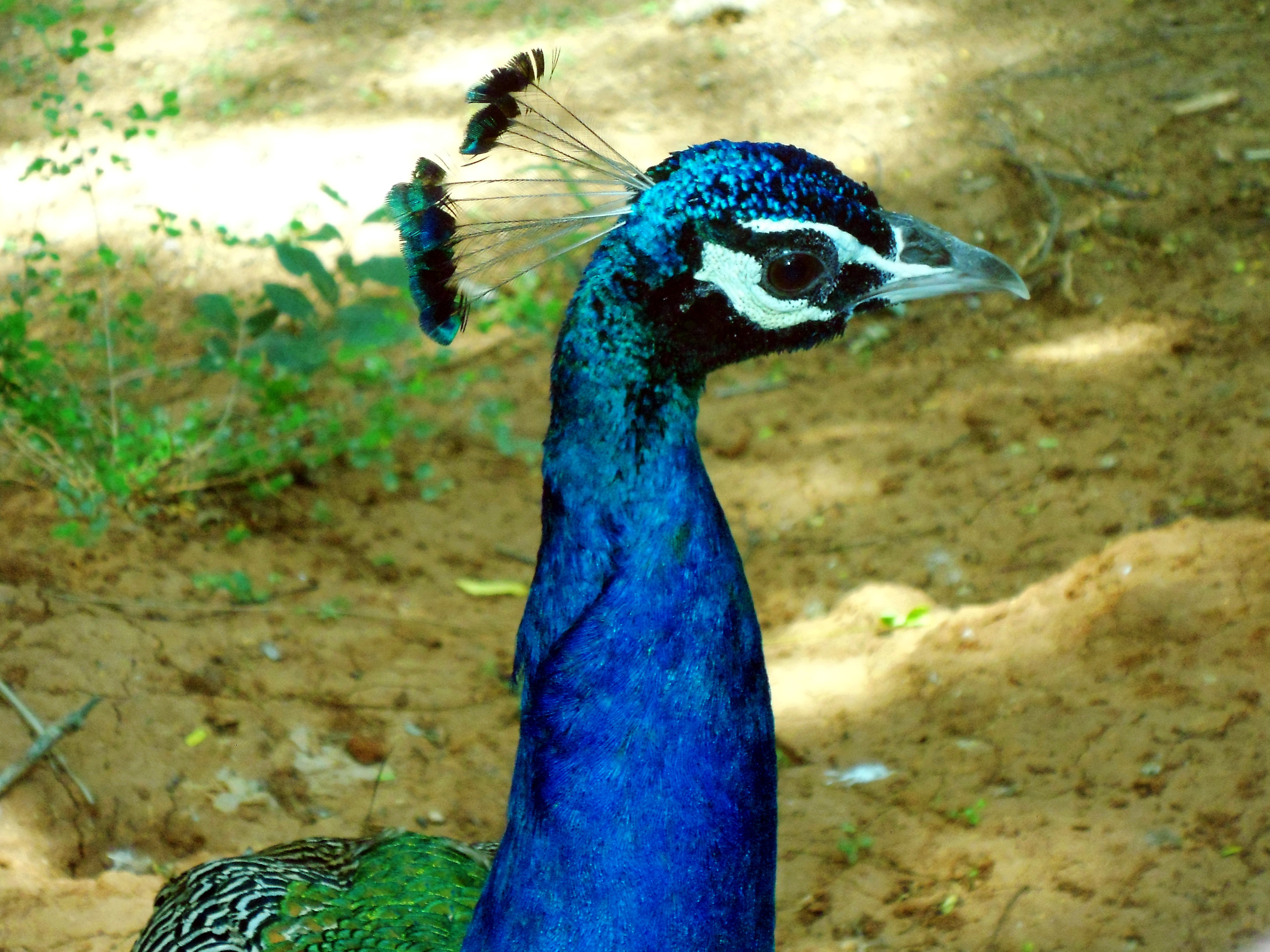
Indian peafowl

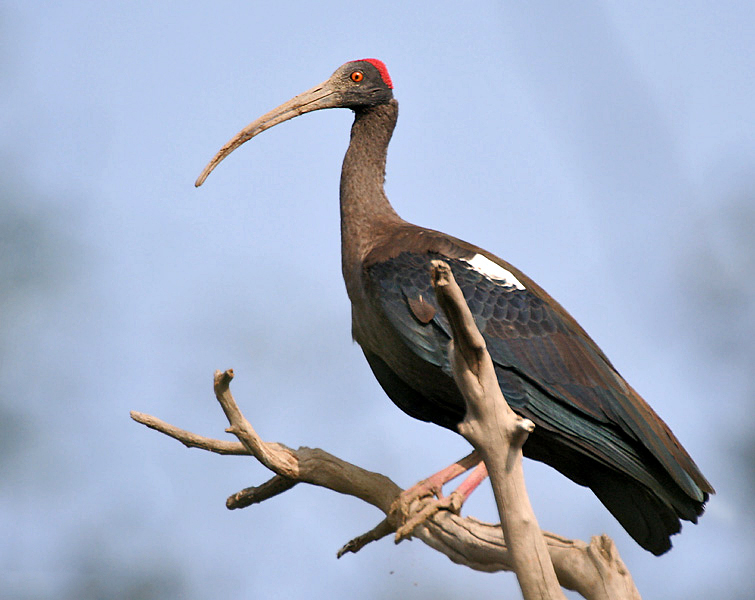
Indian black ibis

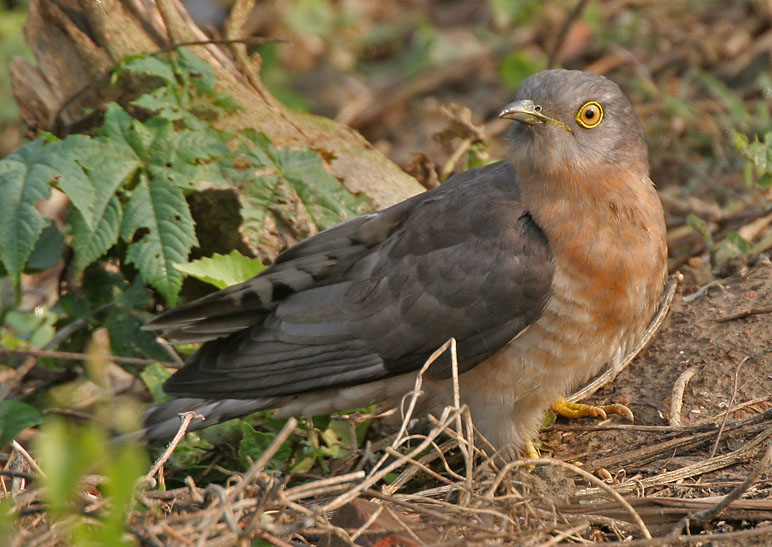
Common hawk-cuckoo

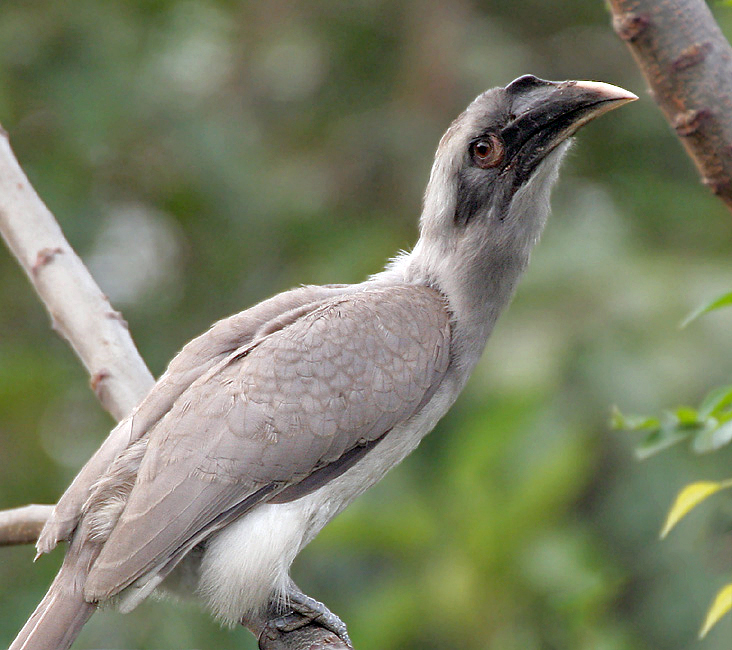
Indian grey hornbill

- Painted francolin
- Painted bush-quail
- Red spurfowl
- Painted spurfowl
- Indian peafowl
- Indian black ibis
- Crested hawk-eagle
- Indian vulture
- Lesser florican
- Great Indian bustard
- Indian courser
- Yellow-wattled lapwing
- Painted sandgrouse
- Plum-headed parakeet
- Grey-bellied cuckoo
- Common hawk-cuckoo
- Sirkeer malkoha
- Indian eagle-owl
- Mottled wood-owl
- Indian scops-owl
- Indian jungle nightjar
- Indian white-rumped spinetail
- Indian grey hornbill
- Brown-headed barbet
- Brown-capped pygmy woodpecker
- Black-rumped flameback
- White-naped flameback
- Indian pitta
- Indian bushlark
- Jerdon's bushlark
- Bengal bushlark
- Ashy-crowned finch-lark
- Rufous-tailed lark
- Sykes's lark
- Red-rumped swallow (Hirundo daurica hyperythra)
- White-browed wagtail
- Black-headed cuckoo-shrike
- White-bellied minivet
- Orange minivet
- Malabar woodshrike (Tephrodornis gularis sylvicola)
- Sri Lanka woodshrike (Tephrodornis pondicerianus affinis)
- White-spotted fantail (Rhipidura albicollis albogularis)
- Purple-rumped sunbird

==== Species endemic to northern parts of the subcontinent ====
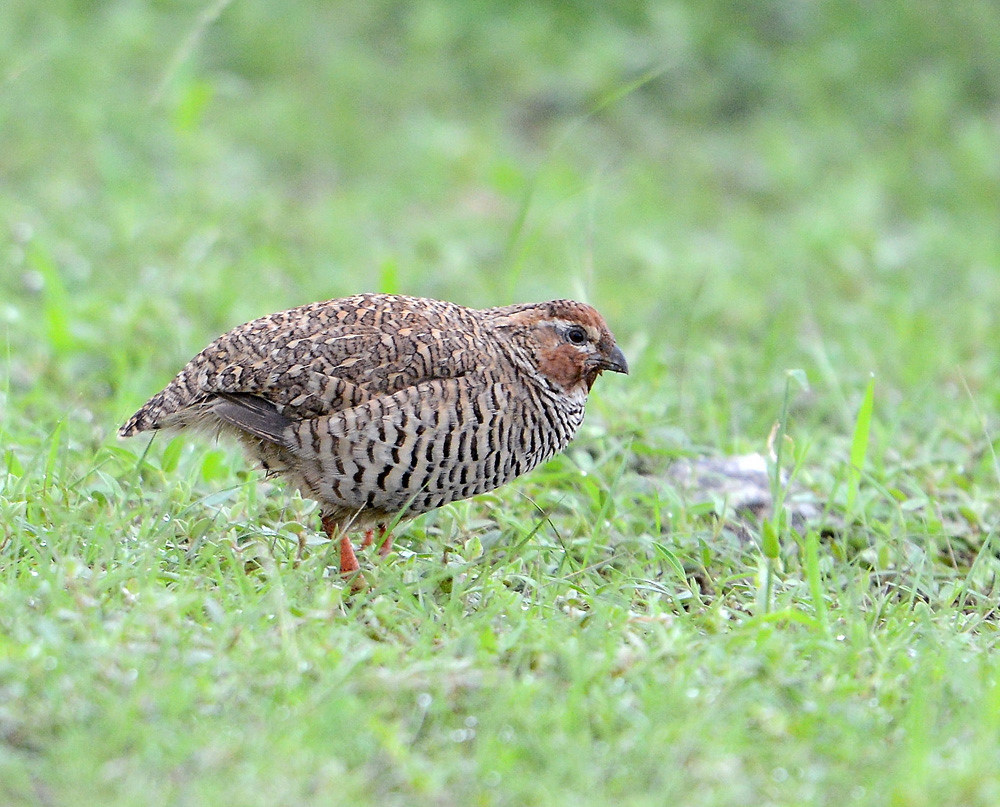
Rock bush-quail

- Swamp francolin
- Chestnut-breasted hill-partridge
- Himalayan quail
- Manipur bush-quail
- Bugun liocichla
- Jungle bush-quail
- Rock bush-quail
- Western tragopan
- Cheer pheasant
- Himalayan parakeet
- Brown-fronted woodpecker
- Himalayan woodpecker
- Himalayan black-lored tit (Machlolophus xanthogenys)

==== Near-endemics and seasonal endemics ====
In addition, the following species are near-endemics i.e. only a small proportion of the population is found outside the subcontinent:

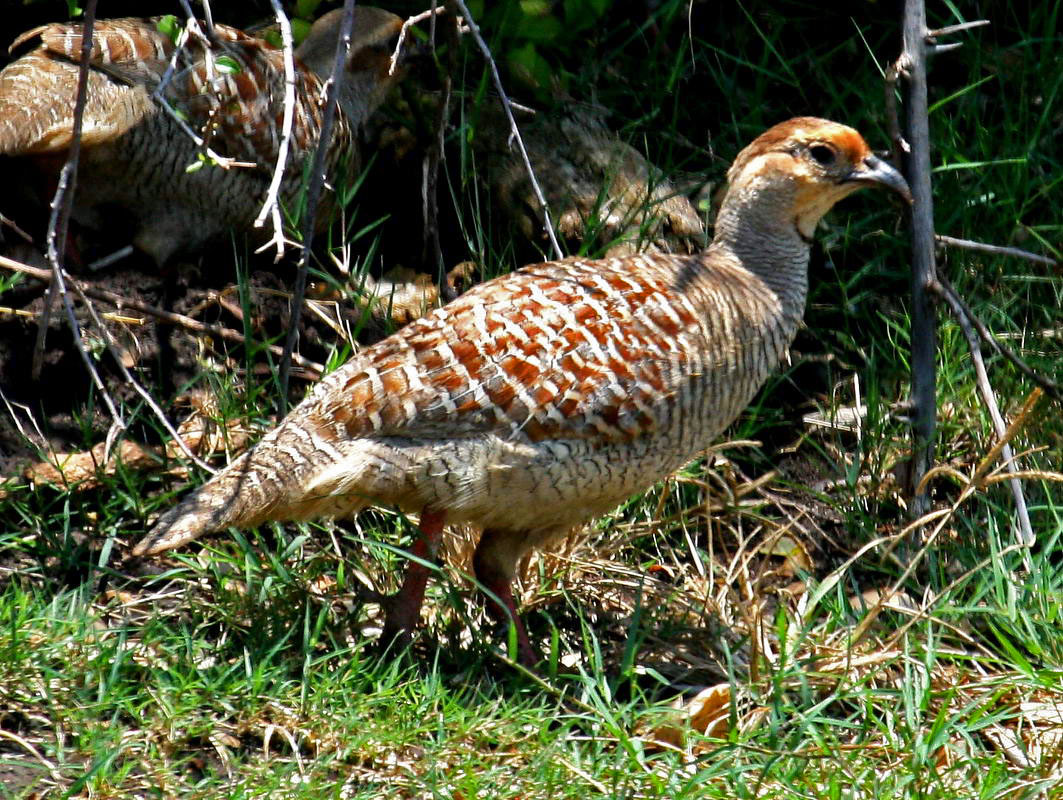
Grey francolin

- Pink-headed duck
- Grey francolin
- Satyr tragopan
- Himalayan monal
- White-bellied heron
- Indian spotted eagle
- Laggar falcon
- Yellow-rumped honeyguide
- Fulvous-breasted woodpecker
- Sind woodpecker
- Scaly-bellied woodpecker

The following species is endemic as a breeding species, but winters elsewhere:

- Dark-rumped swift

== See also ==
- Birds of South Asia
- Lists of birds of Asia
- Lists of birds of India
- Endemic Birds of the Andaman and Nicobar Islands — territory of India in southeast Asia.
