= Fairbank =

Fairbank may refer to:

== People ==
- Fairbank (surname)

== Places ==
- 67235 Fairbank, asteroid

United States

- Fairbank, Arizona
- Fairbank, Iowa
- Fairbank Township, Buchanan County, Iowa
- Fairbank Island (Michigan)

Canada

- Fairbank, Newfoundland and Labrador
- Fairbank, Toronto, Ontario - a neighbourhood in Toronto in which the following are located:
  - Fairbank Memorial Park
  - Fairbank Middle School
  - Fairbank station - an underground light-rail station on Line 5 Eglinton
- Fairbank Island (Fairbank Lake), Northern Ontario
- Fairbank Lake, Northern Ontario

== Other uses ==
- Fairbank's disease, or multiple epiphyseal dysplasia, a genetic disorder

== See also ==
- Fairbanks, Alaska
- Fairbanks (disambiguation)
