= Fairbanks (disambiguation) =

Fairbanks is a city in Alaska.

Fairbanks may also refer to:

== Places in the United States ==
- Fairbanks, Florida
- Fairbanks, Indiana
- Fairbanks, Louisiana
- Fairbanks, a village in Farmington, Maine
- Fairbanks, Minnesota
- Fairbanks, Oregon
- Fairbanks, Houston, Texas
- Fairbanks, Wisconsin
- Fairbanks North Star Borough, Alaska
- Fairbanks Ranch, California
- Fairbanks Township (disambiguation)

== Other uses ==
- Fairbanks (surname)
- Fairbanks disease, a genetic disorder affecting bone growth, also known as multiple epiphyseal dysplasia
- Fairbanks House (Dedham, Massachusetts) (built in 1637), the oldest wood-frame house in the U.S.
- Fairbanks station (disambiguation), several stations with the name

== See also ==
- Fairbank (disambiguation)
