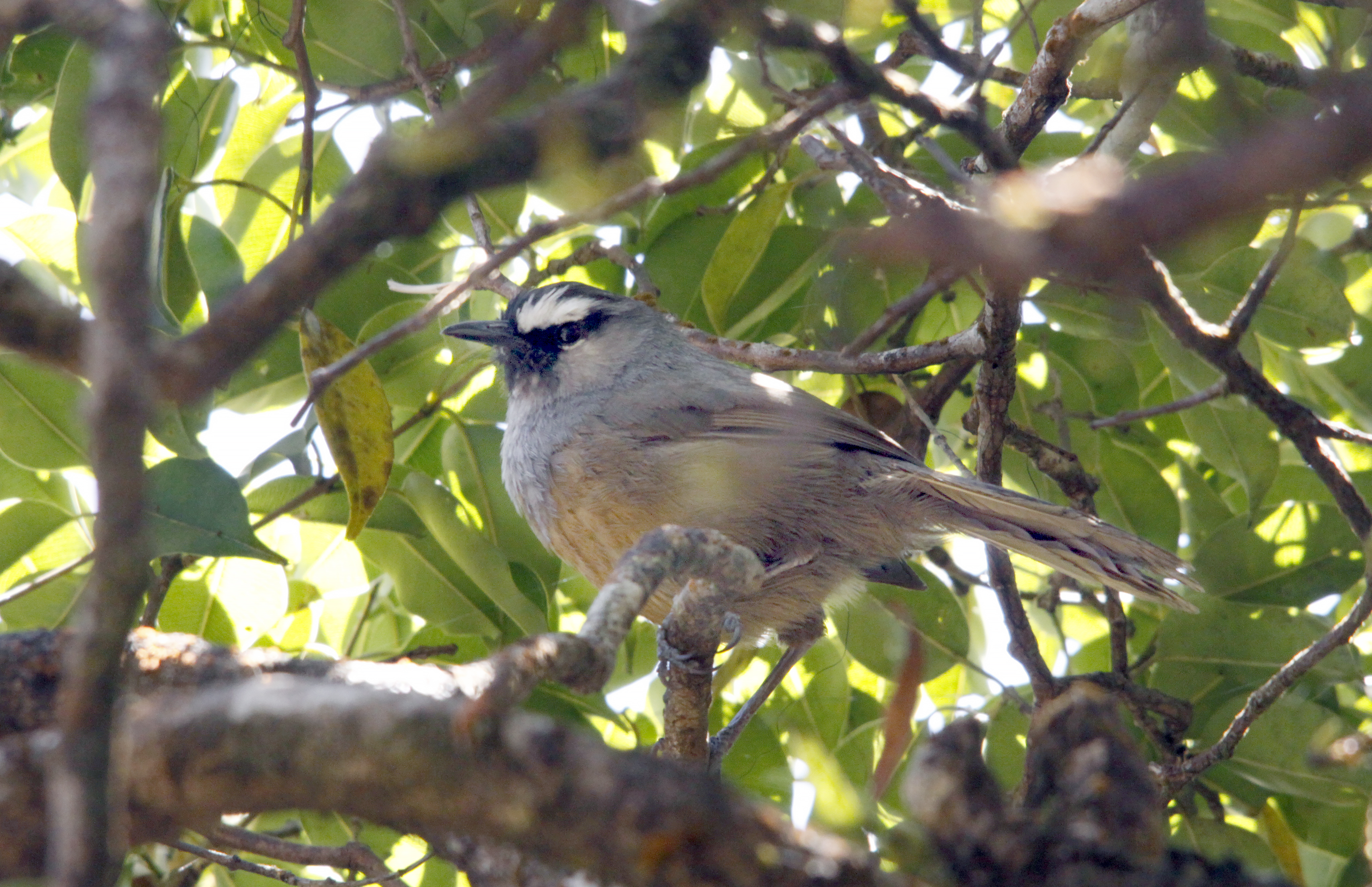

Conservation status
- Endangered (IUCN 3.1)

Scientific classification
- Kingdom: Animalia
- Phylum: Chordata
- Class: Aves
- Order: Passeriformes
- Family: Leiothrichidae
- Genus: Montecincla
- Species: M. jerdoni

Binomial name
- Montecincla jerdoni (Blyth, 1851)
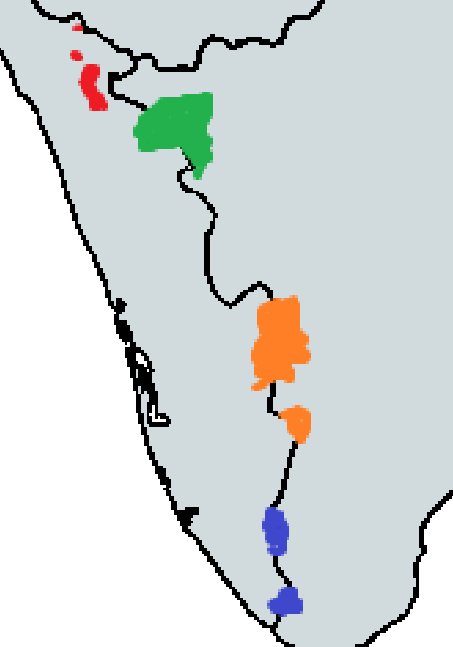
- Banasura laughingthrush (the other colours show the ranges of the other species in the genus)

Synonyms
- Montecincla cachinnans jerdoni

= Banasura laughingthrush =

Species of bird

The Banasura laughingthrush or Banasura chilappan (Montecincla jerdoni) is a species of bird in the family Leiothrichidae. It is found in shola habitat in a small section of the Western Ghats in southwestern Karnataka and northern Kerala, India. It was formerly considered a subspecies of the black-chinned laughingthrush.

== Taxonomy ==
The Banasura laughingthrush was described by zoologist Edward Blyth in 1851, based on a type specimen collected at Banasura Hill in modern-day Kerala by Thomas Jerdon. Blyth originally placed it in the genus Garrulax. After a period of taxonomic reorganisation, the species, along with the Palani laughingthrush and the Ashambu laughingthrush, were placed in the genus Montecincla, in which it remains.

The Banasura laughingthrush was formerly treated as conspecific with the Nilgiri laughingthrush, with the two together known as black-chinned laughingthrush. However, phylogenetic analysis revealed that the Banasura and Nilgiri laughingthrushes were better treated as different populations that had diverged through allopatric speciation, and the Banasura laughingthrush was raised to full species status in 2015.

The Banasura laughingthrush is genetically closely related to the Nilgiri laughingthrush, and the two species are estimated to have diverged about 330,000 years before the present.

== Description ==
The Banasura laughingthrush is a medium-sized songbird, ranging between 20–23 cm long, and between 36–52 g weight. Adults have a black face and throat; white supercilia; a grey breast, cheeks, and back; an ochre belly; and olive back, wings, and tail. Additionally, adults have a black bill, crimson irises, and brownish legs. It is distinguished from the Nilgiri laughingthrush by its grey breast, and from the Palani and Ashambu laughingthrushes by its black chin. The sexes are indistinguishable in plumage.

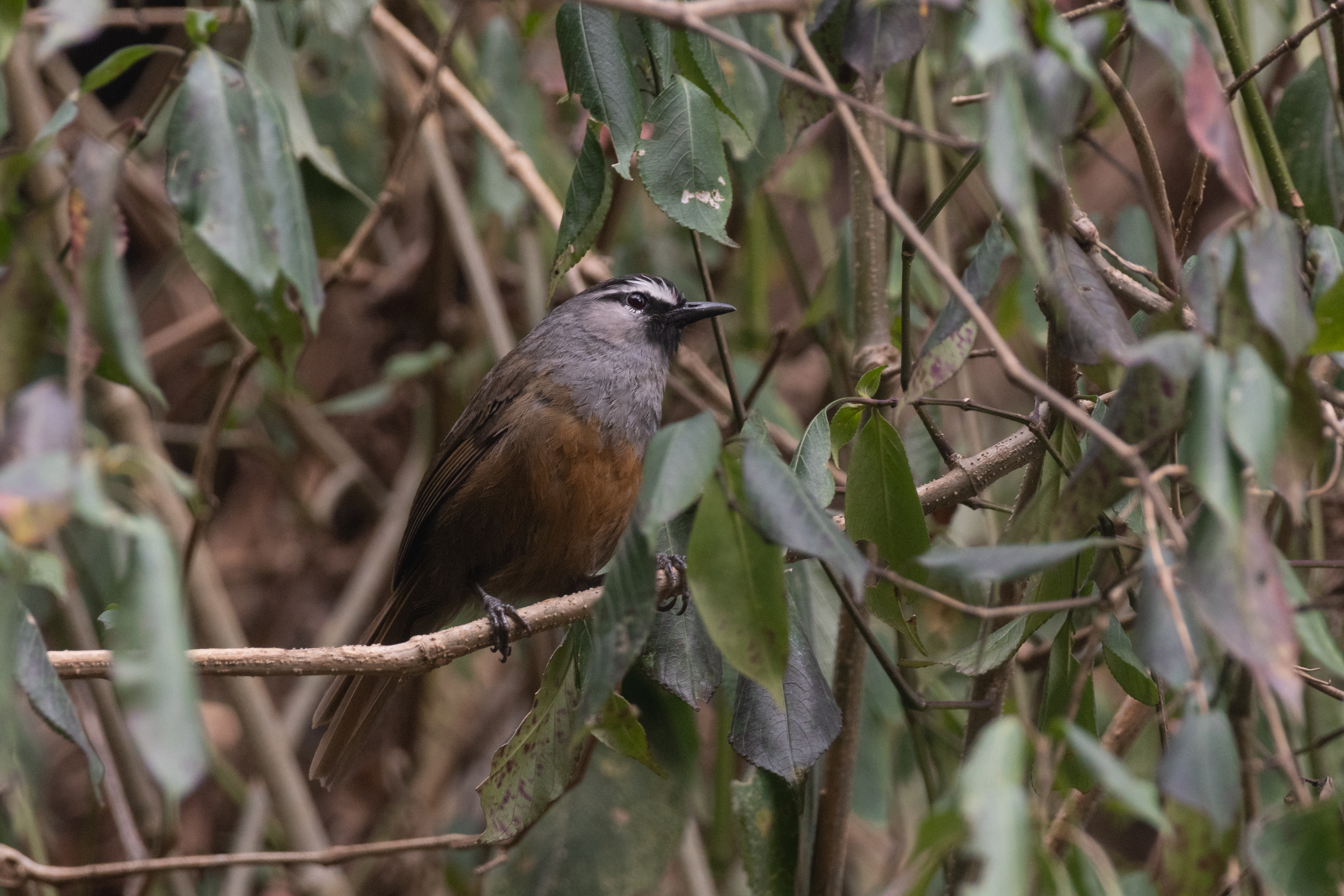
A Banasura laughingthrush in Chembra, Kerala

While the Banasura laughingthrush is extremely similar in appearance to other species within Montecincla, it is the only species in the genus found within its range, making identification straightforward.

== Distribution and habitat ==
The Banasura laughingthrush has an extremely restricted range. It is endemic to a small series of sky islands in the Western Ghats in South India, between the Brahmagiri Hills of Kodagu in the north and Vavul Mala in Kerala in the south. Within this range, fragmented populations are found at Banasura Hill in Wayanad, Chembra Peak, and Vellarimala.

The Banasura laughingthrush is primarily found in shola habitat between 1,400 and 2,400 metres altitude.

== Behaviour and ecology ==
The Banasura laughingthrush forages in the shola midstory and lower canopy by hopping among branches, feeding primarily on fruit and insects. Individual birds are fairly sedentary, and do not regularly travel between sholas.

Like other Montecincla laughingthrushes, the Banasura laughingthrush is highly vocal. The most typical song type is a series of 3 to 6 loud, nasally whistles, but this song is highly variable, with various 2, 3, 4, and 6-note songs being well documented. While the Banasura laughingthrush's song cannot always be distinguished from that of the Nilgiri laughingthrush, analyses have shown the Banasura laughingthrush's song to be generally higher in complexity than any of the other Montecincla laughingthrushes.

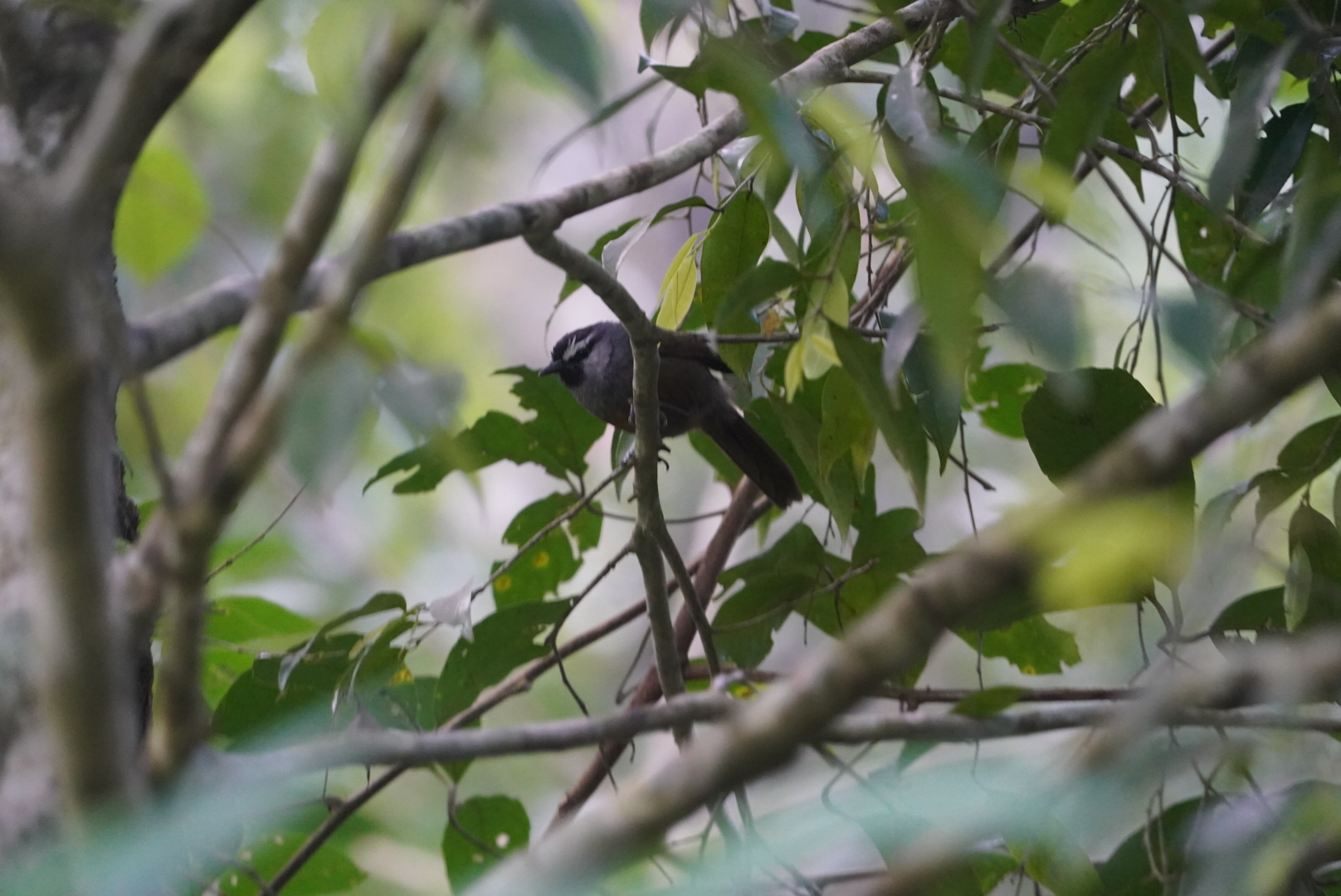
A Banasura laughingthrush in Meppadi, Kerala

== Conservation ==
Due to its extremely small range of under 57 km², the population of the Banasura laughingthrush is estimated at only around 500-2,500 adults. The Banasura laughingthrush's range is also highly fragmented, rendering the species even more vulnerable to declines due to habitat loss and degradation. Due to its small population size and range, the species is ranked by the IUCN as Endangered.

The Camel Hump Mountains Important Bird Area was designated specifically to protect crucial habitat for the Banasura laughingthrush.
