= Wildlife of Tamil Nadu =

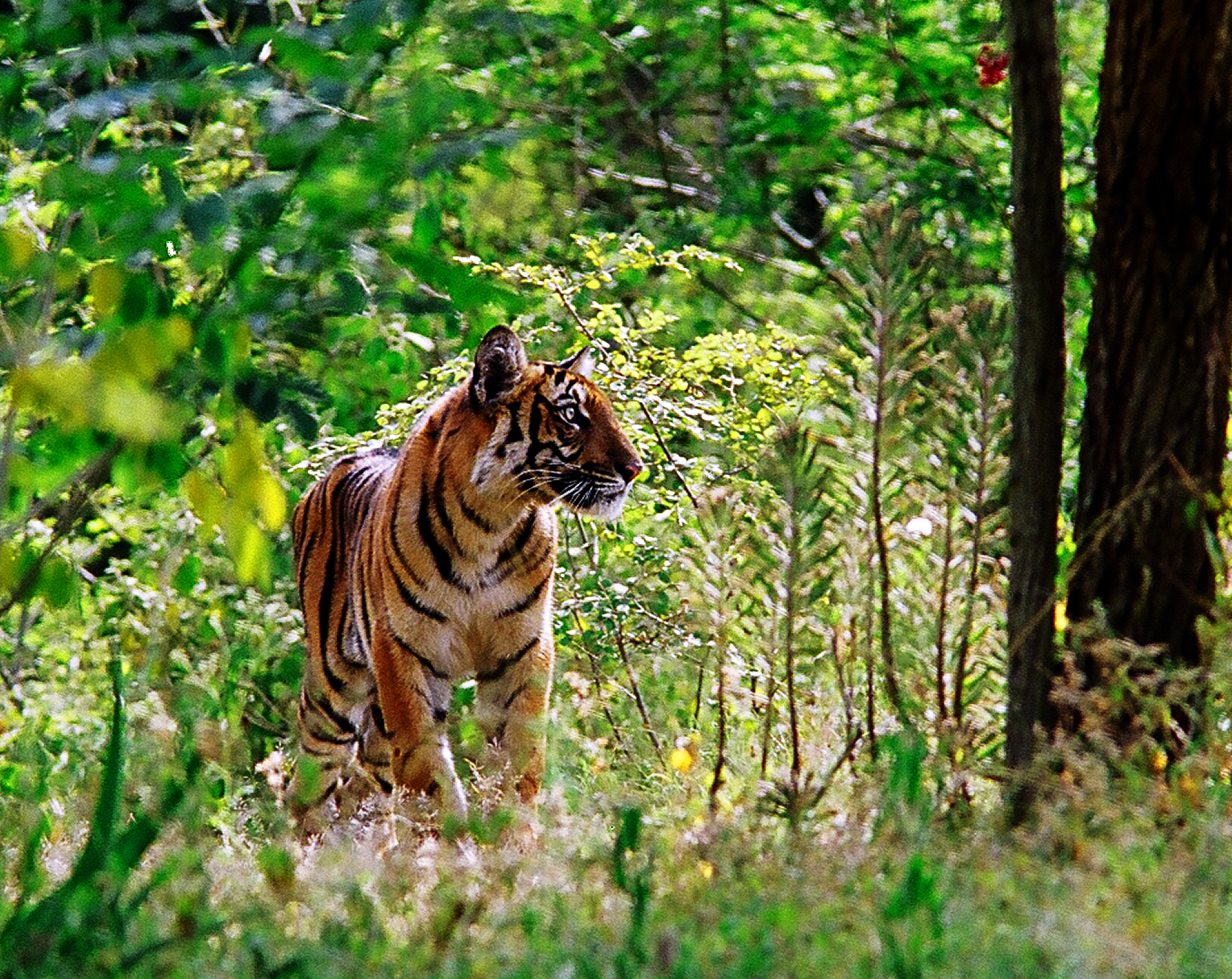
Tiger in Mudumalai National Park

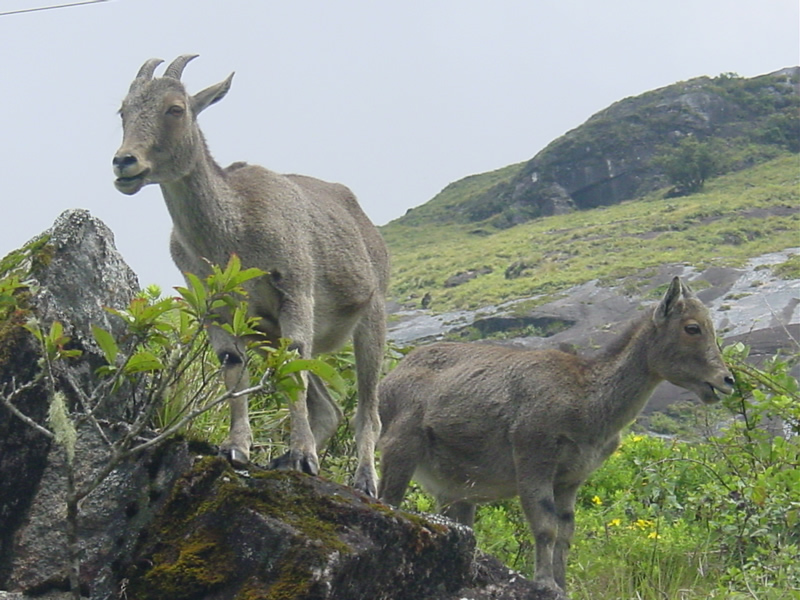
Endangered Nilgiri tahr, state animal of Tamil Nadu

There are more than 2000 species of fauna in Tamil Nadu. This rich wildlife is attributed to the diverse relief features as well as favorable climate and vegetation in the Indian state. Recognizing the state's role in preserving the current environment, the state government has established several wildlife and bird sanctuaries as well as national parks, which entail stringent protective measures. Tamil Nadu is also included in the International Network of Biosphere Reserves, which facilitates international recognition and additional funding. There are five national parks and 17 wildlife sanctuaries that serve as homes to the wildlife.

== Mammals ==
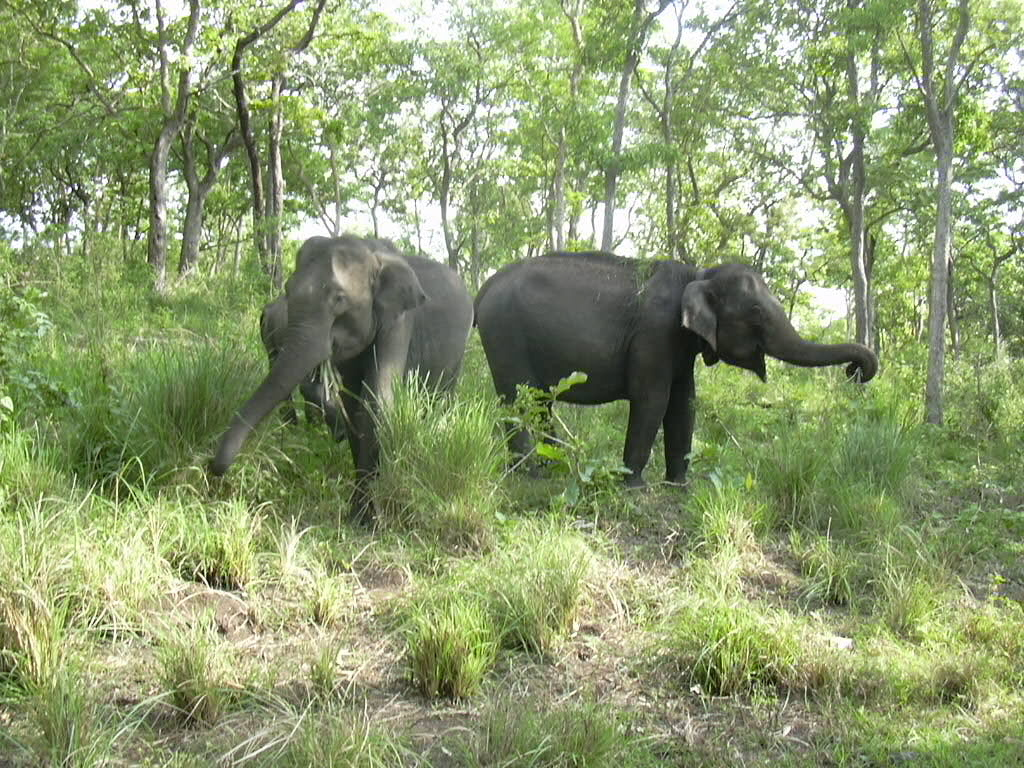
Indian elephant in Masinagudi

Tamil Nadu is known for the diversity of its mammals due to the varying environments that sustain both dry and moist deciduous forests. Notable species include arboreal animals distributed in its hills, grasslands, mangroves, scrubs and forests. These also include vulnerable species like the Bengal tiger, Nilgiri tahr, and the lion-tailed macaque. Other mammals found in Tamil Nadu include:

- Asian elephant
- Indian leopard
- sloth bear
- gaur
- wild boar
- lion-tailed macaque
- Nilgiri langur
- grey langur
- bonnet macaque
- four-horned antelope
- dhole
- honey badger
- tree shrew
- sambar deer
- mouse deer
- Indian muntjac
- jungle cat
- leopard cat
- small Indian civet
- Asian palm civet
- small Indian mongoose
- blackbuck
- chital
- Nilgiri marten
- Travancore flying squirrel
- grizzled giant squirrel
- Indian giant flying squirrel
- Indian palm squirrel
- black-naped hare
- grey slender loris
- Indian pangolin
- Malabar spiny dormouse
- Bengal fox
- smooth-coated otter
- Asian small-clawed otter
- bare-bellied hedgehog
- Indian crested porcupine

== Birds ==
Endangered Nilgiri laughing thrush

Birds found in Tamil Nadu include:

- Malabar trogon
- Malabar pied hornbill
- Nilgiri wood-pigeon
- Nilgiri laughing thrush
- peregrine falcon
- Bonelli's eagle
- dollarbird
- Nilgiri pipit
- little spiderhunter
- white-bellied shortwing
- little ringed plover
- Indian swiftlet
- white-bellied treepie
- white-bellied woodpecker
- green imperial pigeon
- Nilgiri flycatcher
- great eared nightjar
- grey junglefowl
- heart-spotted woodpecker
- peafowl
- grey-fronted green pigeon
- wood sandpiper
- vernal hanging parrot
- Malabar parakeet
- white-browed bulbul
- stork-billed kingfisher
- grey-headed fish-eagle
- brown-capped pygmy woodpecker
- black-and-orange flycatcher
- brown-headed barbet
- blue-bearded bee-eater
- broad-tailed grassbird
- cormorant
- darter
- heron
- egret
- open-billed stork
- spoonbill
- white ibis
- little grebe
- Indian moorhen
- black-winged stilt

There are also a few migratory ducks and occasionally a grey pelican.

== Marine species ==
Marine species include the dugong, turtle, dolphin and Balanoglossus.

== Insects ==
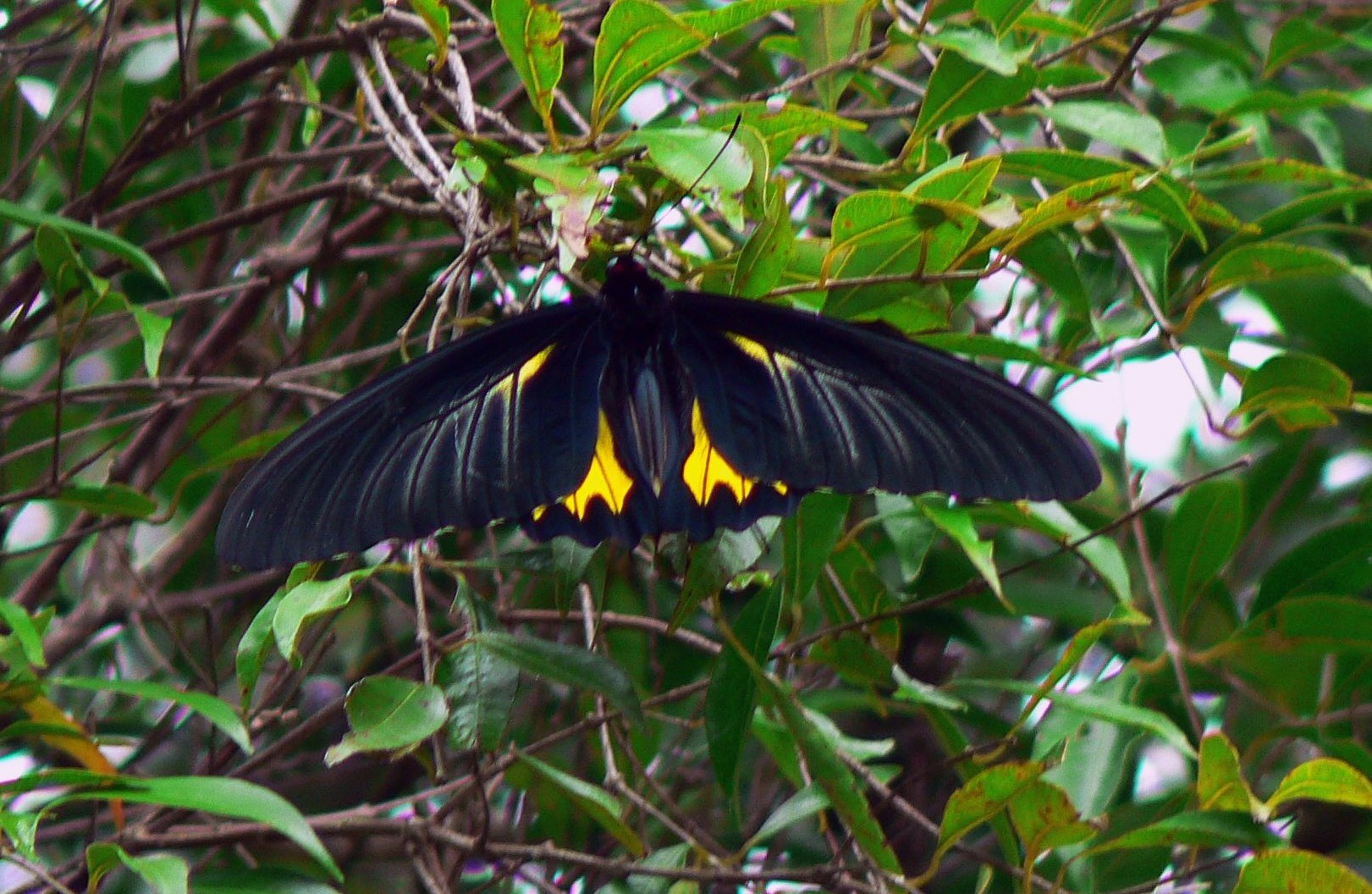
Southern birdwing the largest butterfly in South India

Butterfly species found in Tamil Nadu include:

- southern birdwing
- common rose
- crimson rose
- common bluebottle
- common jay
- tailed jay
- spot swordtail
- five-bar swordtail
- common mime
- Malabar banded swallowtail
- Malabar raven
- red Helen
- common Mormon
- blue Mormon
- Paris peacock
- Malabar banded peacock
- common banded peacock
- common emigrant
- mottled emigrant
- small grass yellow
- common grass yellow
- common Jezebel
- Psyche butterfly
- common gull
- lesser gull
- caper white
- plain puffin
- chocolate albatross
- common albatross
- lesser albatross
- small orange tip
- white orange tip
- yellow orange tip
- common wanderer
- great orange tip
- tawny coaster

== Reptiles ==
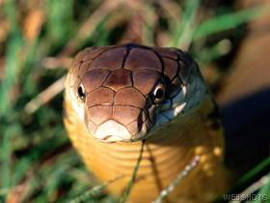
King cobra

Reptilian species found in Tamil Nadu include:

- mugger crocodile
- king cobra
- bamboo pit viper
- Indian cobra
- Indian python
- Travancore tortoise
- spectacled cobra
- common krait
- common green whip snake
- Russell's kukri
- common Indian monitor
- Indian chameleon
- oriental garden lizard
- South Indian flying lizard
- olive ridley turtle
- Cochin forest cane turtle
- Indian black turtle
- Russell's viper
- saltwater crocodile

There are also various species of skinks and geckos.

== Amphibians ==
Amphibian species include:

- large wrinkled frog
- Malabar black narrow mouthed frog
- Kerala warty frog
- pigmy wrinkled frog
- burrowing frog
