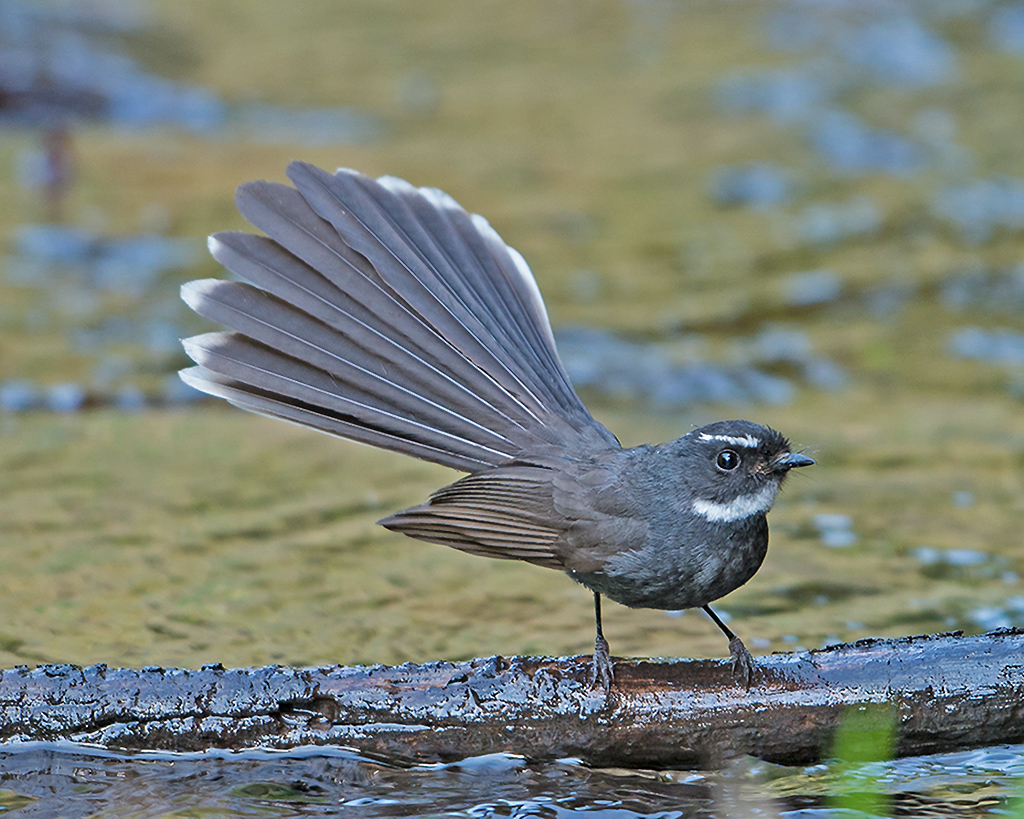
- In Uttarakhand, India

Conservation status
- Least Concern (IUCN 3.1)

Scientific classification
- Kingdom: Animalia
- Phylum: Chordata
- Class: Aves
- Order: Passeriformes
- Family: Rhipiduridae
- Genus: Rhipidura
- Species: R. albicollis

Binomial name
- Rhipidura albicollis (Vieillot, 1818)

= White-throated fantail =

Species of bird

The white-throated fantail (Rhipidura albicollis) is a small passerine bird. It is found in forest, scrub and cultivation across tropical southern Asia from the Himalayas, India and Bangladesh east to Indonesia. The white-spotted fantail (R. albogularis) until recently was considered a subspecies.

== Description ==
The adult white-throated fantail is about 19 cm (7.5 in) long. It has a dark fan-shaped tail, edged in white, and white supercilium and throat. There is otherwise much variation in plumage between races. Most resemble the Himalayan R. a. canescans, which is primarily slate grey above and below, featuring a black eye mask, and a white throat and eyebrow.

Local names for the bird in India include Nasoni sorai (Assamese).

== Behaviour ==
The white-throated fantail lays three eggs in a small cup nest in a tree. It is insectivorous, and often fans its tail as it moves through the undergrowth.

The eggs are approximately 2 cm (0.79 in) in length. They are white in colour, with a band of brown spots around the middle, closer towards the base of the egg.

Birds use the same song year after year, with progressively small changes, with the result that the song sounds very different after 4–5 years. The male's call is a valuable tool in detection and identification of the bird, which can often be confused with the white-browed fantail, R. aureola, where their ranges overlap. R. aureola has light underparts and prominent spots in two rows on the wings.

== Subspecies ==
According to IOC there are 9 recognised subspecies. In alphabetical order, these are:

- R. a. albicollis (Vieillot, 1818)
- R. a. atrata Salvadori, 1879
- R. a. canescens (Koelz, 1939)
- R. a. celsa Riley, 1929
- R. a. cinerascens Delacour, 1927
- R. a. kinabalu Chasen, 1941
- R. a. orissae Ripley, 1955
- R. a. sarawacensis Chasen, 1941
- R. a. stanleyi Baker, 1916

== Gallery ==
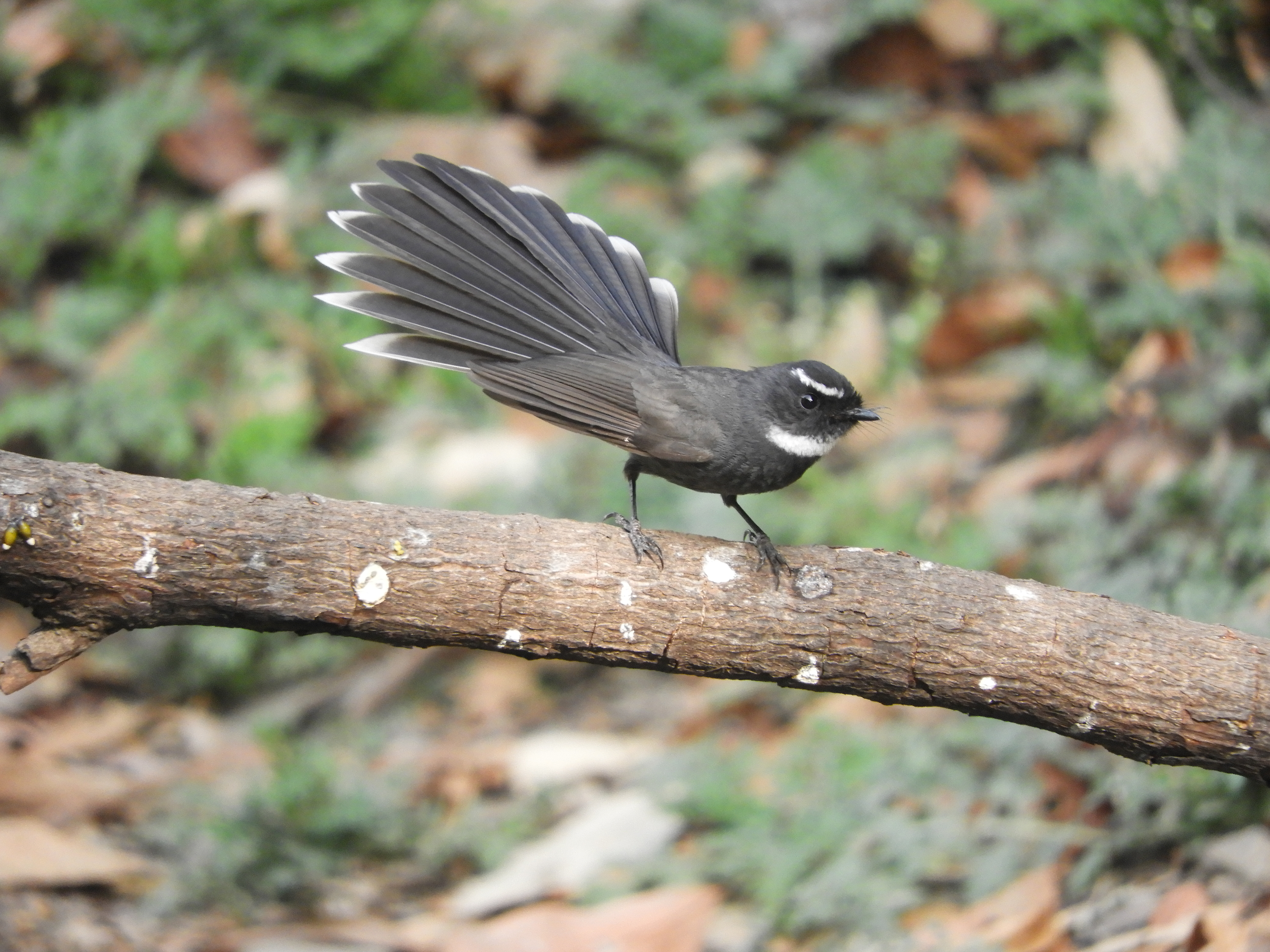
At Sattal near Bhimtal, India

Adult at nest from Nalbari, Assam, India

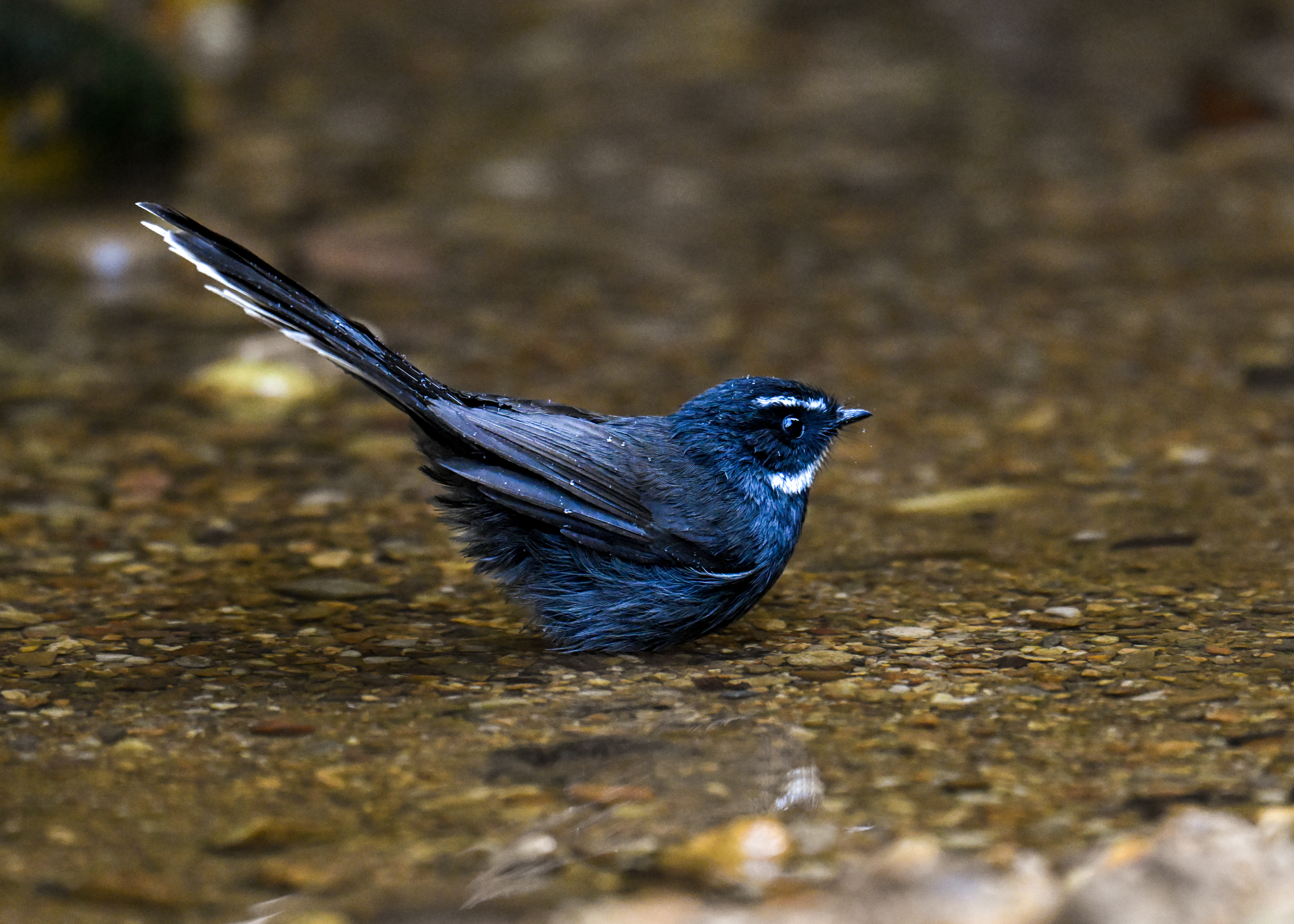
Spotted in Dulung Reserve forest, Lakhimpur District, Assam
