= Fairbank (surname) =

Fairbank is a surname. Notable people with the surname include:

- Alfred John Fairbank (1895–1982), British calligrapher
- Calvin Fairbank (1816–1898), American abolitionist
- Christopher Fairbank (born 1953), British actor
- Herbert S. Fairbank, American engineer
- Janet Fairbank (1903–1947), American opera singer
- Janet Ayer Fairbank (1878–1951), American author
- John K. Fairbank (1907–1991), American historian
- N. K. Fairbank (1829–1903), American businessman
- Richard Fairbank (born 1950), American businessman
- Samuel B. Fairbank (1822–1898), American evangelist
- Valerie Baker Fairbank (born 1949), American judge
- William M. Fairbank (1917–1989), American physicist
- Winthrop H. Fairbank (1857–1922), American politician

== See also ==
- Fairbanks (surname)
- Fairbanks family
