= Samuel B. Fairbank =

American evangelist, writer, translator and amateur naturalist

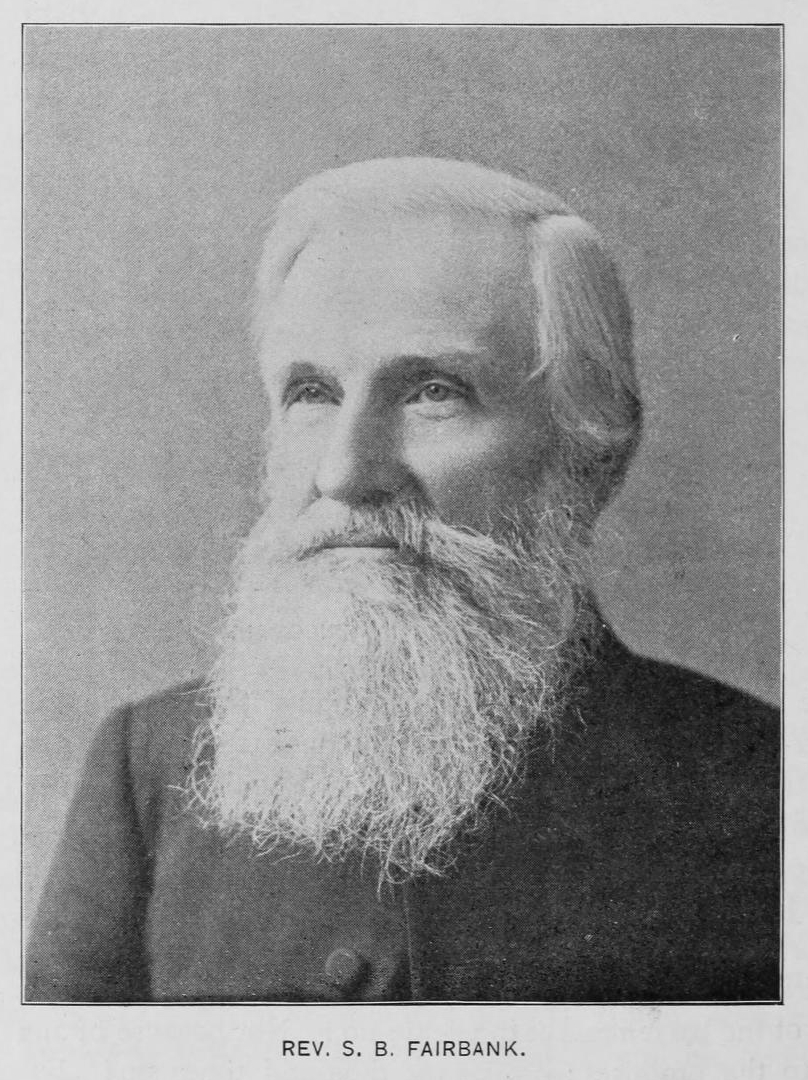
Portrait published in 1896

Samuel Bacon Fairbank D.D. (December 14, 1822 – May 31, 1898) was an American evangelist, writer, translator, and amateur naturalist who worked in India with the American Marathi Mission in western India, mainly in Wadala Bahiroba (Wadale), near Ahmednagar. Fairbank was responsible for some of the earliest translations of hymns into Marathi. He also worked on a number of initiatives to improve agriculture. His children and several relatives continued to work as missionaries in India. A bird species, Montecincla fairbanki, and the molluscs Fairbankia and Achatina fairbanki are named after him.

== Biography ==
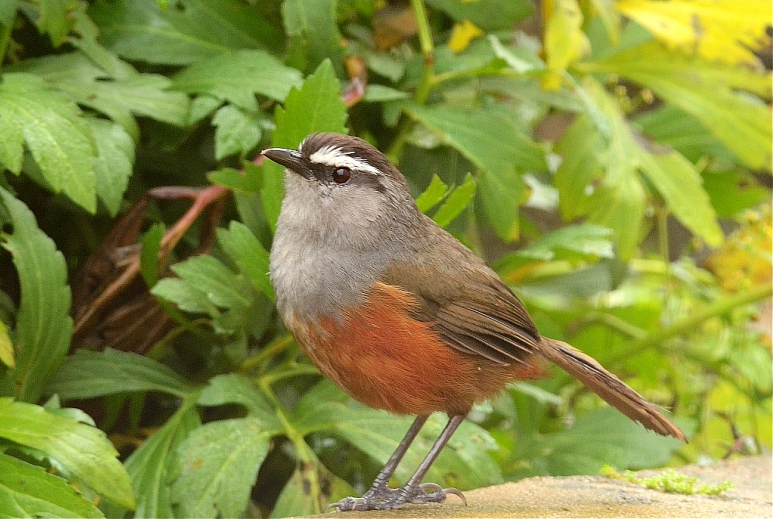
Trochalopteron fairbanki from the Palnis

Samuel was born in Stamford, Connecticut, the eldest son of John Barnard Fairbank, principal of a school. The family later moved to Massachusetts where they manufactured straw hats. Fairbank studied at Illinois earning an A.B. in 1842 and an A.M. in 1845 followed by studies at the Andover Theological Seminary. He was ordained D.D. in 1845. Shortly after marrying Abby Allen (died 1852), the couple moved to India, inspired by Rufus Anderson, to join the American Marathi Mission in western India. His work was mainly at Ahmednagar (1846 to 1850 and again from 1871 to 1879), Bombay (1850 to 1857), Wadala (1857 to 1871 with a break in the US from 1869-71) and from 1889 at Kodaikanai in South India. Fairbank had a camp on the ridge at Prospect Point in Kodaikanal. He visited the United States on three furloughs.

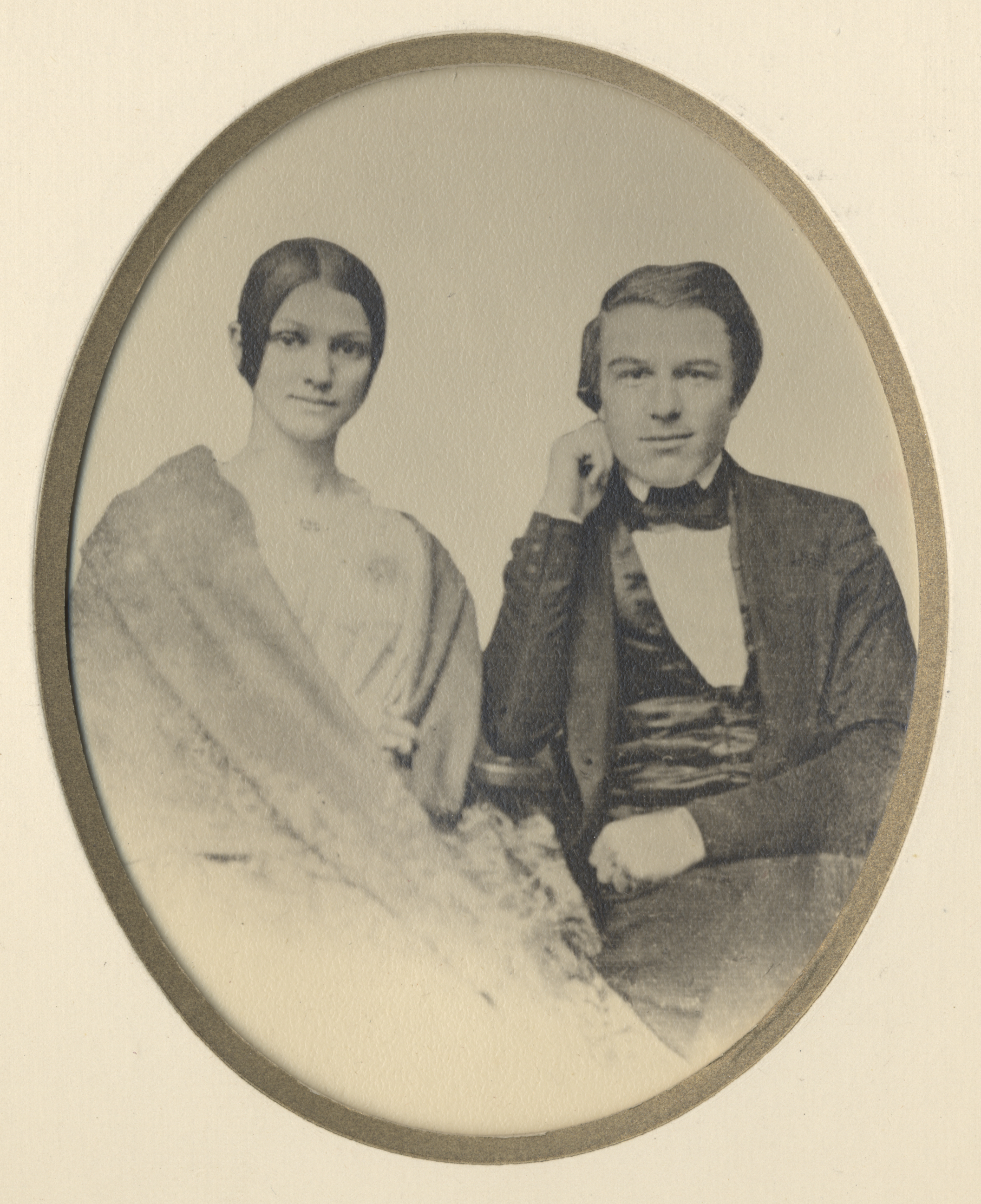
Abby (or Abbie) and Samuel Fairbank in 1846

Fairbank spent much of his time on evangelism through working with the local people. A deputation in 1854 led by Rufus Anderson of the American Board of Commissioners for Foreign Missions (ABCFM) came up with the suggestion that all missionaries needed to focus on evangelization rather than improving the lives of people. Despite this, Fairbank, went about his evangelization through attempts at improving the life of the people. He taught agriculture and attempted to introduce more efficient practices and implements. He had an ox-cart fitted out with a bedroom, kitchen, study and bath that he called as a tent-on-wheels. He travelled from village to village and found that having a spectacle helped attract people. He used projectors in the evening (Magic Lantern / Sciopticon) to give talks on the scriptures with visuals and made use of traditional "kirtans" for his evangelism. He translated hymns and transcribing them to make it suitable for local use with traditional tunes and singing styles. In his spare time, he also took an interest in natural history, making collections of molluscs, birds and plants. He also made studies of some molluscs in life. He wrote notes in the Gazetteer on natural history and his publications on the topic included a "Key to the Natural Orders of Plants in the Bombay Presidency", "Popular list of birds of the Bombay Presidency with Notes", "A list of the Birds of the Palani Hills, with Notes", "List of the Reptiles of the Bombay Presidency, with Notes" and "list of the Deccan fishes, with notes". He collaborated with other naturalists including William Thomas Blanford who named a genus of a mollusc Fairbankia after him although it is now a synonym of Iravadia. Achatina fairbanki was named after him by William Henry Benson. Blanford also named Trochalopteron fairbanki (now in the genus Montecincla) after a specimen collected by Fairbank from Kodaikanal. He also corresponded on birds with Allan Octavian Hume. A set of fern specimens collected by Fairbank reside in the Pringle Herbarium (VT), at the University of Vermont. The fern species Lastrea fairbankii was named after him by R.H. Beddome in 1867. His scientific activities led to his being nominated as a fellow of the University of Bombay in 1868

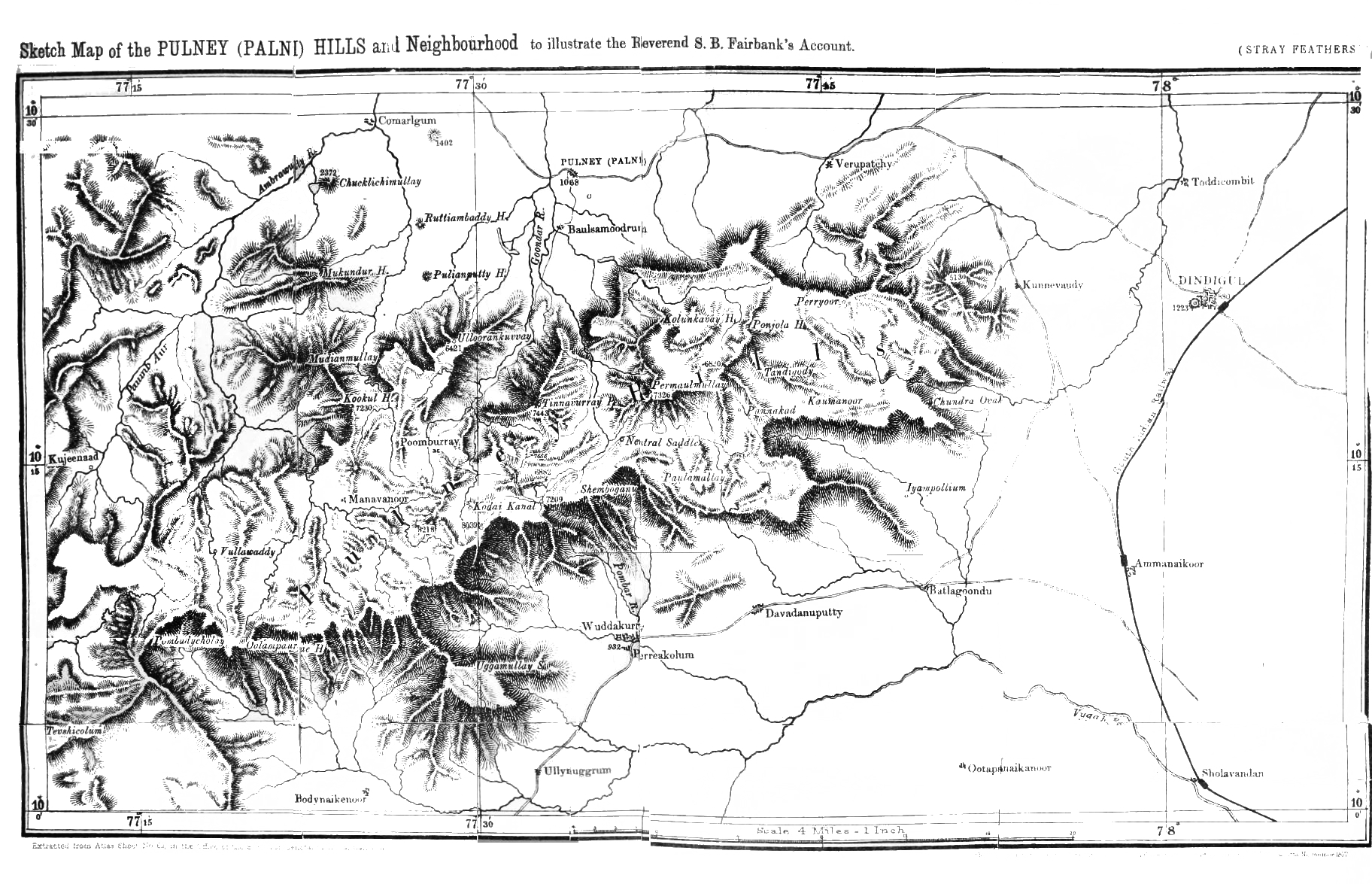
Map of the Palani hills where Fairbank collected plants and animal specimens

With Abby he had three children, two of whom died young; a daughter, Emily Maria married Rev. Thomas Snell Smith of Sri Lanka while Mary Crocker and John Melvin died young. After the death of Abby (during childbirth) in 1852, Fairbank married Mary Ballantine in 1856 (she died in 1878). They had daughters Anna (married Robert M. Woods), Katie (married Robert Allen Hume), Elizabeth (married William Walter Hastings), Rose (born 1874, married Dr Lester H. Beals), Mary Darling (a missionary who married T. A. Evans) and Grace (married H.M. Burr); sons Henry (born 1862) and Edward (born 1867) who became missionaries. Henry was also interested in ornithology and wrote Birds of Mahabaleshwar (1921); two sons Melvin and James died young. Edward along with his wife Marie Lively established the James Friendship Memorial Hospital at Vadala in 1938. It is also known as the Fairbank James Friendship Memorial Hospital. Rose and her husband Dr Lester Beals established the Willis F. Pierce Memorial Hospital in Wai, Satara District.

Samuel Fairbank died, possibly of heat stroke, while on a train to Kodaikanal on May 31, 1898. He was buried at Ahmednagar.
