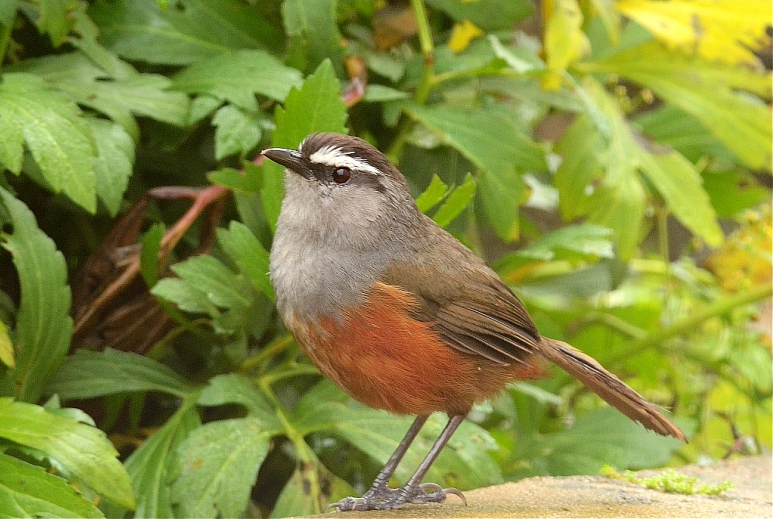
- in the Meghamalai

Conservation status
- Near Threatened (IUCN 3.1)

Scientific classification
- Kingdom: Animalia
- Phylum: Chordata
- Class: Aves
- Order: Passeriformes
- Family: Leiothrichidae
- Genus: Montecincla
- Species: M. fairbanki

Binomial name
- Montecincla fairbanki (Blanford, 1869)
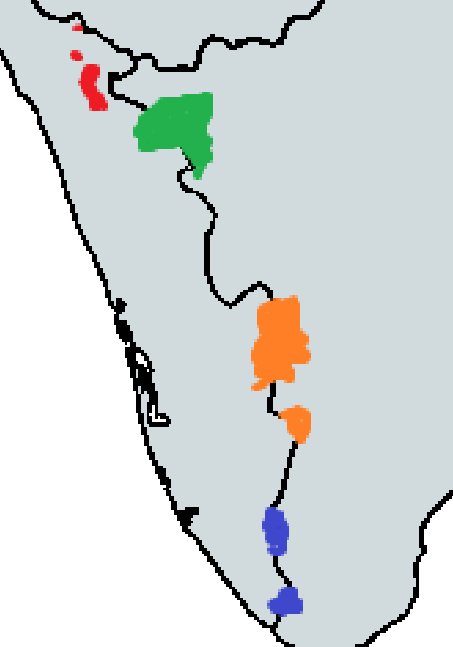
- Palani laughingthrush

Synonyms
- Garrulax jerdoni fairbanki Strophocincla fairbanki Trochalopteron fairbanki

= Palani laughingthrush =

Species of bird

The Palani laughingthrush (Montecincla fairbanki) is a species of laughingthrush endemic to the hills of the Western Ghats south of the Palghat Gap in Southern India. Found in the high montane forests, this grey bibbed, rufous bellied bird with a prominent dark eyestripe and broad white brow was grouped along with the grey-breasted subspecies of the black-chinned laughingthrush and known as the grey-breasted laughingthrush. This species is found in the Palni Hills while another closely related form, the Ashambu laughingthrush (Montecincla meridionalis) with a shorter white brow is found in the high hills south of the Achankovil Gap and was treated as a subspecies. The two forms were together formerly treated as the Kerala laughingthrush.

== Description ==
This species has a dark grey-brown crown and narrow dark grey eyestripe with a broad white supercilium above it. This supercilium extends behind the eye in this species but stops above the eye in the closely related meridionalis. The throat is distinctly grey unlike in the black-chinned laughingthrushes found north of the Palghat Gap and continues into the upper breast. The grey of the upper breast is faintly streaked in brown. The lower breast and belly is rusty brown and the upper parts are olive brown. The bill is browner and not as dark grey as in the black-chinned. The Ashambu laughingthrush (M. meridionalis) which was earlier treated as a subspecies has greyer upper plumage, paler crown and the centre of the belly is white with chestnut brown on the flanks and vent. The iris is dark red or red-brown. The sexes are indistinguishable in the field.

== Taxonomy ==
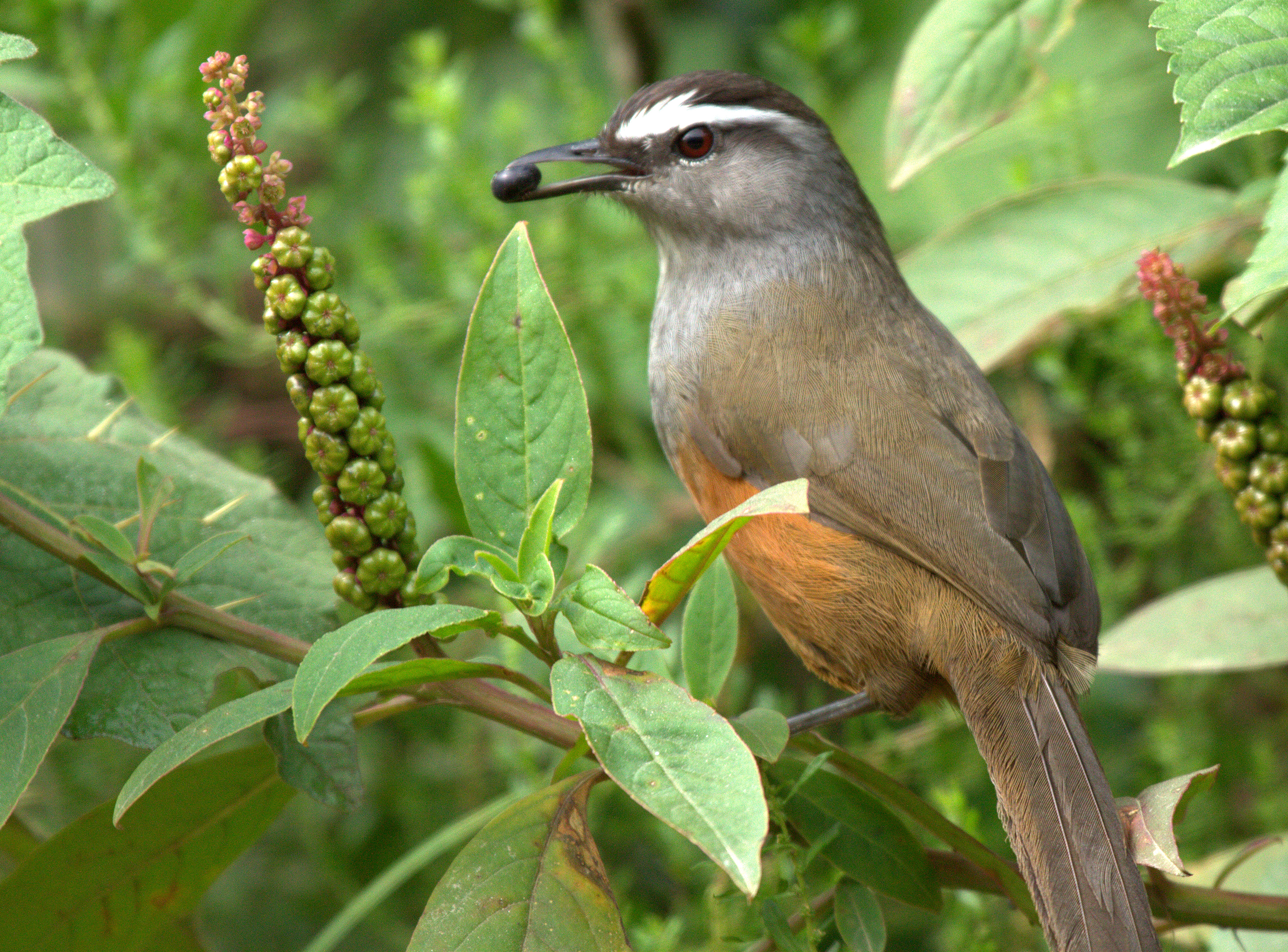
Feeding on a berry

This species was described from the Kodaikanal region on the basis of a specimen obtained by Rev. Samuel Bacon Fairbank and came to be called the Pulney laughing-thrush. The lack of the black chin of jerdoni was noted even when this species was first described but it was made into a subspecies under jerdoni in the second edition of The Fauna of British India, Including Ceylon and Burma in 1922 by Stuart Baker. In 1880 Blanford described meridionale based on a specimen obtained by F. W. Bourdillon. The close relationship of meridionale and fairbanki was noticed by William Ruxton Davison in 1883. The current regrouping of the forms, considering the Palghat Gap as a biogeographic barrier and giving importance to the chin colour, was introduced in 2005 by Pamela C. Rasmussen and Anderton. A study published in 2017 found that the species was best placed in a new genus Montecincla and that based on the divergence, meridionale is best treated as a full species.

== Behaviour and ecology ==
Measurements

Nominate
Length		175–185 mm (6.9–7.3 in)
Culmen		21–23 mm (0.8–0.9 in)
Wing	♂	83–91 mm (3.3–3.6 in)
	♀	81–86 mm (3.2–3.4 in)
Tail	♂	86–97 mm (3.4–3.8 in)
	♀	86–92 mm (3.4–3.6 in)
Tarsus		33–35 mm (1.3–1.4 in)

meridionale
Length		173–190 mm (6.8–7.5 in)
Culmen		21–22 mm (0.8–0.9 in)
Wing	♂	85–88 mm (3.3–3.5 in)
	♀	84–85 mm (3.3–3.3 in)
Tail		95–96 mm (3.7–3.8 in)
Tarsus		35–36 mm (1.4–1.4 in)

They are found in pairs and small groups and they sometimes join mixed-species feeding flocks. They feed on the nectar of flowers of Lobelia excelsa, Rhododendron and Strobilanthes species. They also feed on the petals of some flowers such as Strobilanthes and the fruits of a range of plants including Viburnum, Eurya, Rubus and Rhodomyrtus tomentosa.

The breeding season is December to June but peaking in April and May. The nest is a cup of grass with moss and lined with fine fibre placed in a low fork hidden in dense vegetation. The usual clutch is two blue eggs with reddish markings and indistinguishable from those of the black-chinned laughingthrush. When the nest is predated or after the young fledge, the nest is destroyed. The nests of other birds in the vicinity may also be torn up by the parent birds. Unhatched eggs may also be eaten by the parent birds.

The contact calls are very loud series of steeply ascending notes pee-koko... pee-koko followed by more abrupt notes. Numerous other vocalizations such as a low kweer calls are produced in other behavioural contexts. Some calls appear to be antiphonal duets.

== Distribution ==
This species is restricted south of the Palghat Gap with the main distribution range in the higher regions (above 1,100 metres (3,600 ft)) of the Palani Hills extending into the Annamalai Hills in western Tamil Nadu and Munnar in Kerala. The nominate subspecies is found north of the Achankovil gap while meridionale is found in the hills to the south of it. In the Palni Hills, their densities varied across locations ranging from 1.4 birds per hectare at Kukkal, 0.5/ha at Poombarai, 0.33/ha at Kodaikanal Botanical gardens, 0.16/ha on the golf course and 0.22/ha at Paricombai.
