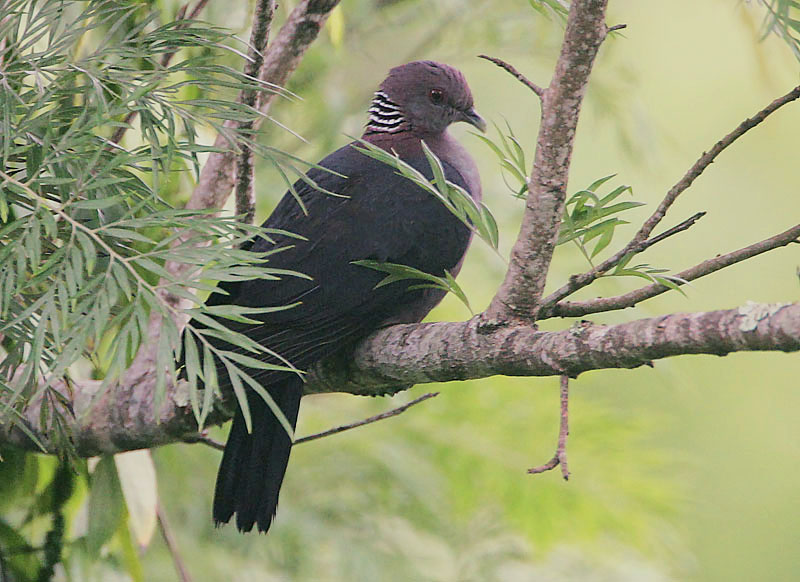

Conservation status
- Vulnerable (IUCN 3.1)

Scientific classification
- Kingdom: Animalia
- Phylum: Chordata
- Class: Aves
- Order: Columbiformes
- Family: Columbidae
- Genus: Columba
- Species: C. torringtoniae

Binomial name
- Columba torringtoniae (Kelaart, 1853)
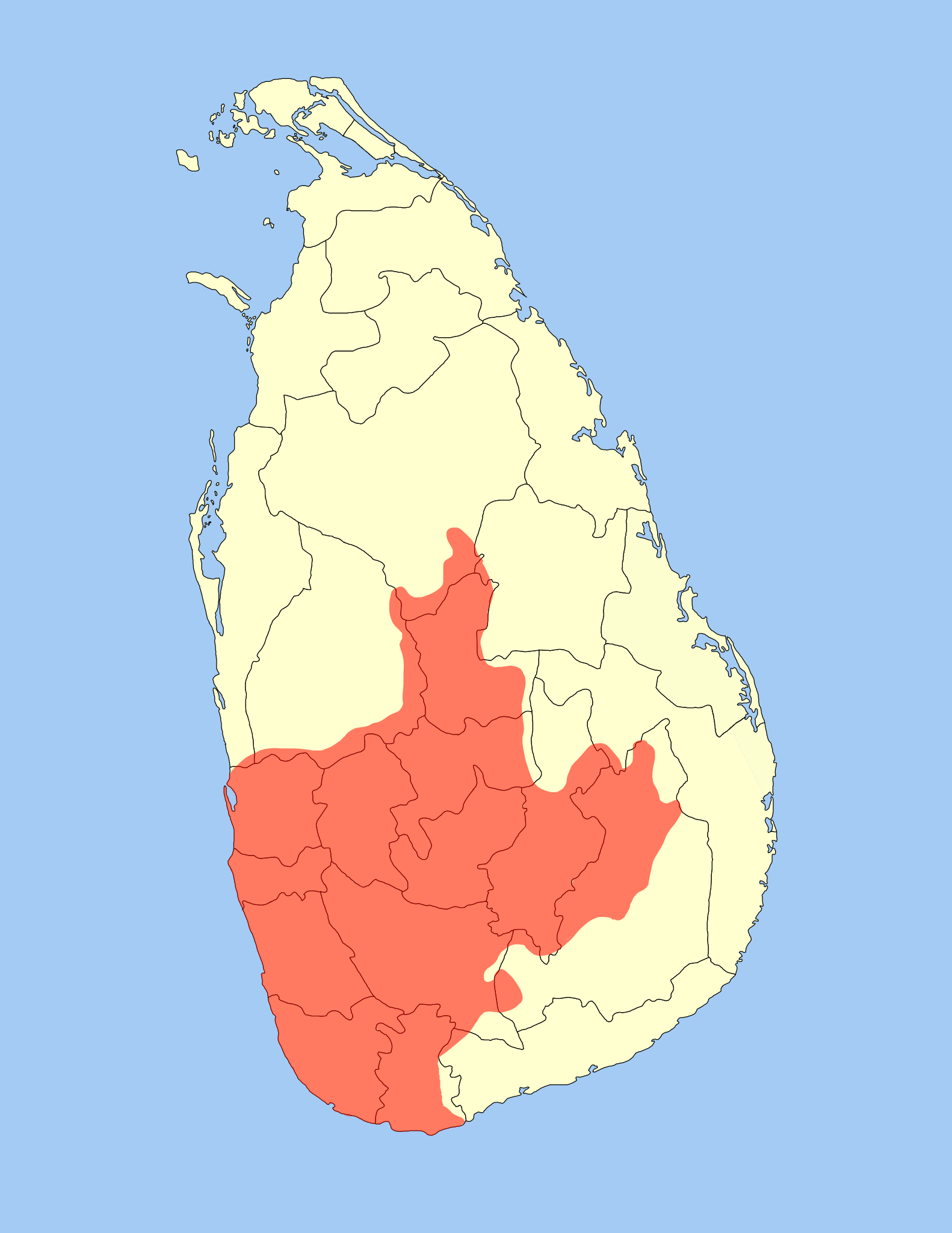

Synonyms
- Palumbus torringtoni Kelaart, 1853; Columba torringtoni (Kelaart, 1853)

= Sri Lanka wood pigeon =

Species of bird

The Sri Lanka wood pigeon or Ceylon wood pigeon (Columba torringtoniae) is a species of bird belonging to the family Columbidae, the pigeons and doves. This pigeon is endemic to Sri Lanka.

== Taxonomy ==
The Sri Lanka wood pigeon was first formally described as Palumbus torringtoni in 1853 by the Ceylon-born physician and naturalist Edward Frederick Kelaart with its type locality given as Newera-Ellia, Ceylon. This species is now classified in the genus Columba and is closely related to and most similar to the Nilgiri wood pigeon (C. elphinstonii) of the Western Ghats of southwestern India. The genus Columba is classified in the family Columbidae in the monotypic order Columbiformes.

== Etymology ==
The Sri Lanka woodpigeon is a member of the genus Columba which is derived from the Latin columba, "a dove", the feminine form of columbus, "a male dove", itself the latinisation of the Greek κόλυμβος (kolumbos), "diver", which derives from the verb κολυμβάω (kolumbaō), "to dive, plunge headlong, swim". The feminine form of kolumbos, κολυμβίς (kolumbis), "diver", was the name applied by Aristophanes and others to the common rock doves of Greece, because of the "swimming" motion made by their wings when flying. The specific name honours "Lady Torrington", presumably Mary Anne Byng, Viscountess Torrington (1805–1885), the wife of George Byng, 7th Viscount Torrington, who was the British Governor of Ceylon between 1847 and 1850. As the species was named in honour of a woman, the specific name uses the Latin suffix -ae.

== Description ==
The Sri Lanka wood pigeon is 36 cm (14 in) in length. It has a patch of checkerboard-like markings on the side of the neck The wings, back and tail are slate gery while the underparts aregrey tinged with mauve, the undertail covers are grey. Callss include a single, deep “wooo”, as wel as a double noted “woo-oo”, which resemble some owl calls.

== Distribution and habitat ==
The Sri Lanka wood pigeon is endemic to Sri Lanka, being found in the highlands of the centre of the island and the nearby foothills of the wet zone. This pigeon occurs in hill and montane forest, usually above around 900 m (3,000 ft). It does, however, migrate, descending to as low as 3300 to 450 m (980 to 1,480 ft) in the lowland forests of the wet zone.

== Biology ==
The Sri Lanka wood pigeon is an arboreal and fruit-eating bird. These birds move around their habitat preferring areas where fruit is available on trees, and is often reported feeding on fruiting trees outside forest. They nest between January and March and again from August to October. The nest is placed in tall forest trees.

== In culture ==
The Sri Lanka wood pigeon has featured on a 25c Sri Lankan postal stamp.
