= Fairbank Island (Michigan) =

Island in Chippewa County, Michigan

- Location within Michigan

Geography
- Location: Chippewa County, Michigan
- Coordinates: 46°0′20″N 83°48′17″W
- Highest elevation: 581 ft (177.1 m)

Administration
- United States

Fairbank Island is an island located in Chippewa County, Michigan, United States.
