= Fairbanks Township =

Fairbanks Township may refer to:

- Fairbanks Township, Sullivan County, Indiana
- Fairbanks Township, Michigan
- Fairbanks Township, St. Louis County, Minnesota
- Fairbanks Township, Renville County, North Dakota, in Renville County, North Dakota
