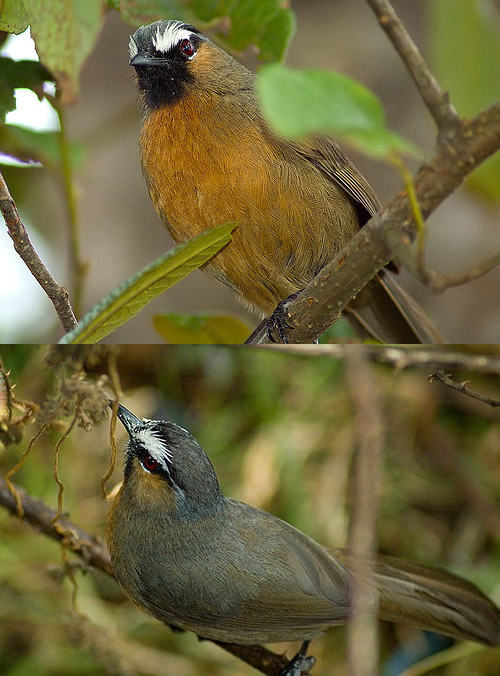
- Nilgiri laughingthrush, (Montecincla cachinnans)

Scientific classification
- Kingdom: Animalia
- Phylum: Chordata
- Class: Aves
- Order: Passeriformes
- Family: Leiothrichidae
- Genus: Montecincla; Robin et al., 2017

Species
- See text

= Montecincla =

Genus of birds

Montecincla is a genus of passerine birds in the family Leiothrichidae. All four species in this genus are endemic to “sky islands” in the Western Ghats mountain range of southwestern India, generally above 1,200m elevation.

== Species ==
The genus contains the following four species:

Image	Common name	Scientific name
	Nilgiri laughingthrush	Montecincla cachinnans
	Palani laughingthrush	Montecincla fairbanki
	Banasura laughingthrush	Montecincla jerdoni
	Ashambu laughingthrush	Montecincla meridionalis

The four species are found on the tops of mountain ranges separated by deep valleys and are thought to have speciated during global warming. The two pairs separated by the Palghat Gap are estimated to have diverged more than 5 million years ago.

- - - M. cachinnans
    - M. jerdoni
  - - M. fairbanki
    - M. meridionalis

Relationships between the species
