= Black-chinned laughingthrush =

The black-chinned laughingthrush or rufous-breasted laughingthrush has been split into the following species:

- Nilgiri laughingthrush, Montecincla cachinnans
- Banasura laughingthrush, Montecincla jerdoni
