= Grey-breasted laughingthrush =

The grey-breasted laughingthrush or Kerala laughingthrush has been split into the following species:

- Palani laughingthrush, Montecincla fairbanki
- Ashambu laughingthrush, Montecincla meridionalis
