= Fairbank Lake =

Lake in Ontario, Canada

- Location within Ontario
- Location: Ontario
- Coordinates: 46.465°N 81.425°W
- Type: Crater by meteorite
- Basin countries: Canada

Fairbank Lake is a lake in Northern Ontario, Canada, located within the Walden region of Greater Sudbury.

Located in the Fairbanks and Trill townships, it lies off Regional Road 4 (Fairbank Lake Road), running north of Ontario Highway 17. It is 55 kilometres west of downtown Sudbury. The lake is 705.1 hectares in size with a shoreline perimeter of 28.2 kilometres and a maximum depth of 43 metres.

The lake is home to Fairbank Provincial Park, a 105-hectare recreational-class provincial park.

== History ==
The lake was originally named Wa-Shai-Ga-Mog (Clear Lake) by the Ojibwe or Anishinaabe nation. According to the Fairbank Lake Camp Owner's Association, they had settled on the south west corner of the lake and traded at a Hudson's Bay trading post near Whitefish. The discovery of virgin white pine in 1872 resulted in lumbering activities on the south shore. The lake was officially named Fairbank Lake in 1883 after John Henry Fairbank, who was an MP for Lambton East.

== Islands ==
Fairbank lake contains 8 islands.

- Chapman Island
- Fairbank Island
- Hiram Hixon Island
- Maplegrove Island
- Pine Island
- Swanson Island
- Traverse Island
- Wittie Island

== See also ==
- List of lakes in Ontario
