= Fairbanks station =

Fairbanks station may refer to:

- Fairbanks Street station, a light rail stop in Massachusetts, United States
- Fairbanks Depot, a railway station in Alaska, United States
- Fairbank station, a light rail station in Ontario, Canada
