= Fairbanks (surname) =

Fairbanks is a surname. Notable people with the surname include:

- Arthur Fairbanks (1864–1944), American art historian and administrator
- Avard Fairbanks (1897–1987), American sculptor
- Charles Rufus Fairbanks (1790–1841), Canadian lawyer, judge, entrepreneur and politician
- Charles W. Fairbanks (1852–1918), American politician, Senator from Indiana, Vice President under President Theodore Roosevelt
- Charles H. Fairbanks (1913–1984), American archaeologist and anthropologist
- Chuck Fairbanks (1933–2013), American football coach
- Cornelia Cole Fairbanks (1852–1913), American women's suffragist
- Dana Fairbanks, fictional character in American TV drama The L Word
- Douglas Fairbanks (1883–1939), American actor, screenwriter, director, and producer
- Douglas Fairbanks, Jr. (1909–2000), American actor and naval officer
- Edward Fairbanks (1850–1924), Canadian merchant and politician
- Erastus Fairbanks (1792–1864), American manufacturer and politician
- Franklin Fairbanks (1828–1895), American businessman and politician
- Gene Fairbanks (born 1982) Australian professional rugby union footballer
- George Rainsford Fairbanks (1820-1906), American lawyer, politician, Florida state senator and fruit grower
- Horace Fairbanks (1820–1888), American politician, Vermont state senator, Governor of Vermont
- Jason Fairbanks (1780–1801), American murderer
- Jerry Fairbanks (1904–1995), American film and TV producer and director
- John B. Fairbanks (1855–1940), American Latter-day Saint artist
- Jonathan Fairbanks (1594–1668), English colonist in New England
- Jonathan Leo Fairbanks (born 1933), American artist
- Joseph Fairbanks (1718–1796), Canadian merchant and politician
- E. LeBron Fairbanks (born 1942), American retired minister in the Church of the Nazarene
- Lloyd Fairbanks (born 1953), former Canadian football player
- Lucile Fairbanks (1917–1999), American actress
- Mabel Fairbanks (1915–2001), American figure skater and coach
- Madeline and Marion Fairbanks (1900–1989 and 1900–1973), American twins, stage and film actresses
- Nola Fairbanks (1924–2021), American actress
- Ortho R. Fairbanks (1925–2015), American artist
- Pete Fairbanks (born 1993), American baseball player
- Ralph Jacobus Fairbanks (1857–1943), American prospector, entrepreneur and pioneer
- Richard M. Fairbanks (1941–2013), American lawyer, diplomat and businessman
- Thaddeus Fairbanks (1796–1886), American inventor
- William Fairbanks (1894–1945), American actor

== See also ==
- Fairbank (surname)
- Fairbanks family
