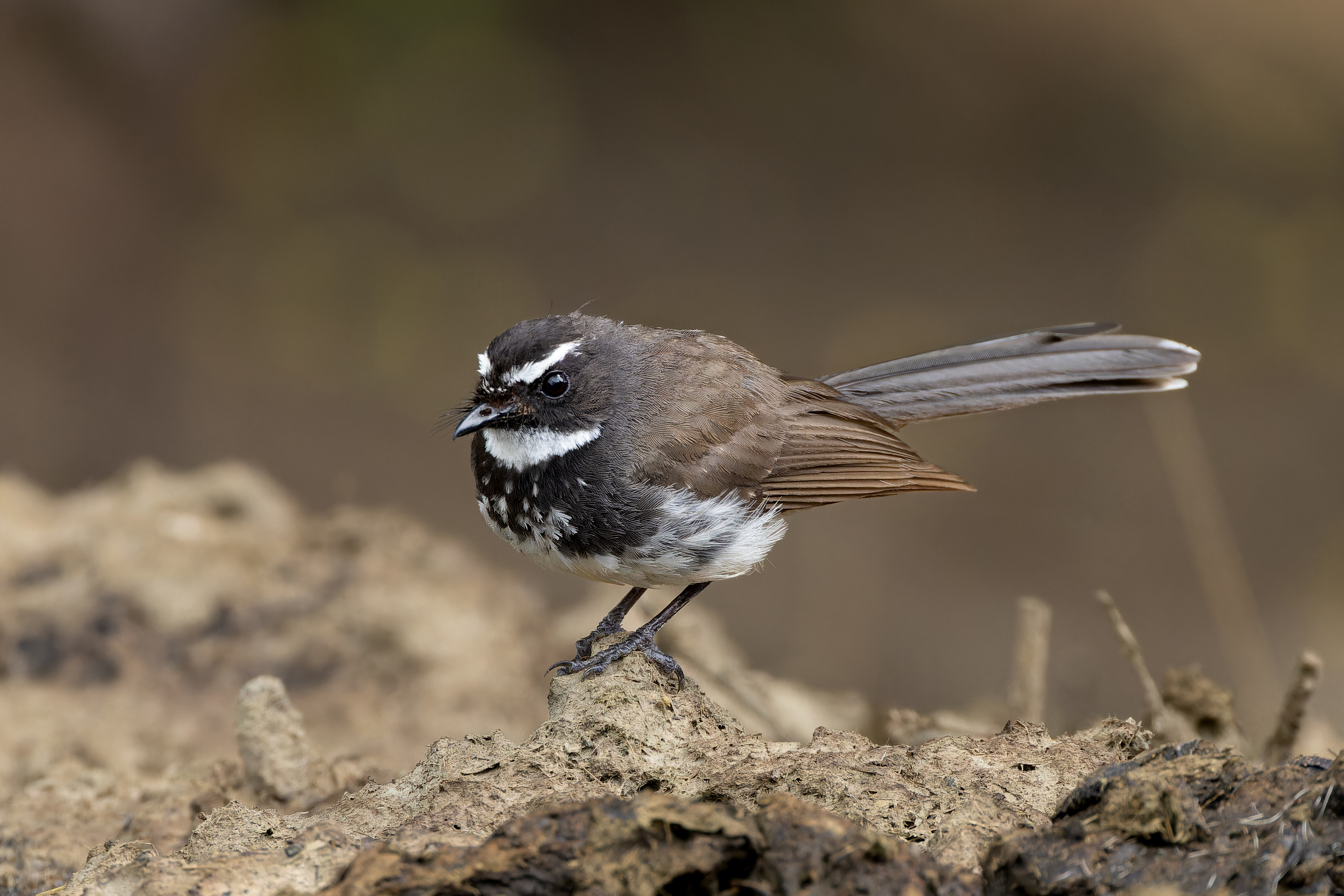
- Seen around Saswad, Maharashtra, India.

Conservation status
- Least Concern (IUCN 3.1)

Scientific classification
- Kingdom: Animalia
- Phylum: Chordata
- Class: Aves
- Order: Passeriformes
- Family: Rhipiduridae
- Genus: Rhipidura
- Species: R. albogularis

Binomial name
- Rhipidura albogularis (Lesson, 1831)

= White-spotted fantail =

Species of bird

The white-spotted fantail or spot-breasted fantail (Rhipidura albogularis) is a small passerine bird. It is found in forest, scrub and cultivation in southern and central India. It was formerly considered a subspecies of the white-throated fantail.

== Taxonomy ==
The white-spotted fantail was formally described in 1831 by the French naturalist René Lesson under the binomial name Muscicapa (Muscylva) albogularis. It is now one of over 60 fantails placed in the genus Rhipidura that was introduced in 1827 by the naturalists Nicholas Vigors and Thomas Horsfield.

Two subspecies are recognised:

- R. a. albogularis (Lesson, RP, 1831) – peninsular India
- R. a. vernayi (Whistler, 1931) – southeast India

== Description ==
The adult white-spotted fantail is about 19 cm (7.5 in) long. It has a dark fan-shaped tail, edged in white, and white supercilium and throat. Birds are mainly slate grey above, with a black eye mask, and a white throat and eyebrow. It has whitish underparts, and a grey breast band that is spotted white.

== Behaviour ==
The white-spotted fantail lays three eggs in a small cup nest in a tree.

The white-spotted fantail is insectivorous, and often fans its tail as it moves through the undergrowth.

Not normally renowned as a songster, the male uses a fixed and unmistakable pattern of musical notes in its call. The notes are loud and normally divided into two stanzas – the first with 5–6 trilling notes rising and falling, followed by 4–5 notes rising up the scale and ending in the highest note.

Birds use the same song year after year, with progressively small changes, with the result that the song sounds very different after 4–5 years. The male's call is a valuable tool in detection and identification of the bird.

== Gallery ==
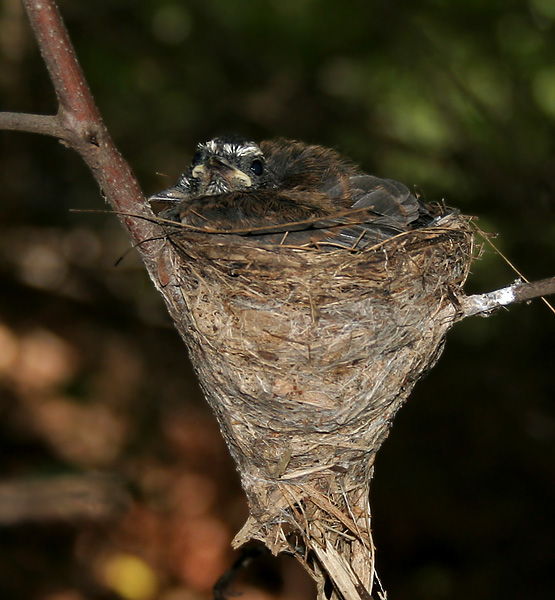
Nest with chicks at Ananthagiri Hills, in Rangareddy district of Andhra Pradesh, India.

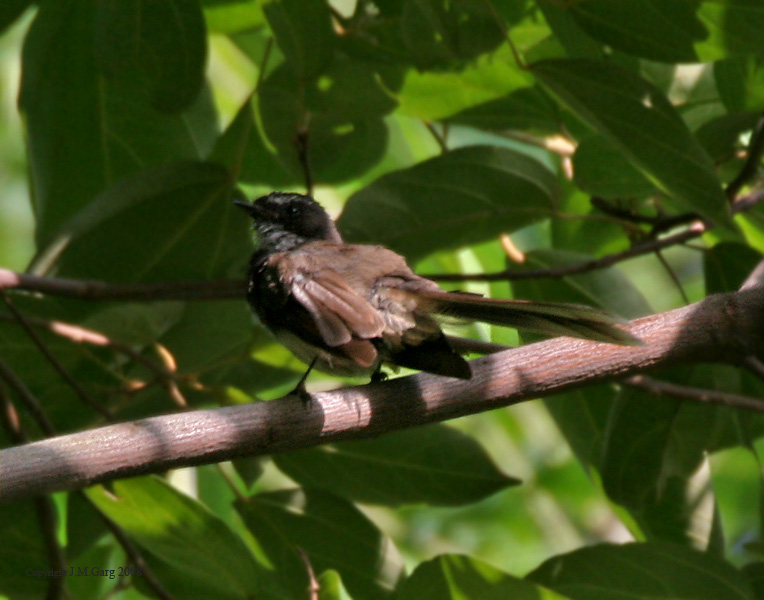
White-spotted fantail at Ananthagiri Hills, in Rangareddy district of Andhra Pradesh, India.
