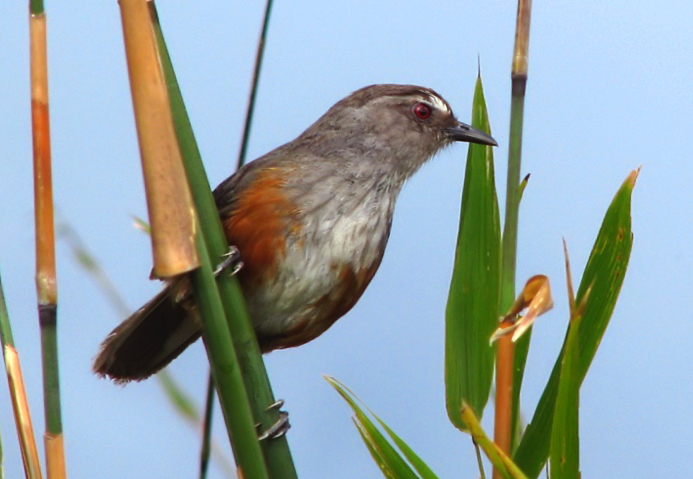

Conservation status
- Vulnerable (IUCN 3.1)

Scientific classification
- Kingdom: Animalia
- Phylum: Chordata
- Class: Aves
- Order: Passeriformes
- Family: Leiothrichidae
- Genus: Montecincla
- Species: M. meridionalis

Binomial name
- Montecincla meridionalis (Blanford, 1880)
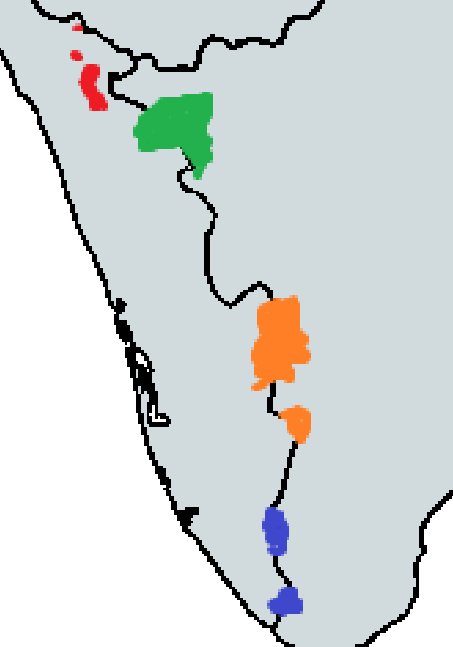
- Ashambu laughingthrush

Synonyms
- Montecincla meridionale

= Ashambu laughingthrush =

Species of bird

The Ashambu laughingthrush or Travancore laughingthrush (Montecincla meridionalis) is a species of bird in the family Leiothrichidae. It is found in the Western Ghats in southern Kerala and southern Tamil Nadu. It was formerly considered a subspecies of the grey-breasted laughingthrush. It is closely related to the Palani laughingthrush and can be differentiated from it by its very short white brow that stops before the eye.

The species is found in the high hills and is part of a complex of several species which are thought to have speciated by being isolated in the cool tops of the higher hills of southern India as the climate became warmer. Earlier included in other genera, they were placed in a newly established genus in 2017.
