= Calix =

Calix may refer to:

== People ==
- Cristian Cálix (born 1999), Honduran footballer
- Luis Cálix (footballer, born 1965), Honduran football midfielder
- Luis Cálix (soccer player, born 1988), American soccer defender and son of the Honduran footballer
- Mira Calix, professional name of musician Chantal Francesca Passamonte (1969–2022)
- Carlos Cálix Castro (born c. 1963), Costa Rican former footballer and manager

== Businesses and organizations ==
- Calix Inc., a telecommunications equipment company
- Calix Limited, a research company
- Calix Society, a counselling organisation

== See also ==
- François-Claudius Compte-Calix, French painter
- Carmen Meléndez de Cálix (fl. 1957), Honduran politician
- Calyx (disambiguation)
- Kalix, a place in Sweden
- Kylix, a type of ancient Greek cup
