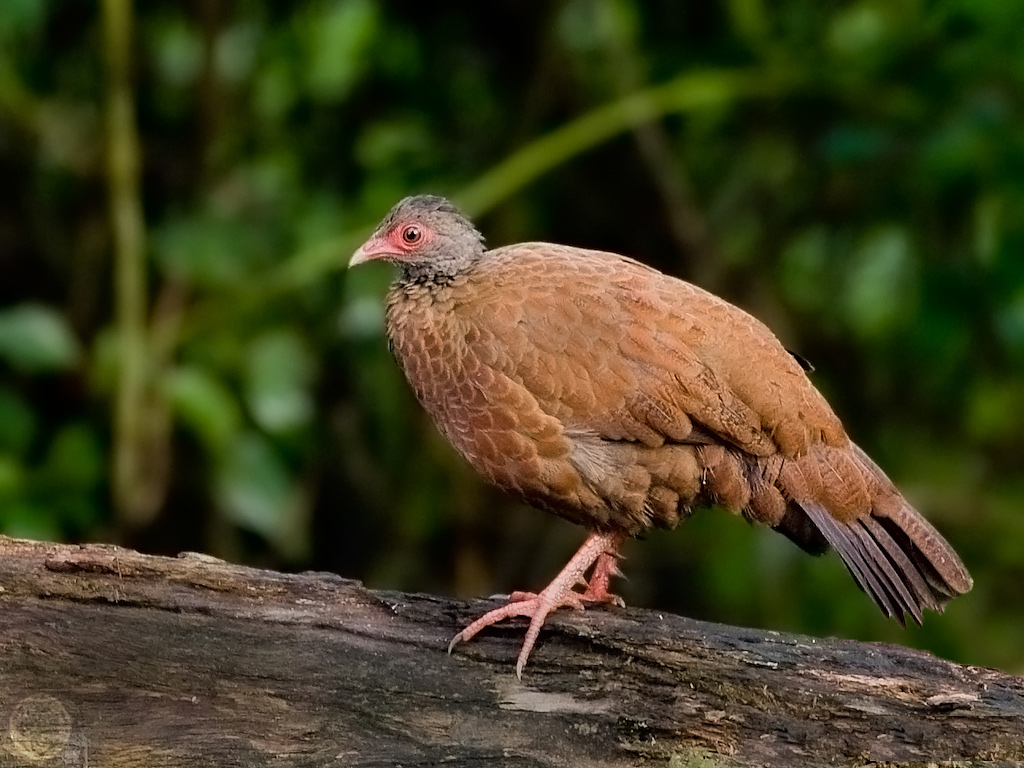

Conservation status
- Least Concern (IUCN 3.1)

Scientific classification
- Kingdom: Animalia
- Phylum: Chordata
- Class: Aves
- Order: Galliformes
- Family: Phasianidae
- Genus: Galloperdix
- Species: G. spadicea

Binomial name
- Galloperdix spadicea (Gmelin, JF, 1789)

Audio

= Red spurfowl =

Species of bird

The red spurfowl (Galloperdix spadicea) is a member of the pheasant family and is endemic to India. It is a bird of forests, and is quite secretive despite its size. It has a distinctive call and is often hard to see except for a few seconds when it flushes from the undergrowth. It appears reddish and like a long-tailed partridge. The bare skin around the eye is reddish. The legs of both males and females have one or two spurs, which give them their name.

== Taxonomy ==
The red spurfowl was formally described in 1789 by the German naturalist Johann Friedrich Gmelin in his revised and expanded edition of Carl Linnaeus's Systema Naturae. He placed it with all the grouse like birds in the genus Tetrao and coined the binomial name Tetrao spadiceus. Gmelin based his description on Pierre Sonnerat's "La perdrix rouge de Madagascar". Gmelin specified the type locality as Madagascar. This is an error, the species is found in India. The red spurfowl is now placed with painted spurfowl and the Sri Lanka spurfowl in the genus Galloperdix that was introduced in 1845 by the English zoologist Edward Blyth. The genus name combines the Latin word gallus for a "farmyard cock" with perdix meaning "partridge". The specific epithet spadicea is from Latin spadix, spadicis meaning "chestnut-coloured" or "date-coloured".

Three subspecies are recognised:

- G. s. spadicea (Gmelin, JF, 1789) – west Nepal and north, central India
- G. s. caurina Blanford, 1898 – Aravalli red spurfowl. Aravalli Range of southern Rajasthan (west India)
- G. s. stewarti Baker, ECS, 1919 – central, south Kerala (south India)

In colouration, the females show clinal variation becoming darker towards the south of their range. The name used in Marathi was recorded as Kokee-tree and is probably onomatopoeic.

== Description ==
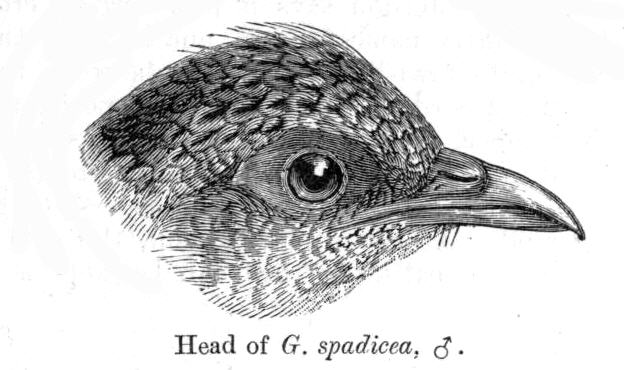

Overall reddish-brown, this large partridge-like bird has a somewhat long tail. The upper parts are brown with dark barring while the face and neck are more grey in the male. The underside is rufous with dark markings and both sexes have a red facial skin patch and red legs with one or two spurs (rarely three or four while females may have none). Downy chicks have an unmarked cinnamon brown head, a dark brown band along the back bordered by creamy stripes edged with thin lines of dark brown. The male of the distinctive Kerala race, G. s. stewarti has all-chestnut plumage, including the head feathers. Both sexes have long feathers on the crown that can be erected into a crest.

== Distribution and habitat ==
The species is found in scrub, dry and moist-deciduous forests often in hilly country. They are found south of the Ganges across India. They prefer areas with good undergrowth including those formed by the invasive Lantana.

== Behaviour and ecology ==
Calls imitated by a greater racket-tailed drongo

Red spurfowl usually forage in small parties of three to five. When walking around, the tail is sometimes held vertical as in domestic fowl. They are quite silent in the day but call in the mornings and evenings. They feed on fallen seeds, berries, mollusks and insects apart from swallowing grit to aid digestion. When flushed, the usually fly a short distance and stay in well-defined territories throughout the year. They roost in trees.

The calls include a distinct ker-wick...kerwick... and harsh karr...karrr... notes. The Marathi name Kokatri is echoic in origin.

The breeding season is January to June, mainly before the rains. A ground nesting bird, it lays 3-5 eggs in a scrape. Males are monogynous which usually indicates greater male investment in parental duties but they do not incubate. Males have been observed to distract the attention of predators when females with chicks are nearby.

The widespread nematode Heterakis gallinae has been recorded in the species in captivity while Ixodid ticks have been noted in the wild. A species of helminth Lerouxinema lerouxi has been described with the red spurfowl as type host. Keratinophilic fungi such as Ctenomyces serratus have been noted from the species.
