= Calyx =

Calyx or calyce (pl.: calyces), from the Latin calix, which itself comes from the Ancient Greek κάλυξ (kálux) meaning "husk" or "pod", may refer to:

== Biology ==
- Calyx (anatomy), collective name for several cup-like structures in animal anatomy
- Calyx (botany), the collective name for the sepals of a flower
- Calyce (beetle), a genus of beetles
- Calyx (sponge), a genus of sea sponges
- Calyx of Held, a large synapse in the auditory brainstem structure
- Eubela calyx, species of sea snail
- Renal calyx, a chamber in the kidney that surrounds the apex of the renal pyramids

== Companies ==
- CALYX, an American non-profit publisher
- Calyx Institute, an American non-profit education and research organization

== Published works ==
- Calyx (magazine), an American literary magazine
- Calyx, the yearbook of Washington and Lee University
- "Calyx", a song on the album Hatfield and the North (album)

== Other uses ==
- Calyx (fictional moon), a fictional moon in Colony Wars
- Calyx (musician), a British drum and bass act
- Calyce (mythology), several figures in Greek mythology
- "Calyx", a textile design by Lucienne Day
- Calyx, a type of krater in ancient Greek pottery
- Calyx, a glasshouse and exhibition centre in the Royal Botanic Garden, Sydney
- Real name of American professional wrestler Sol Ruca.

== See also ==
- Calix (disambiguation)
