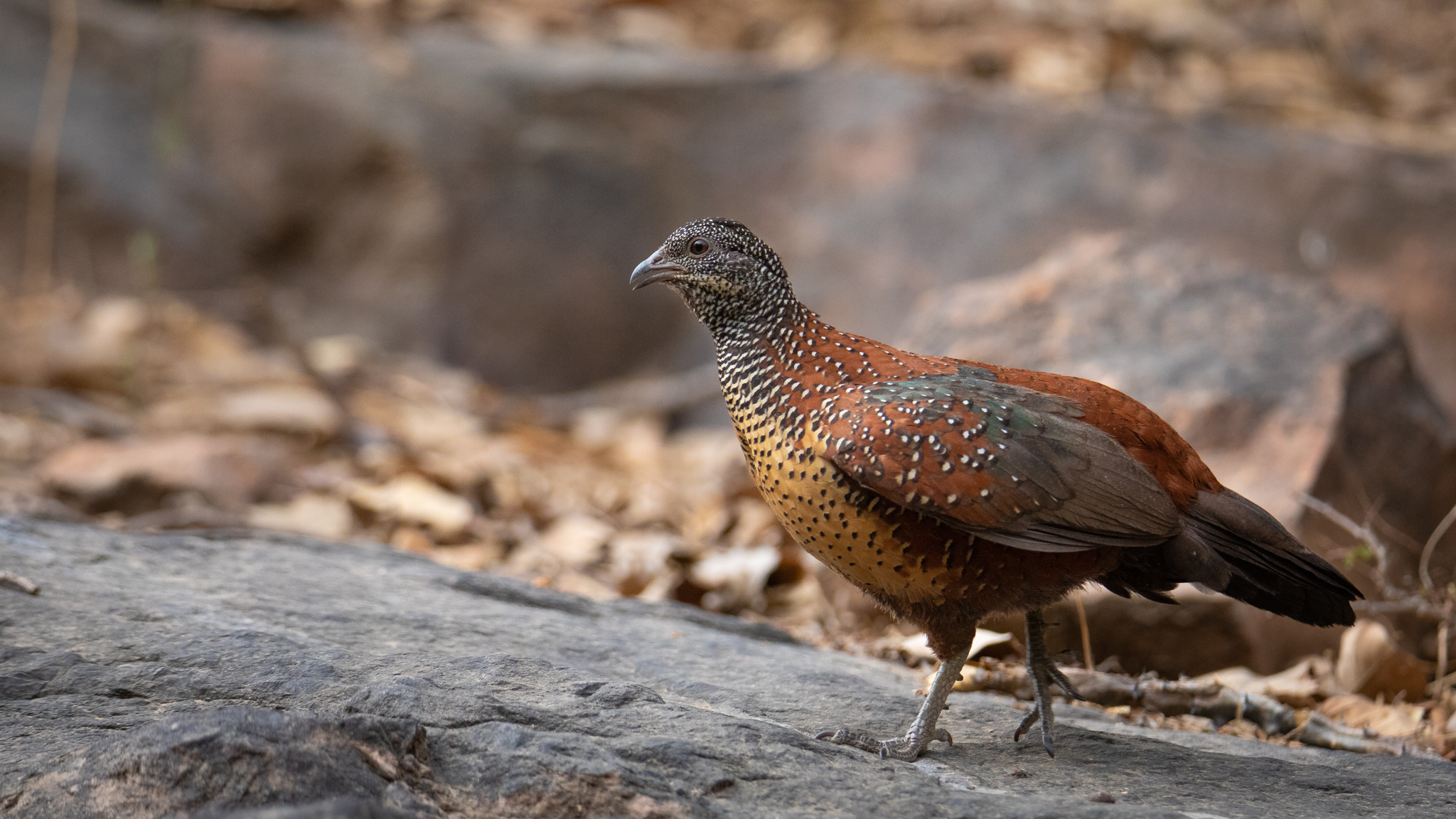
- Individual from Ranthambore National Park

Conservation status
- Least Concern (IUCN 3.1)

Scientific classification
- Kingdom: Animalia
- Phylum: Chordata
- Class: Aves
- Order: Galliformes
- Family: Phasianidae
- Genus: Galloperdix
- Species: G. lunulata

Binomial name
- Galloperdix lunulata (Valenciennes, 1825)

Synonyms
- Francolinus hardwickii

= Painted spurfowl =

Species of bird

The painted spurfowl (Galloperdix lunulata) is a bird of the pheasant family found in rocky hill and scrub forests mainly in peninsular India. Males are more brightly coloured and spotted boldly in white. Males have two to four spurs while females can have one or two of the spurs on their tarsus. The species is found mainly in rocky and scrub forest habitats unlike the red spurfowl. It is found in the undergrowth in pairs or small groups, escaping by running and rarely taking to the wing when flushed.

== Description ==
This spurfowl is distinctive in having no bare facial skin as in the red spurfowl. The male has a black tail and ochre underparts that contrast with the darker upperparts. The plumage of the upper parts and the feathers have white spots edged with black. The head and neck of the male are black with a green sheen and finely spotted in white while the mantle, rump and wing coverts are chestnut. The female is much duller with a rufous brow and ear coverts. The throat is pale and spotted as in the male but the female lacks white spotting on the body. The bill and legs are dark grey, with two to four tarsal spurs on the male. Females can also have one or two spurs. The tail is sometimes carried upright.

== Distribution and habitat ==
The painted spurfowl is found in some parts of the Aravalli ranges in Rajasthan, the hills of central India (Pachmarhi) and the rocky hills and dry forest areas of southern India. They have also been recorded in the Nallamala region in the Andhra Pradesh Eastern Ghats. The habitat is drier than that of the red spurfowl. In parts of southern India, they are found in rocky hills with scrub slopes, a habitat that is also used by the yellow-throated bulbul.

== Behaviour and ecology ==
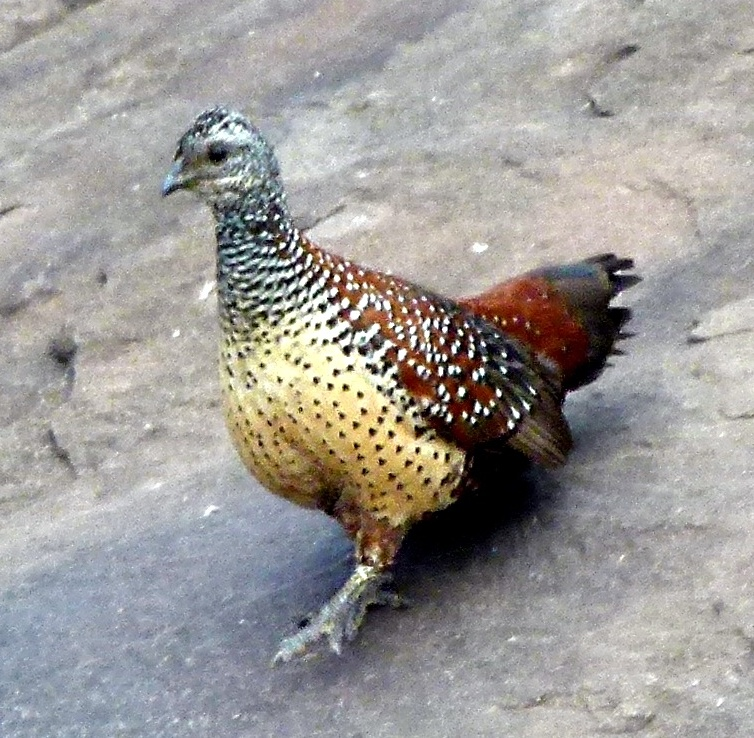
Painted Spurfowl (Galloperdix lunulata). Daroji Sloth bear sanctuary, India

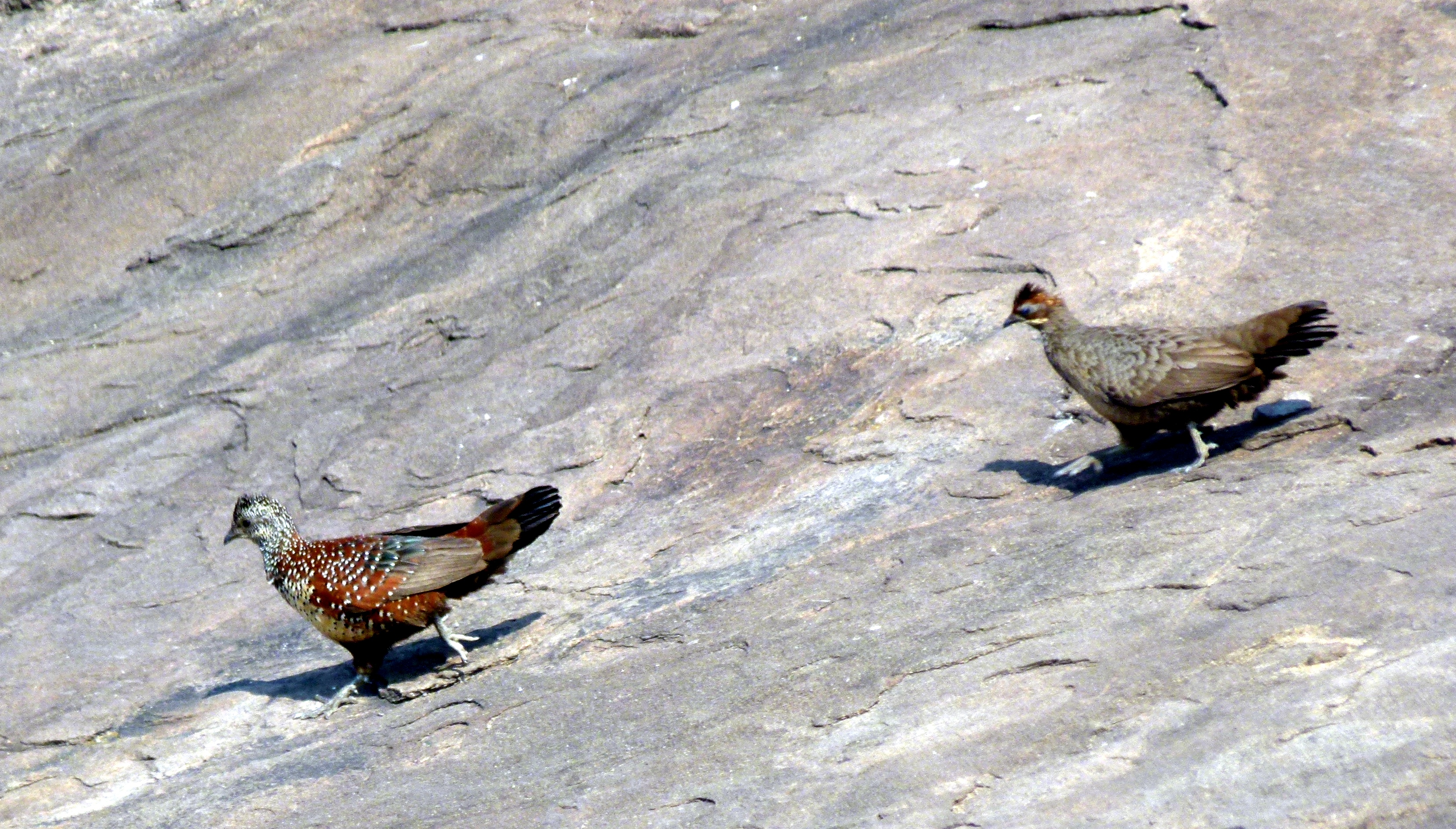
Male and female

The painted spurfowl is found in pairs or small family parties of up to 6 individuals and tends to stay in the undergrowth, rarely taking to flight. The call is a loud repeated series of chuguk calls. They feed on berries (including Ziziphus oenoplia and Lantana camara) as well as insects and flowers (Madhuca longifolia); and visit waterholes in the early morning. The breeding season is January to June (mainly February, but chicks have been seen in August, after the rains, in parts of Rajasthan). Courtship involves the male offering food held in the bill to the hen. Spurfowl are as a genus thought to be monogamous. The nest is a scrape in the ground lined with leaves often located below a boulder. The clutch is three to four, rarely five, pale creamy eggs. Only the female incubates, but both parents take care of the chicks. They will use distraction displays to lead predators away from the chicks.
