= Eubela mcgintyi =

Scientific classification
- Kingdom: Animalia
- Phylum: Mollusca
- Class: Gastropoda
- Subclass: Caenogastropoda
- Order: Neogastropoda
- Superfamily: Conoidea
- Family: Raphitomidae
- Genus: Eubela
- Species: E. mcgintyi

Binomial name
- Eubela mcgintyi Schwengel, 1943

Synonyms
- Daphnella macgintyi Poirier, 1954

Species of gastropod

Eubela mcgintyi is a species of sea snail, a marine gastropod mollusk in the family Raphitomidae.

== Description ==
The length of the shell attains 5.4 mm.

== Distribution ==
E. mcgintyi can be found in waters off both coasts of Florida at depths between 55 m to 146 m.
