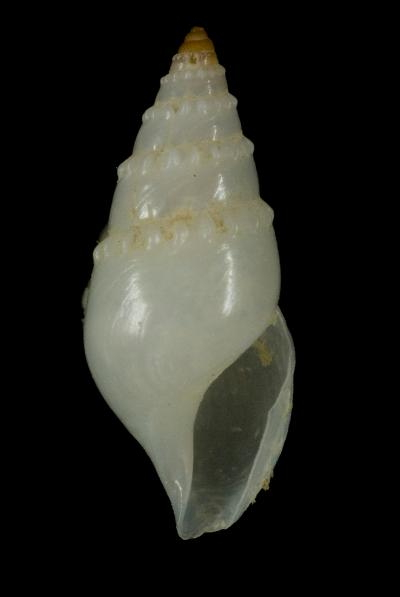
- Eubela sp. (specimen at MNHN, Paris)

Scientific classification
- Kingdom: Animalia
- Phylum: Mollusca
- Class: Gastropoda
- Subclass: Caenogastropoda
- Order: Neogastropoda
- Superfamily: Conoidea
- Family: Raphitomidae
- Genus: Eubela; Dall, 1889

Type species
- Pleurotoma limacina Dall, 1881

Species
- See text

= Eubela =

Genus of gastropods

Eubela is a genus of sea snails, marine gastropod mollusks in the family Raphitomidae.

== Description ==
The shell is smooth, glossy, with a sutural band. The outer lip is sharp. A shallow anal sinus and a short angular siphonal canal recall that of Trichotropis.

== Species ==
Species within the genus Eubela include:

- Eubela aequatorialis Thiele, 1925
- † Eubela awakinoensis Powell, 1942
- Eubela calyx (Dall, 1889)
- Eubela distincta Thiele, 1925
- Eubela limacina (Dall, 1881)
- Eubela mcgintyi Schwengel, 1943
- † Eubela monile Marwick, 1931
- Eubela nipponica Kuroda, 1938
- Eubela plebeja Thiele, 1925

Species brought into synonymy

- Eubela sofia (Dall, 1889): synonym of Xanthodaphne sofia (Dall, 1889)
