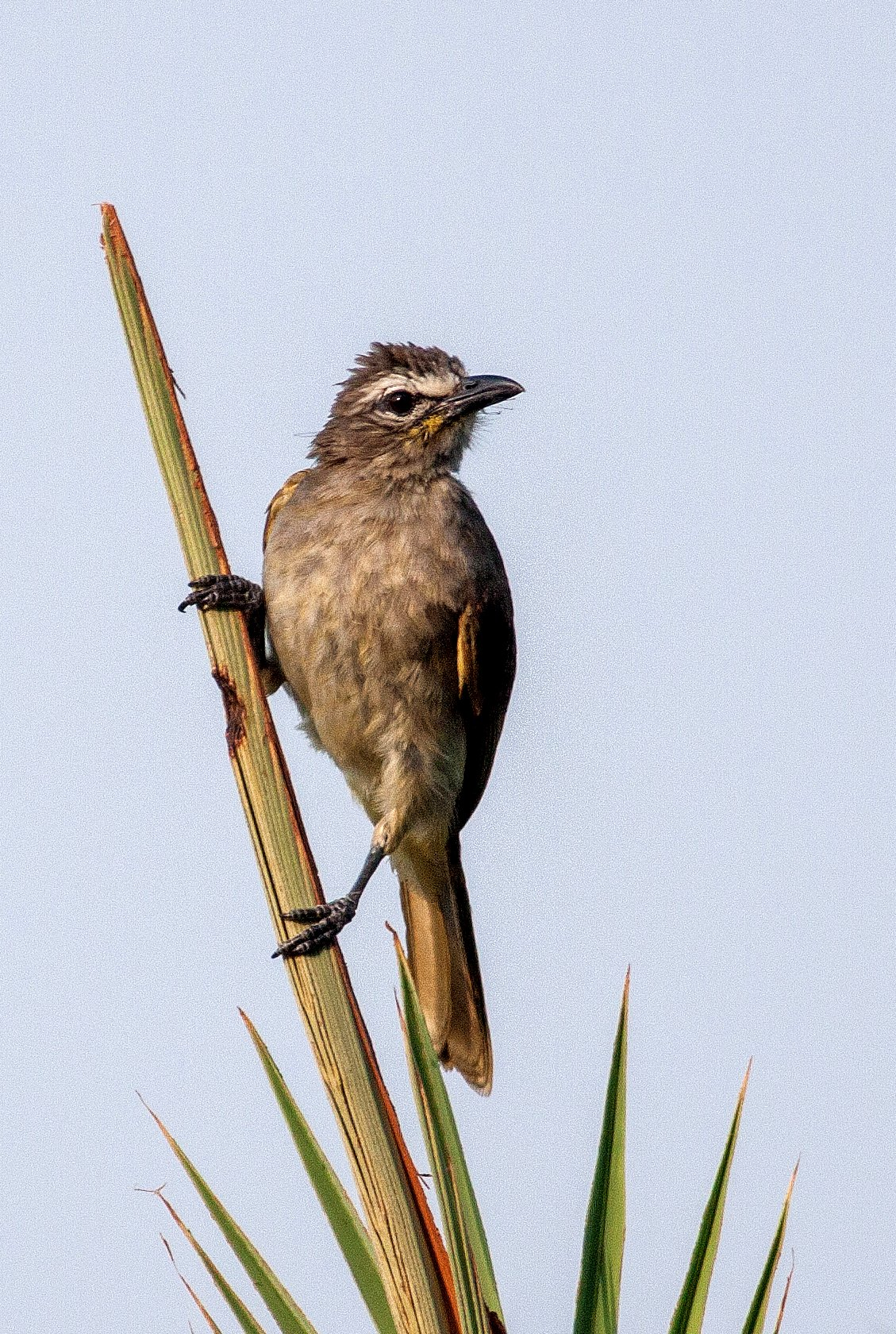
- P. l. luteolus Maharashtra, India
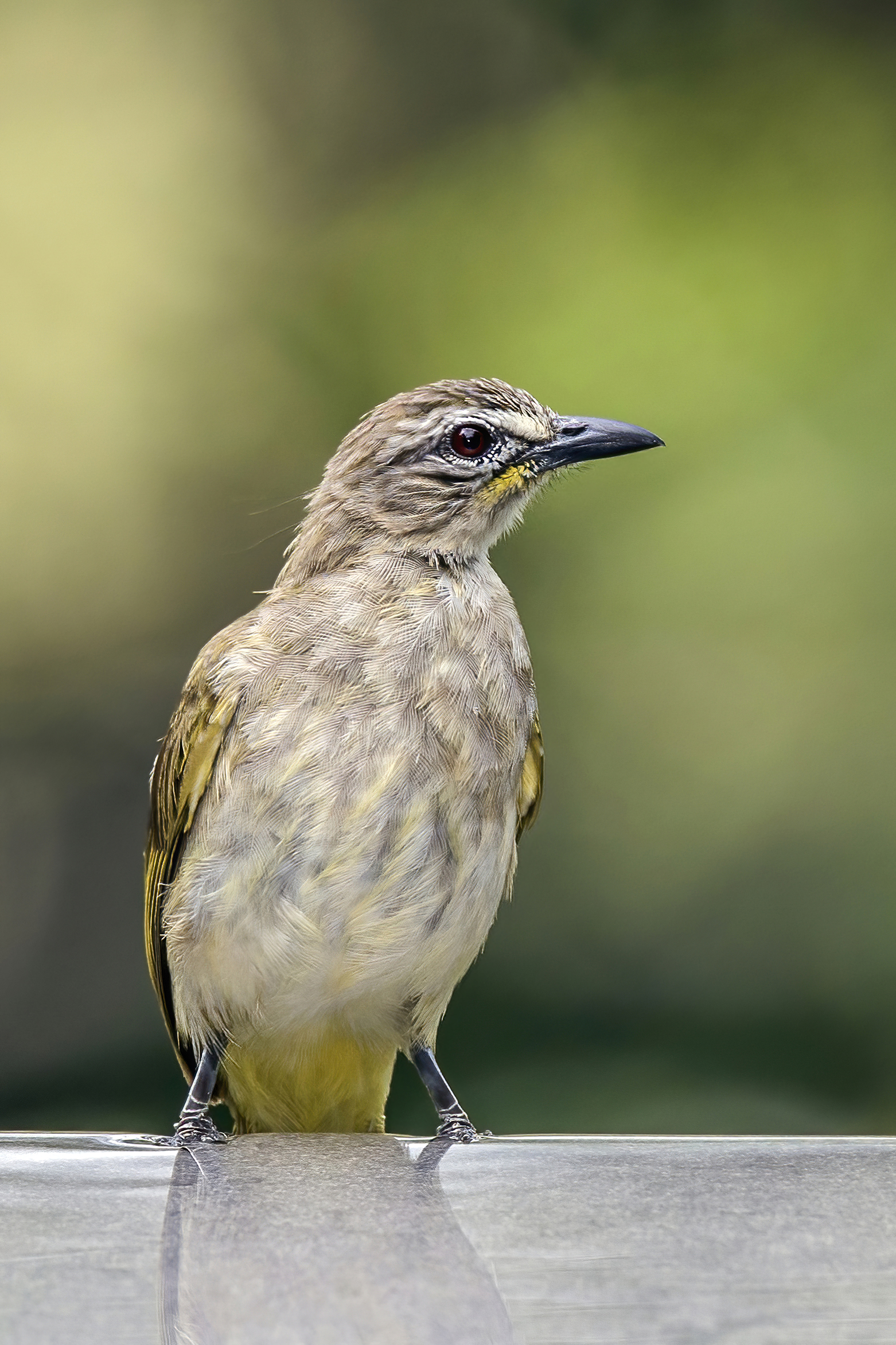
- P. l. insulae, Sri Lanka

Conservation status
- Least Concern (IUCN 3.1)

Scientific classification
- Kingdom: Animalia
- Phylum: Chordata
- Class: Aves
- Order: Passeriformes
- Family: Pycnonotidae
- Genus: Pycnonotus
- Species: P. luteolus

Binomial name
- Pycnonotus luteolus (Lesson, 1841)
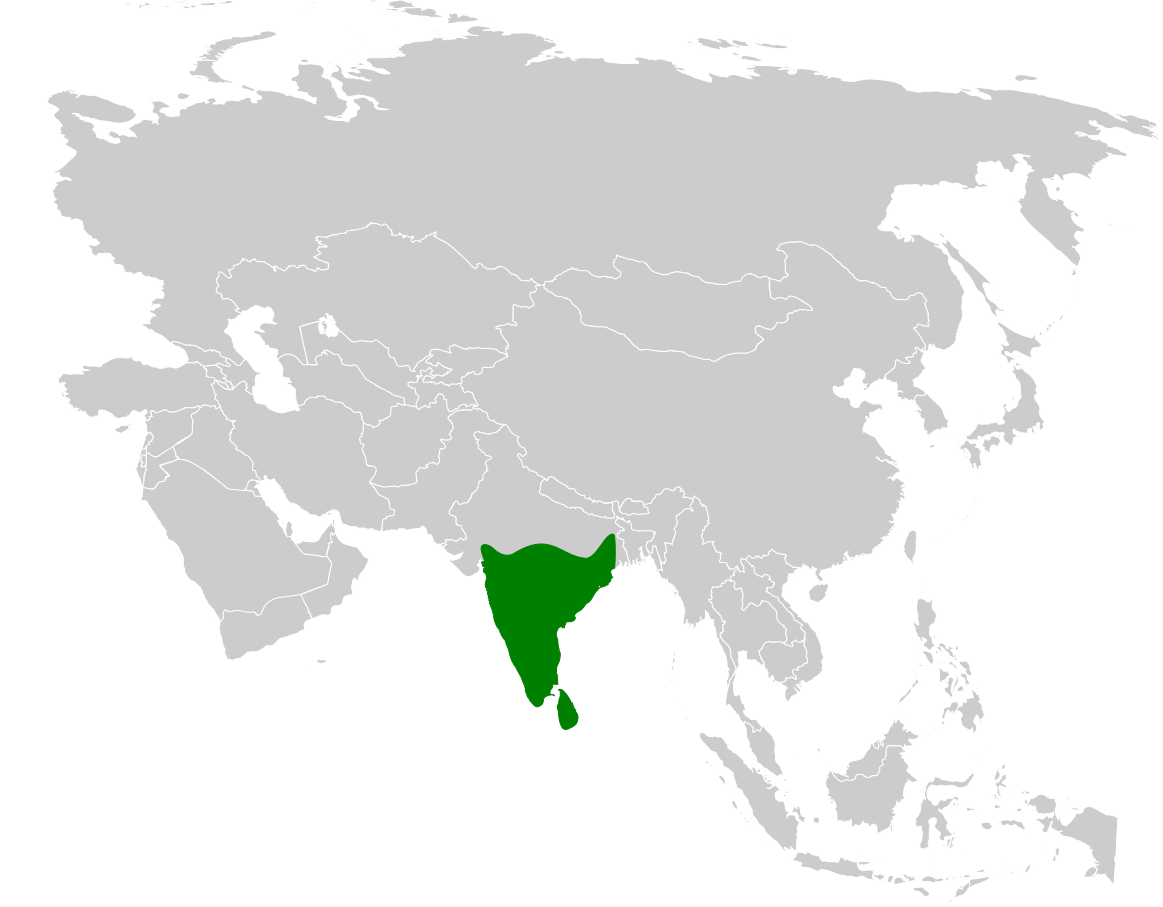

Synonyms
- Haematornis luteolus

= White-browed bulbul =

Species of bird

The white-browed bulbul (Pycnonotus luteolus) is a member of the bulbul family of passerine birds. It is a resident breeder in Sri Lanka and peninsular India. Largely olive coloured above with whitish underparts, it has a pale supercilium and a yellow vent. They are found in dense scrub habitats, where they skulk within vegetation and can be difficult to see although their loud and distinct burst of calls is distinctive.

== Taxonomy and systematics ==
=== Subspecies ===
Two subspecies are recognized:

- P. l. luteolus - (Lesson, 1841): Found in central and southern India
- P. l. insulae - Whistler & Kinnear, 1932: Found in Sri Lanka

== Description ==
The white-browed bulbul is about 20 cm (7.9 in) long, with a moderately long (8 centimetres or 3 inches) tail. It has olive-grey upperparts and whitish underparts. This species is identifiable by the white supercilium, white crescent below the eye, and dark eyestripe and moustachial stripe. The vent is yellowish and there is some yellow on the chin and moustache. The throat is, however, largely whitish unlike in the similar looking and sounding yellow-throated bulbul, which is found in rockier habitats. Three or four hair-like filoplumes are present on the nape. Sexes are similar in plumage. It is usually detected by the burst of song that it produces from the top of a bush and often dives into the bush becoming difficult to see. The song is a rich, spluttering warble and the bird is more often heard than seen. P. l. insulae is slightly darker and has a shorter wing than the nominate race.

== Distribution and habitat ==
This species is endemic to southern India and Sri Lanka. The northern boundary occurs across Gujarat, Madhya Pradesh and western West Bengal (near Midnapur). It is found in dry open scrub country mainly on the plains and also occurs in gardens and woodlands with dense shrubbery.

== Behaviour and ecology ==
A pair in a cashew tree (Goa, India)

Song recorded at Bangalore, India

White-browed bulbuls are usually seen singly or in pairs. They forage within bushes for fruit, nectar and insects. The breeding season is spread out from March to September and they may possibly breed twice a year. Peaks in breeding occur in February and again in September. The dry season of May to July appears to be avoided for breeding in the Point Calimere region. They build a nest, a loose cup made of twigs, cobwebs and hair placed low in a thick bush and usually on the periphery. Two eggs form the typical clutch. Individuals may live for more than 11 years.

== Other sources ==
- Vijayan, VS. (1975) Ecological isolation of bulbuls (Family Pycnonotidae, Class Aves) with special reference to Pycnonotus cafer cafer (Linn.) and Pycnonotus luteolus luteolus (Lesson) at Point Calimere, Tamil Nadu. Ph.D. Dissertation, University of Bombay, Bombay.
