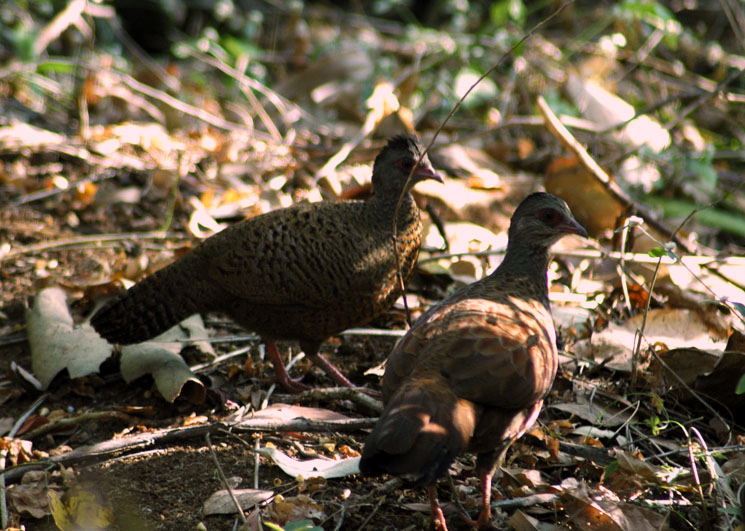
- Red spurfowl

Scientific classification
- Kingdom: Animalia
- Phylum: Chordata
- Class: Aves
- Order: Galliformes
- Family: Phasianidae
- Subfamily: Phasianinae
- Genus: Galloperdix; Blyth, 1845

Type species
- Tetrao spadiceus (red spurfowl) Gmelin, JF, 1789

Species
- See text

= Galloperdix =

Genus of birds

Galloperdix is a genus of three species of bird in the pheasant family, Phasianidae. These terrestrial birds are restricted to the Indian subcontinent, with the red spurfowl and painted spurfowl in forest and scrub in India, and the Sri Lanka spurfowl in forests of Sri Lanka. They share the common name "spurfowl" with the members of the genus Pternistis which are widely distributed in Africa.

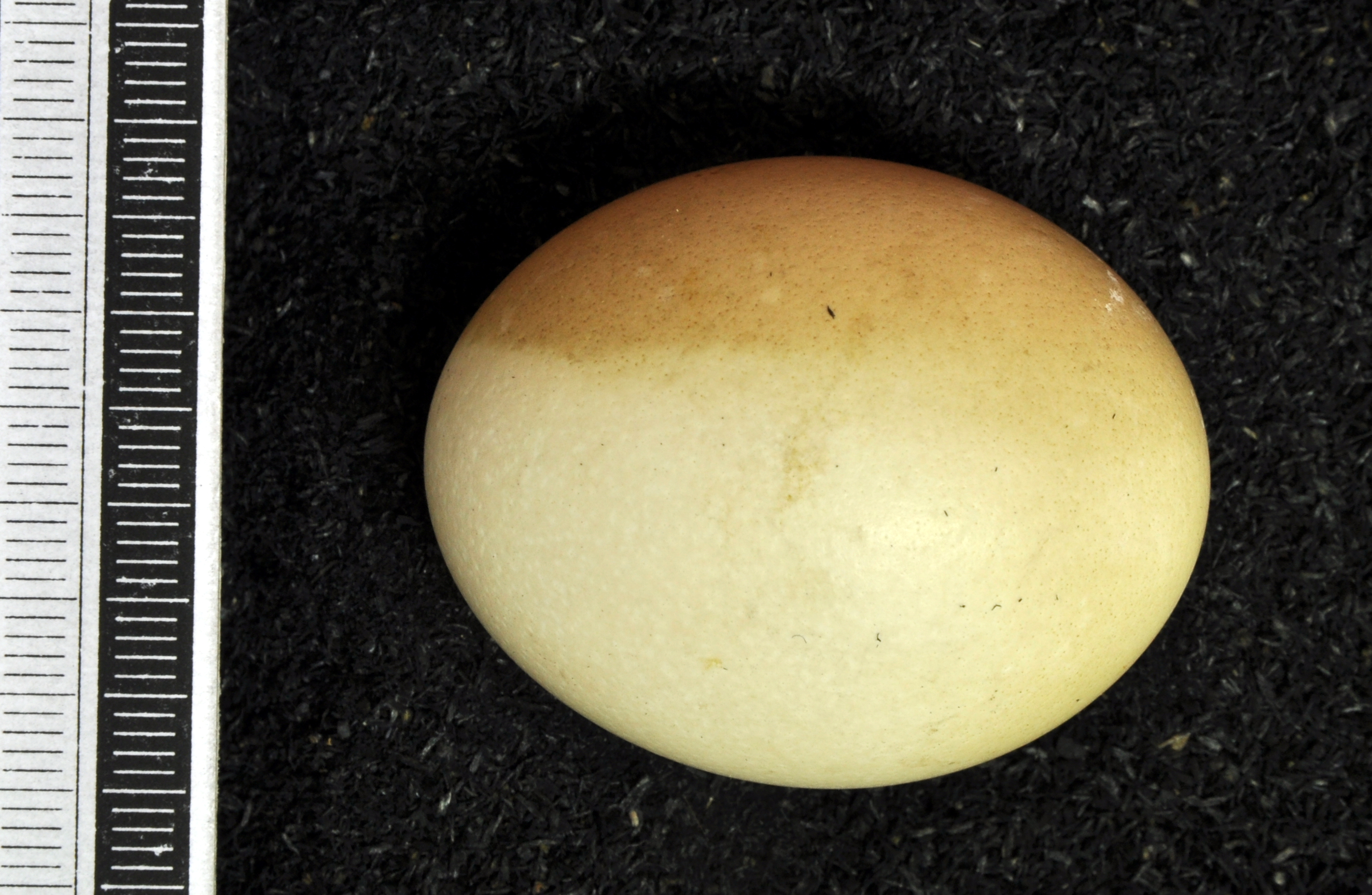
Egg, Collection Museum Wiesbaden

== Taxonomy ==
The genus Galloperdix was introduced in 1845 by the English zoologist Edward Blyth to accommodate a single species, the red spurfowl, which is therefore the type species. The genus name combines the Latin word gallus for a "farmyard cock" with perdix meaning "partridge".

The genus Galloperdix is sister to the genus Polyplectron and together they form a clade that is sister to Haematortyx.

The genus contains three species:

- Red spurfowl Galloperdix spadicea
- Painted spurfowl Galloperdix lunulata
- Sri Lanka spurfowl Galloperdix bicalcarata
