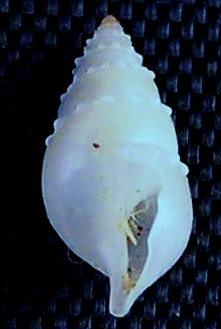
- Shell of Eubela distincta

Scientific classification
- Kingdom: Animalia
- Phylum: Mollusca
- Class: Gastropoda
- Subclass: Caenogastropoda
- Order: Neogastropoda
- Superfamily: Conoidea
- Family: Raphitomidae
- Genus: Eubela
- Species: E. distincta

Binomial name
- Eubela distincta Thiele, 1925

= Eubela distincta =

Species of gastropod

Eubela distincta is a species of sea snail, a marine gastropod mollusk in the family Raphitomidae.
