= Eubela calyx =

Scientific classification
- Kingdom: Animalia
- Phylum: Mollusca
- Class: Gastropoda
- Subclass: Caenogastropoda
- Order: Neogastropoda
- Superfamily: Conoidea
- Family: Raphitomidae
- Genus: Eubela
- Species: E. calyx

Binomial name
- Eubela calyx (Dall, 1889)

Synonyms
- Daphnella (Eubela) calyx (Dall, 1889); Mangilia calyx Dall, 1889

Species of gastropod

Eubela calyx is a species of sea snail, a marine gastropod mollusk in the family Raphitomidae.

== Description ==
The length of the shell attains 5 mm.

(Original description) The shell is decollate and with the aperture imperfect, having evidently the general form of Eubela limacina, but with a slightly more differentiated siphonal canal. The surface is smooth, polished, with a distinct suture in front of which the fasciole appears as a narrow raised band, with an incised line in front of it and marking its edge. The only other sculpture consists of six or seven sharply incised lines on the siphonal canal near its anterior end . The whorls and the base are full and rounded. The incremental lines are visible but faint. The color of the shell is yellowish white with about ten spiral bands of alternate whitish and reddish brown rectangles on the body whorl arranged like the squares on a checkerboard, except that, the white rectangles being longer than the brown ones and the latter being symmetrically arranged. The angles of the brown rectangles in one line do not generally connect with those of the lines in front and behind it. On the curve of the base the rectangles are drawn somewhat lozenge-shaped.

This specimen is but a fragment, yet its characters are so remarkable that a much smaller fragment would be recognizable at once, so the author decided to name it.

== Distribution ==
This marine species was found at a depth of 227 m off Cape Hatteras, North Carolina, USA.
