= Eubela aequatorialis =

Scientific classification
- Kingdom: Animalia
- Phylum: Mollusca
- Class: Gastropoda
- Subclass: Caenogastropoda
- Order: Neogastropoda
- Superfamily: Conoidea
- Family: Raphitomidae
- Genus: Eubela
- Species: E. aequatorialis

Binomial name
- Eubela aequatorialis Thiele, 1925

Species of gastropod

Eubela aequatorialis is a species of sea snail, a marine gastropod mollusk in the family Raphitomidae.

== Distribution ==
This marine species occurs off Northeast Sumatra at a depth of 750 m.
