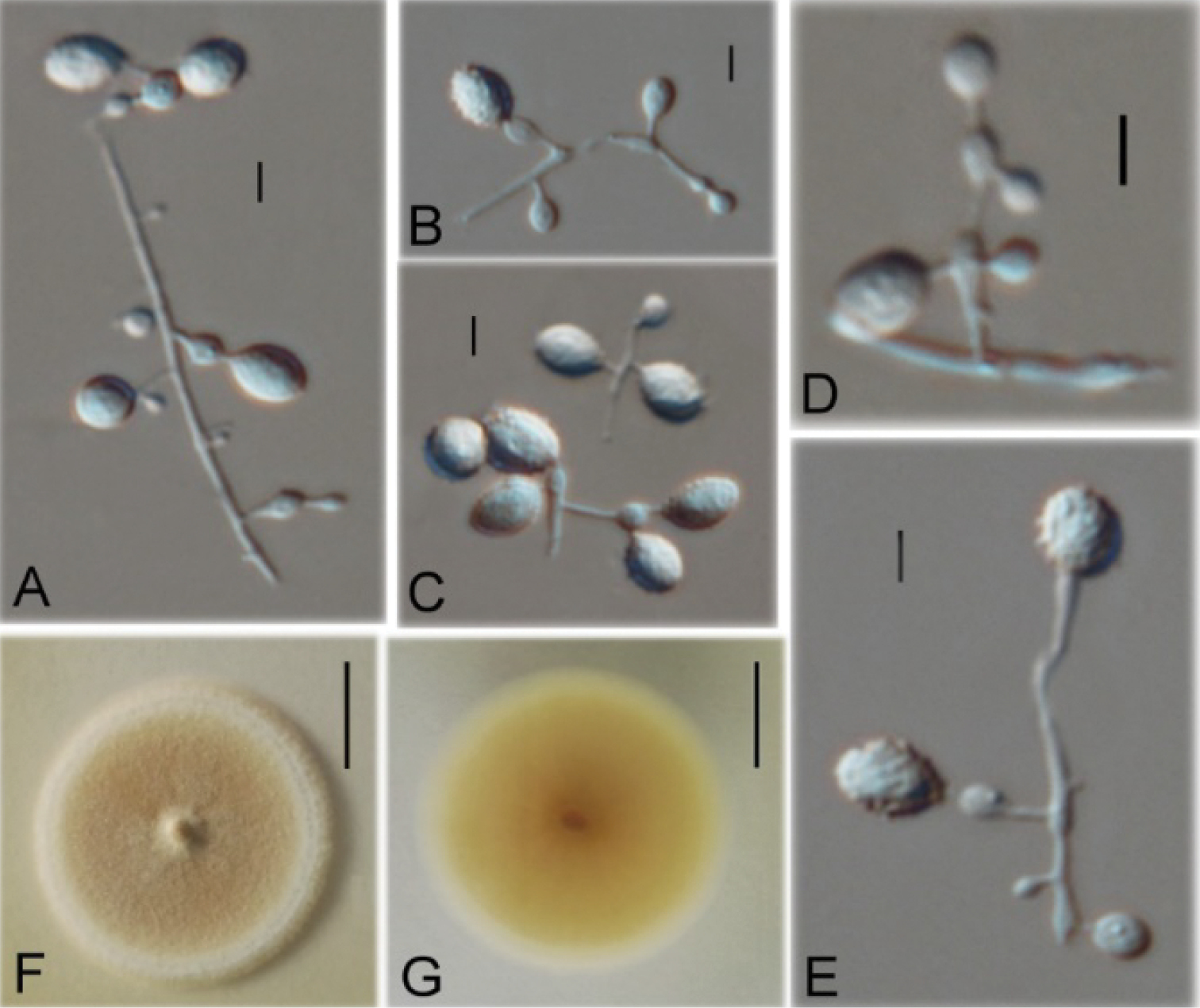
- C. serratus: A–E Conidiogenous structures and conidia. F, G Colony on PDA at day 14. Scale bars: 10 µm (A–E); 10 mm (F, G).

Scientific classification
- Kingdom: Fungi
- Division: Ascomycota
- Class: Eurotiomycetes
- Order: Onygenales
- Family: Arthrodermataceae
- Genus: Ctenomyces
- Species: C. serratus

Binomial name
- Ctenomyces serratus Eidam (1880)

Synonyms
- Chrysosporium serratum Zeszyty Dominik (1968)

= Ctenomyces serratus =

Species of fungus

Ctenomyces serratus is a keratinophilic fungal soil saprotroph classified by the German mycologist, Michael Emil Eduard Eidam in 1880, who found it growing on an old decayed feather. Many accounts have shown that it has a global distribution, having been isolated in select soils as well as on feathers and other substrates with high keratin content. It has also been found in indoor dust of hospitals and houses in Kanpur, Northern India and as a common keratinophilic soil fungus in Germany. This species has been associated with toenail infections in humans and skin ulcers in guinea pigs.

== History and taxonomy ==
Ctenomyces serratus was first discovered on a rotten, old feather by Eidam in 1880. When discovering it, Eidam observed different structures and assumed he was looking at different stages of growth of the fungus. However, in 1956 Benjamin revealed that Eidam's observations unintentionally included a species of Arthroderma. The fungus is a member of the family of Onygenaceae. The etymology of the species epithet "serratus" is derived from the Latin serra which means "saw" due to the saw-tooth appearance of peridial appendages.

== Structural appearance and physiology ==
Its ascomata are orange-brown, rounded and measure approximately 100–350 μm in diameter, exclusive of its appendages. Its asci are hyaline and rounded, containing 8 lens-shaped, orange, ascospores, 7 μm in diameter. In addition, their peridial appendages are pale-orange and have a membranous inner layer with an outer layer of orange-brown, septate, thick-walled and prickly hyphae that form a highly ramified mesh-like peridium with anastamosing connections. With its teleomorphic stages being more commonly found, its anamorph state is absent or rare, having large amounts of arthroconidia. The conidial state has been treated in the form-genus, Chrysosporium. C. serratus is generally regarded to be heterothallic, only forming the sexual state when crossed with the compatible mating type; however, the possibility has been raised that it may in fact be homothallic. Notably, its appendages are roughened, tooth-like and between 100–150 μm in length with 5–11 cells. Growth is reliant on nitrogen sources that include the L configurations of the amino acids alanine, isoleucine, methionine, tyrosine and glycine. This species prefers neutral to slightly alkaline conditions. It can utilize fructose and is dependent on external sources of the B-vitamin, thiamine. One comparative study showed that its growth is only supported in amino acid mixtures and casein protein media. There has been suggestion that C. serratus may be able to fix atmospheric nitrogen. Commonly used fungicides are active against this species, including: Benlate, Calix and Saprol.

== Habitat and distribution ==
Localities where C. serratus has been isolated

Ctenomyces serratus is world-wide in distribution and shows some degree of habitat overlap with other keratinophilic fungi in the families, Arthrodermataceae and Onygenaceae, due perhaps in part to its spread across political borders on feathered hosts. Literature reports document this species from 19 countries worldwide, with most specimens found in select soils, birds nests and animal excrements. A single case of its appearance in turkeys has been found as well.

With most of its growth being on shed feathers due to its keratinophilic nature, this fungal species tends to grow wherever its host happens to lay shed feathers. Because of its strong association with migratory birds, its distribution includes a large variety of countries. For example, C. serratus has been found in hospitals and rooms in Northern India, in soil samples in Berlin and on hooves and horns in goats and sheep in Egypt.

== Human and animal health implications ==
Ctenomyces serratus is not considered pathogenic to humans; however, skin lesions and inhibited hair growth have been found in guinea pigs while it can be an etiological agent in nail infections. In addition, a novel kappa opioid receptor binding inhibitor has been extracted from it. Its relevance to human health is based on Kappa opioid receptors, when highly activated, having negative effects that mimic those of depression, drug-seeking behaviour, and drug craving. As such, extracts of such inhibitory agents hold promise as potential sources of treatment for addressing drug-related dependence and addictions. This is mainly because these receptors are implicated in reward systems that lie at the root of addiction-related disorders.
