= Eubela monile =

Scientific classification
- Kingdom: Animalia
- Phylum: Mollusca
- Class: Gastropoda
- Subclass: Caenogastropoda
- Order: Neogastropoda
- Superfamily: Conoidea
- Family: Raphitomidae
- Genus: Eubela
- Species: E. monile

Binomial name
- Eubela monile Marwick, 1931

Extinct species of gastropod

Eubela monile is an extinct species of sea snail, a marine gastropod mollusk in the family Raphitomidae.

== Distribution ==
Fossils of this species were found in New Zealand.
