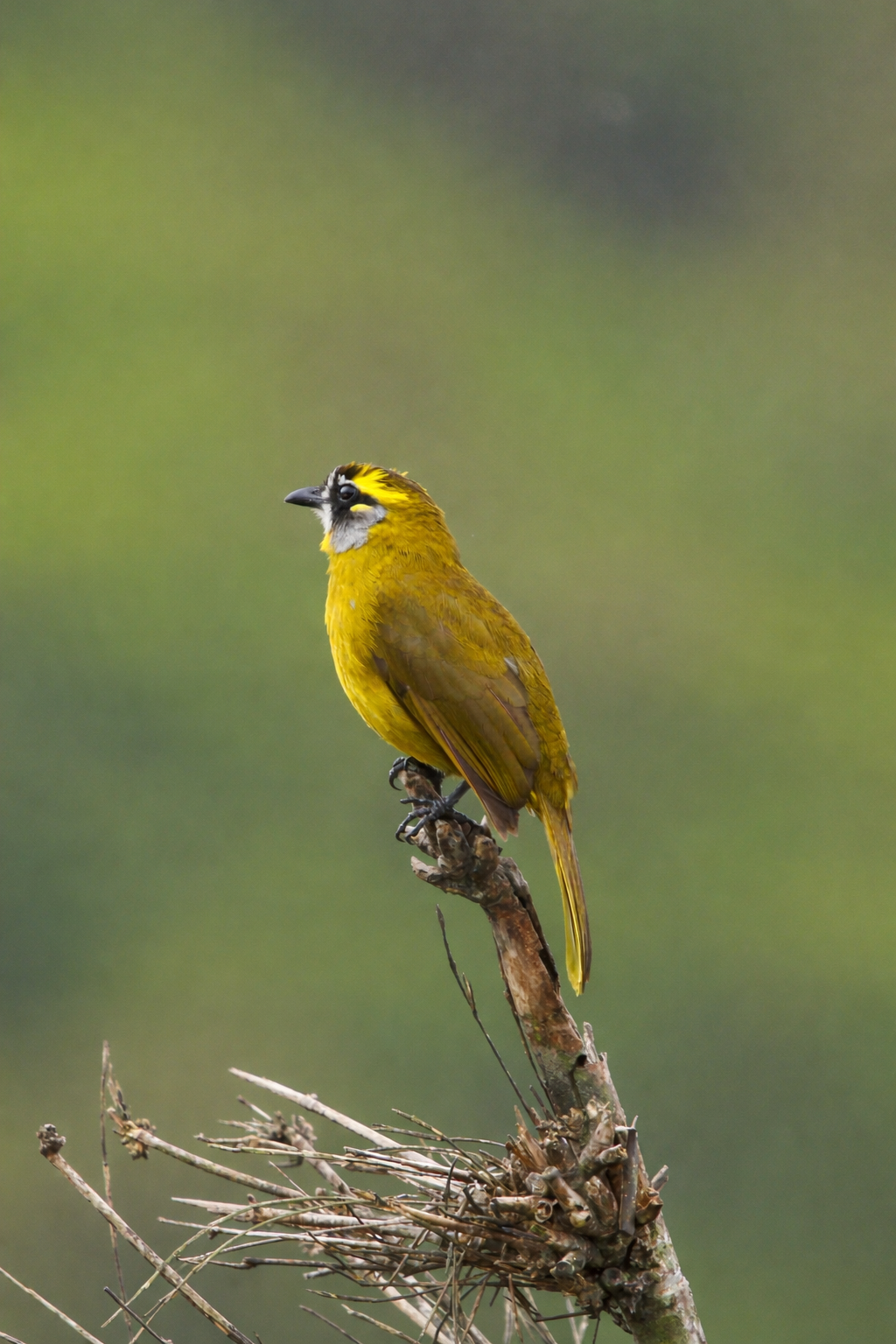

Conservation status
- Least Concern (IUCN 3.1)

Scientific classification
- Kingdom: Animalia
- Phylum: Chordata
- Class: Aves
- Order: Passeriformes
- Family: Pycnonotidae
- Genus: Pycnonotus
- Species: P. penicillatus

Binomial name
- Pycnonotus penicillatus Blyth, 1851
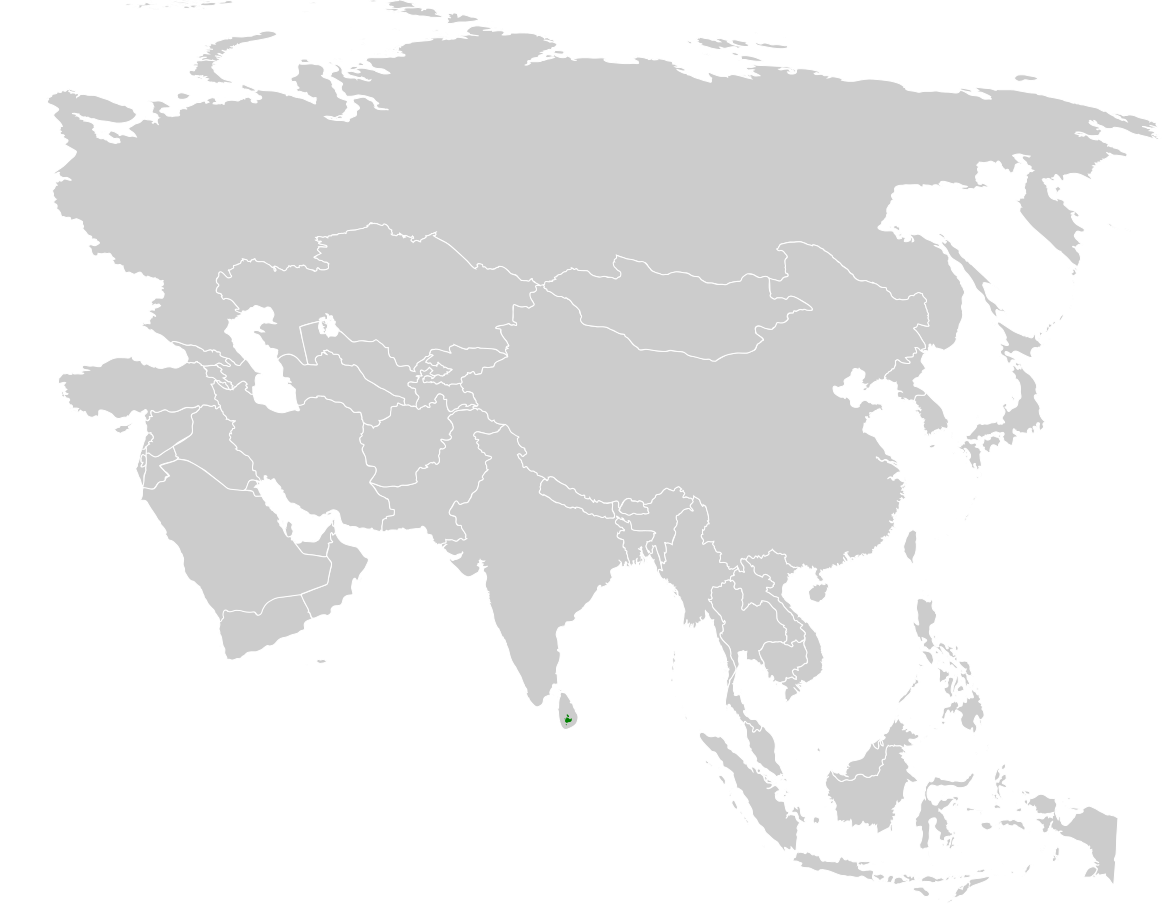

Synonyms
- Kelaartia penicillata; Pycnonotus penicillata

= Yellow-eared bulbul =

Species of bird

The yellow-eared bulbul (Pycnonotus penicillatus) is a species of songbird in the bulbul family of passerine birds. It is an endemic resident breeder in the highlands of Sri Lanka. The common name is also used as an alternate name for the yellow-throated bulbul.

== Taxonomy and systematics ==
The yellow-eared bulbul was formerly classified in the monotypic genus Kelaartia, named after Dr. E.F. Kelaart. Alternate names for the yellow-eared bulbul include the Ceylon bulbul, Sri Lanka bulbul and yellow-tufted bulbul.

== Distribution and habitat ==
The yellow eared-bulbul is endemic to Sri Lanka and is the least common of the bulbuls found in Sri Lanka. This is a bird of jungle and wooded farmland. Despite its restricted range, it is quite readily found at sites such as Horton Plains, Piduruthalagala peak, Moonplains and Victoria Park in Nuwara Eliya and has been frequently sighted in rocky hills.

== Description ==
The yellow-eared bulbul is about 20 cm (7.9 in) in length, with a long tail. It has olive upperparts and yellowish underparts. The crown of the head is grey, and there are yellow ear tufts and a yellow patch below the eye. There is a white tuft in front of the eye and the throat is also white.

Sexes are similar in plumage, but young birds are duller than adults. The flight is bouncing and woodpecker-like.

== Behaviour and ecology ==
Yellow-eared bulbuls build their nest in a bush with two eggs in a typical clutch. They feed on fruit and insects. Nests are open and cup-shaped. Material such as roots and lichen are used in building the nests. Breeding season usually occurs around February-May and again during August-October.

== Cultural references ==
The yellow-eared bulbul appears on the 10-rupee Sri Lankan postage stamp and can also be seen on the new LKR රු5000 note of Sri Lanka.

== Gallery ==
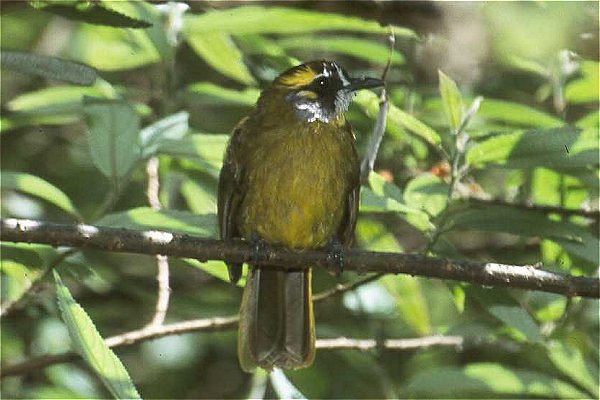
Yellow-eared bulbul

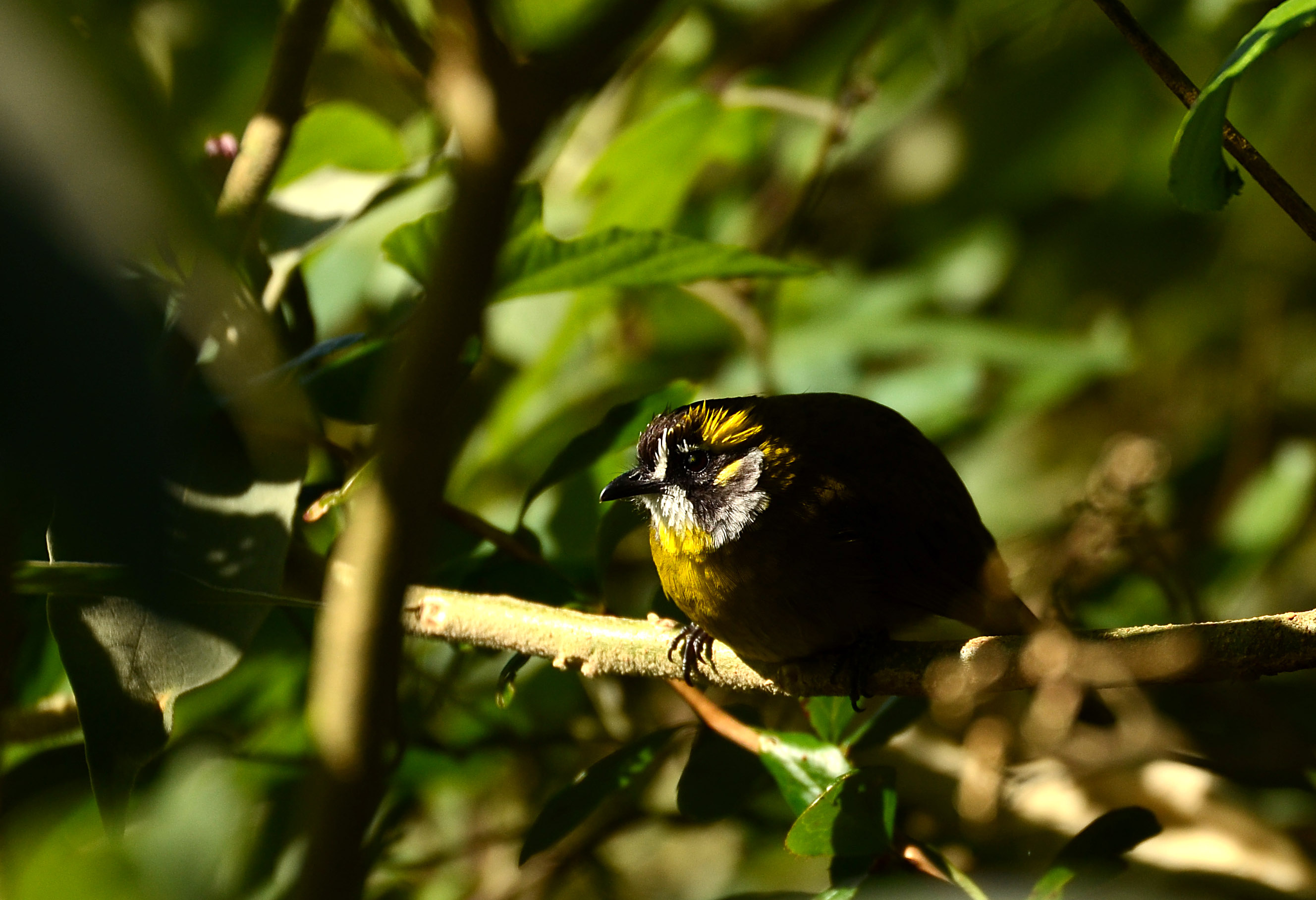
Yellow-eared bulbul Sri Lanka

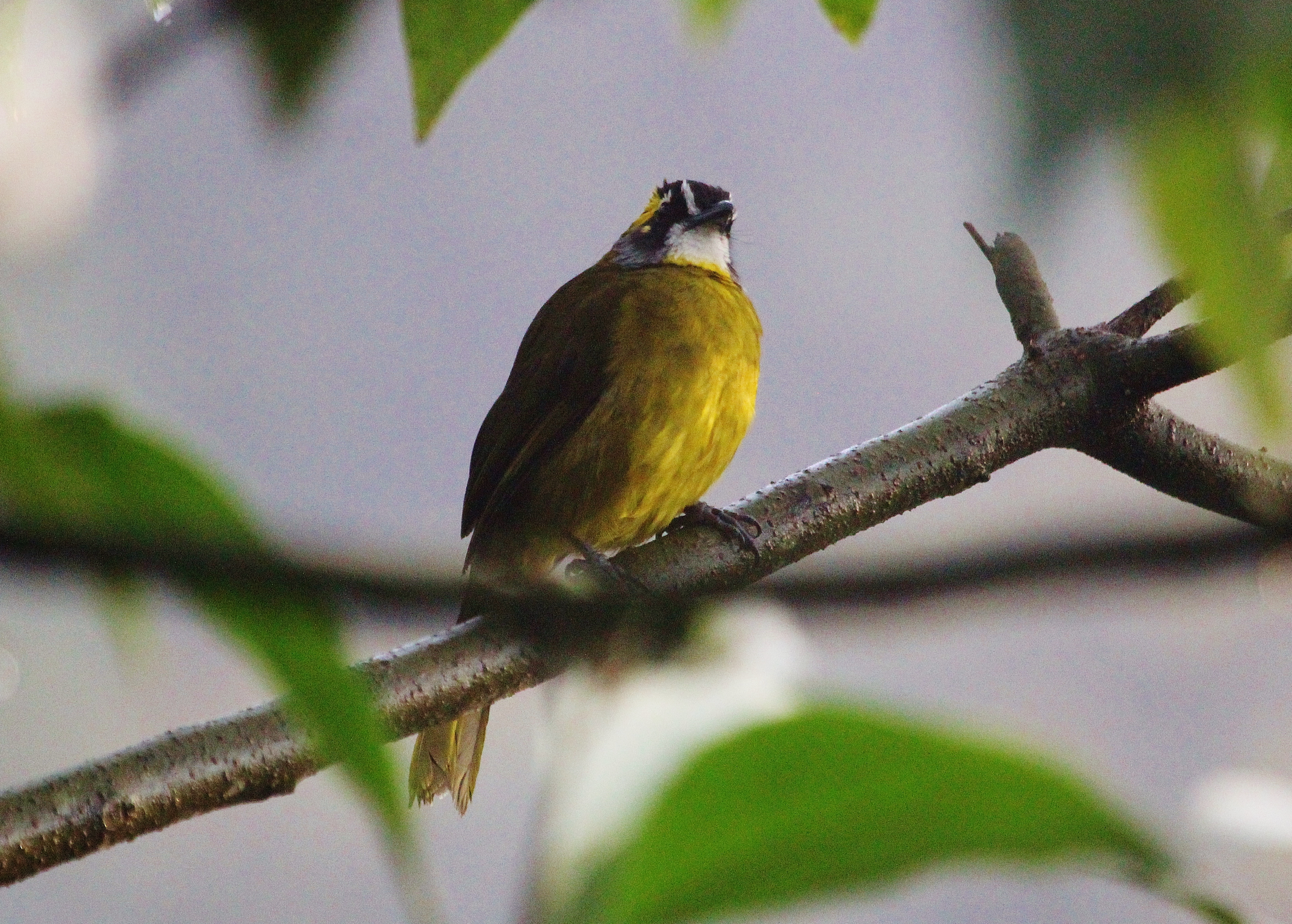
A yellow-eared bulbul in the town of Embilipitiya, Sri Lanka

at Nuwara Eliya
