= CALYX =

American non-profit publisher

CALYX, Inc. is a non-profit publisher of art and literature by women founded in 1976 based in Corvallis, Oregon. CALYX publishes both CALYX, A Journal of Art and Literature by Women twice a year and CALYX Books, which publishes one to three books annually. CALYX is one of the nation's oldest feminist presses.

CALYX uses a collective model to make its editorial decisions. Several volunteer editors review and edit an author's work and often work with authors to improve their pieces. All manuscripts are read by a minimum of two editors. Manuscripts held for further consideration are read by all of the editors. CALYX Journal usually receives 1,000 submissions annually from women across the United States and internationally during their reading period, October 1-December 31.

== Mission statement ==
The CALYX mission statement is to introduce a wide audience to high quality literature and art by women, provide a forum for diversity and underrepresented writers and viewpoints, discover and publish emerging and developing writers, and preserve publications for future audiences.

CALYX achieves its mission statement by publishing work which represents the voices of marginalized groups. In past books and journals, these groups have included women of color, queer women, young and old women, and women of diverse economic, religious, educational, and cultural backgrounds.

== Awards ==
CALYX is the recipient of numerous awards, including: an American Library Association GLBT Fiction Award Finalist, a Pushcart Prize, Bumbershoot Book Fair Best Literary Journal Award (three times), the Oregon Governor's Arts Award, The American Literary Journal Award (three times), The CSWS Oregon Women of Extraordinary Achievement Award, the OSU Friends of the Library Achievement Award, the Pacific Northwest Booksellers Book Award, the PEN West Non-Fiction Award Finalist, The Stewart H. Holbrook Award from the Oregon Institute of Literary Arts, the American Book Award for the Forbidden Stitch, the Coordinating Council of Literary Magazines Award for Excellence (twice), the Bumbershoot Small Press Best Cover (twice), and the Best Offset Book Design, as well as others.

== Authors ==
Since 1976, CALYX has published the work of over 4,000 women artists and authors. CALYX has published many important women authors first or early in their careers including Julia Alvarez, Ellen Bass, Chitra Divakaruni, Molly Gloss, Linda Hogan, Natalie Goldberg, Barbara Kingsolver, Colleen McElroy, Sharon Olds, Nobel Laureate Wislawa Szymborska (the first English translations in the U.S.A.), and Eleanor Wilner, among others. CALYX Journal was also the first U.S. publisher of color art reproductions of the work of the Mexican artist Frida Kahlo.
