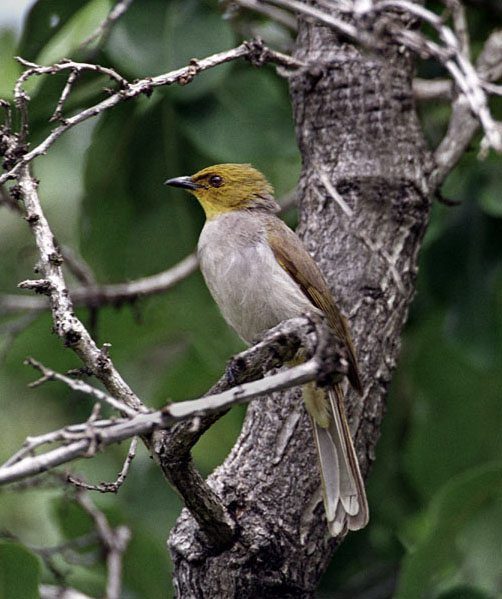

Conservation status
- Least Concern (IUCN 3.1)

Scientific classification
- Kingdom: Animalia
- Phylum: Chordata
- Class: Aves
- Order: Passeriformes
- Family: Pycnonotidae
- Genus: Pycnonotus
- Species: P. xantholaemus

Binomial name
- Pycnonotus xantholaemus (Jerdon, 1845)
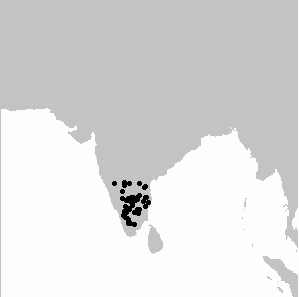

Synonyms
- Brachypus xantholaemus; Ixos xantholaemus

= Yellow-throated bulbul =

Species of songbird

The yellow-throated bulbul (Pycnonotus xantholaemus) is a species of songbird in the bulbul family of passerine birds. The species is endemic to southern peninsular India. They are found on scrub habitats on steep, rocky hills many of which are threatened by granite quarrying. It is confusable only with the white-browed bulbul with which its range overlaps but is distinctively yellow on the head and throat apart from the yellow vent. The calls of this species are very similar to that of the white-browed bulbul.

== Taxonomy and systematics ==
The yellow-throated bulbul was originally described by Thomas Jerdon in the genus Brachypus (a synonym for Pycnonotus), and later re-classified it in the genus Ixos. It has since been re-classified to the genus Pycnonotus. The alternate name yellow-eared bulbul should not be confused with the species of that name, Pycnonotus penicillatus. The name 'yellow-throated bulbul' is also used as an alternate name for Falkenstein's greenbul.

== Description ==
This uncrested species of bulbul is olive grey above with a yellow throat, undertail coverts and tail tips. The head is plain while the breast and belly have a grey wash. The closest resembling species is the white-browed bulbul but this has a supercilium and lacks the yellow throat. Males and females are similar in plumage.

== Distribution and habitat ==
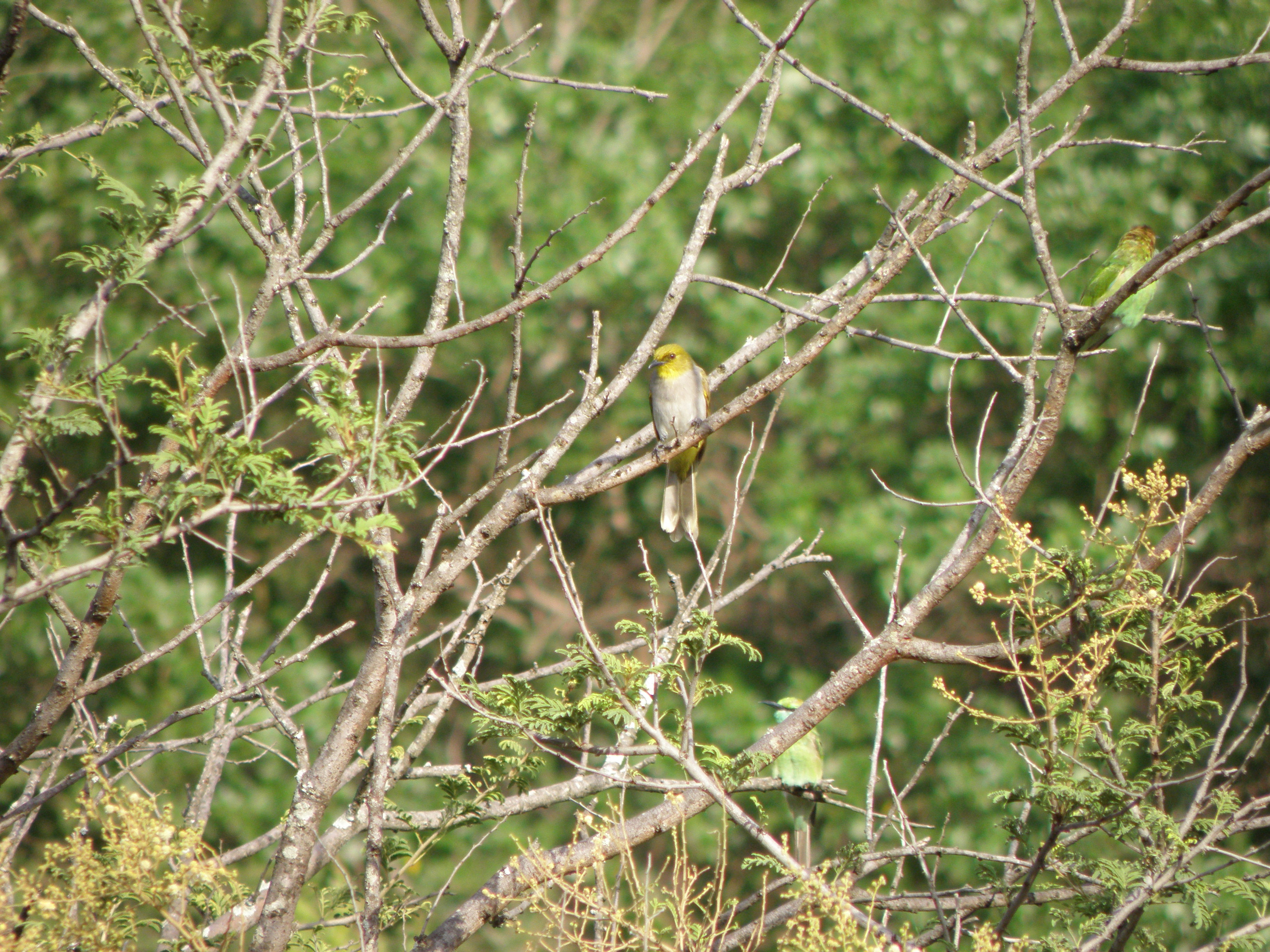
In scrub habitat

Yellow-throated bulbul call from Gingee Fort

The habitat of the species is rocky, scrub-covered hills mostly in the Eastern Ghats and central peninsular India but also in some places in the Western Ghats. The distribution is highly fragmented and populations are very local, making hilly habitats a very special conservation concern. Many of these hill forests are threatened by granite quarrying, forest fires and grazing. It has vanished from many sites where it was earlier known.

Some well-known locations include the Nandi Hills, Horsley Hills, Gingee, Yercaud and the Biligirirangans. The species is also seen in some parts of the Western Ghats including the Anamalais. The northern limit is believed to be in the Nallamala range, but it is suspected that the species may extend in range into the northern Eastern Ghats of Orissa.

== Behaviour and ecology ==
This bird is usually shy and hidden within scrub and is usually detected by its sudden cackling outbursts of calls, which are similar to those of the white-browed bulbul. They feed on insects and the berries of various scrub plant species including Lantana camara, Flueggea leucopyrus, Toddalia asiatica, Erythroxylon monogynum, Solanum indicum, Santalum album, Ziziphus, Ficus benghalensis, Ficus nervosa, Ficus montana, Canthium dicoccum and Phyllanthus reticulata.

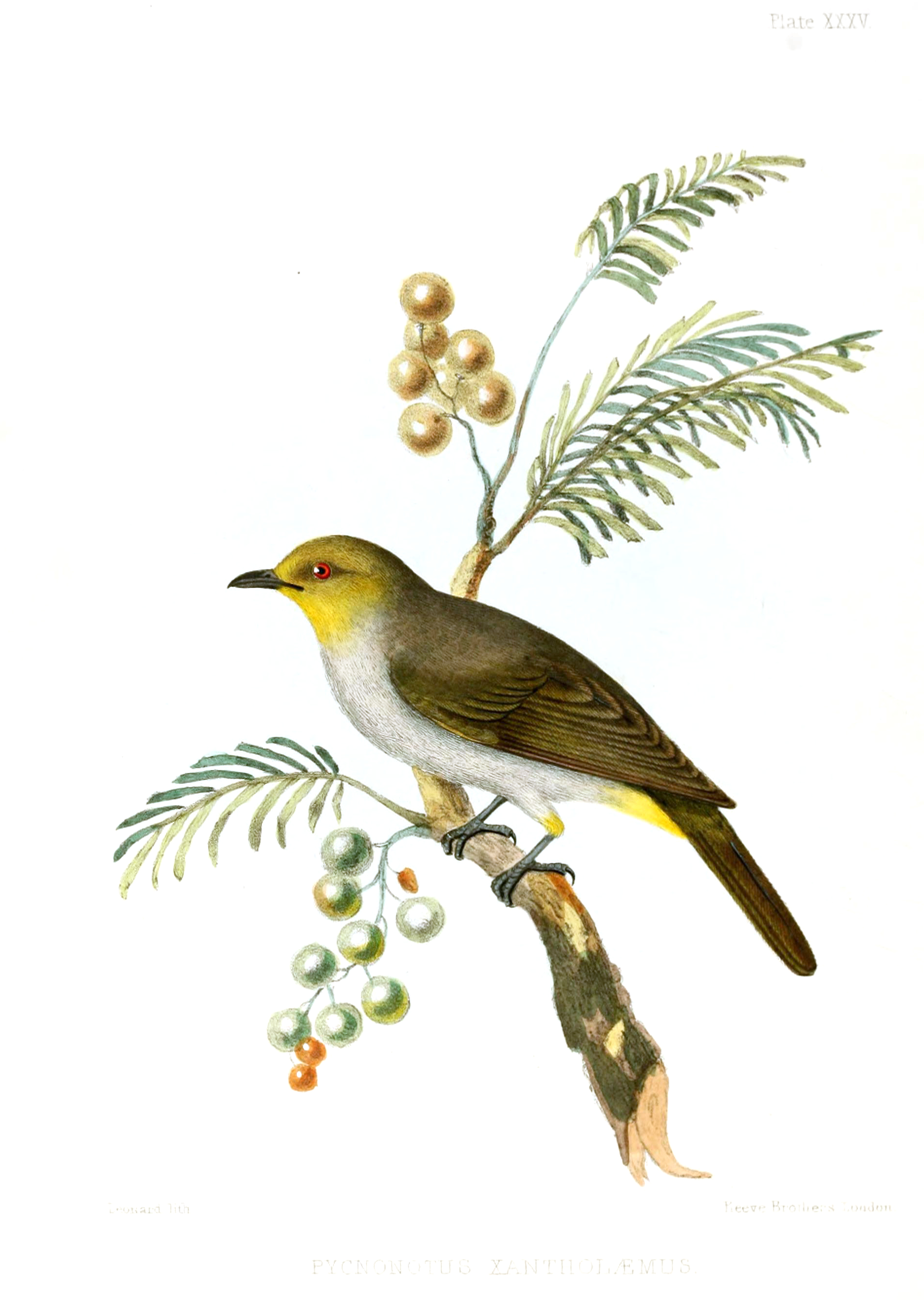
1847 illustration

During hot afternoons and in the dry-season they visit pools of water both to drink and bathe.

The breeding season is June to August. The nest is built in the fork of a small tree. Two eggs are laid which hatch in 20 days with the chicks fledging 13 days later.
