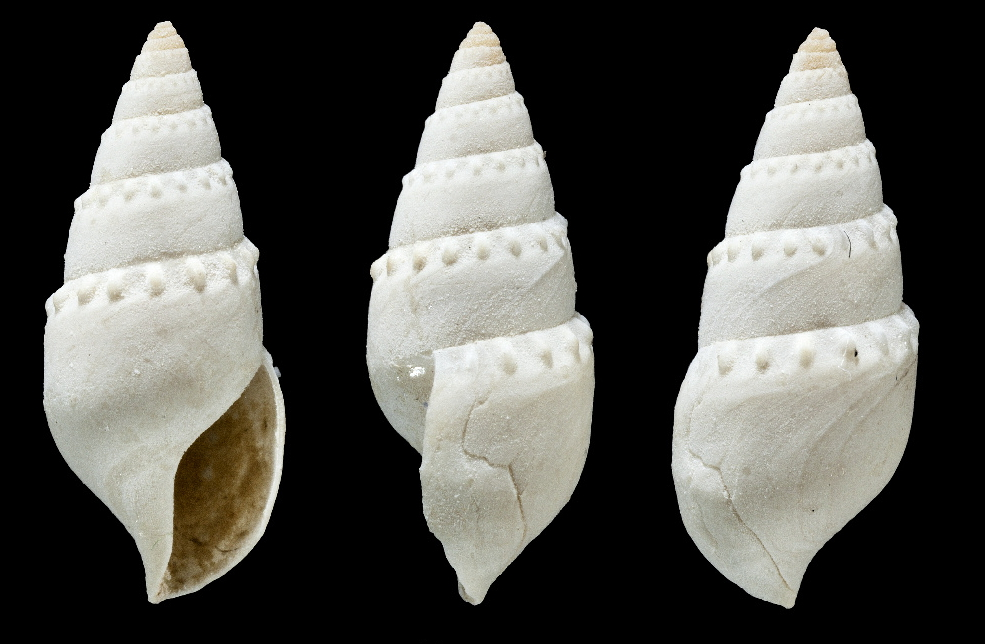
- Shell of Eubela limacina (specimen at Natural History Museum, London)

Scientific classification
- Kingdom: Animalia
- Phylum: Mollusca
- Class: Gastropoda
- Subclass: Caenogastropoda
- Order: Neogastropoda
- Superfamily: Conoidea
- Family: Raphitomidae
- Genus: Eubela
- Species: E. limacina

Binomial name
- Eubela limacina (Dall, 1881)

Synonyms
- Clathurella hormophora Watson, 1885; Daphnella limacina (Dall, 1881); Daphnella limacina Verrill, 1884; Pleurotoma (Bela) limacina Dall, 1881; Pleurotoma [Defrancia) hormophora Watson, 1881

= Eubela limacina =

Species of gastropod

Eubela limacina is a species of sea snail, a marine gastropod mollusk in the family Raphitomidae.

== Description ==
The length of the shell varies between 8 mm and 12 mm.

(Original description) The waxy white shell is smooth, glistening, elongated, rather acute at both extremities. It contains eight or nine whorls, the whorls of the protoconch are less strongly sculptured.

Next the suture, which is by them distinctly marked, a succession follows of (on the body whorl sixteen) little squarish knobs, not continued anteriorly in any way, but looking as if they had been pinched on from the interspaces between them. On the back of the siphonal canal are two or three spiral threads, remainder of a shell without trace of spiral sculpture .

The lines of growth are very flexuous, indicating a deep broad emargination near the suture. But the shell is so excessively thin and brittle that the author can find, among many specimens, none with a perfect aperture, but supposes from the growth lines that the outer lip was rounded out broadly, while the siphonal canal is very narrow.

The columella is extremely thin, sharp and straight, making the aperture narrowly lunate. There are variations in slenderness and in the prominence of the sutural knobs. Otherwise this is one of the most characteristic abyssal species and wholly unlike any of the shallow-water Belas. The body whorl measure twenty-seveu forty-fourths of the length of the shell.

== Distribution ==
E. limacina can be found in Atlantic waters, ranging from the coast of New Jersey south to Brazil at depths between 155 m to 1472 m<.: in the Caribbean Sea off Guadeloupe.
