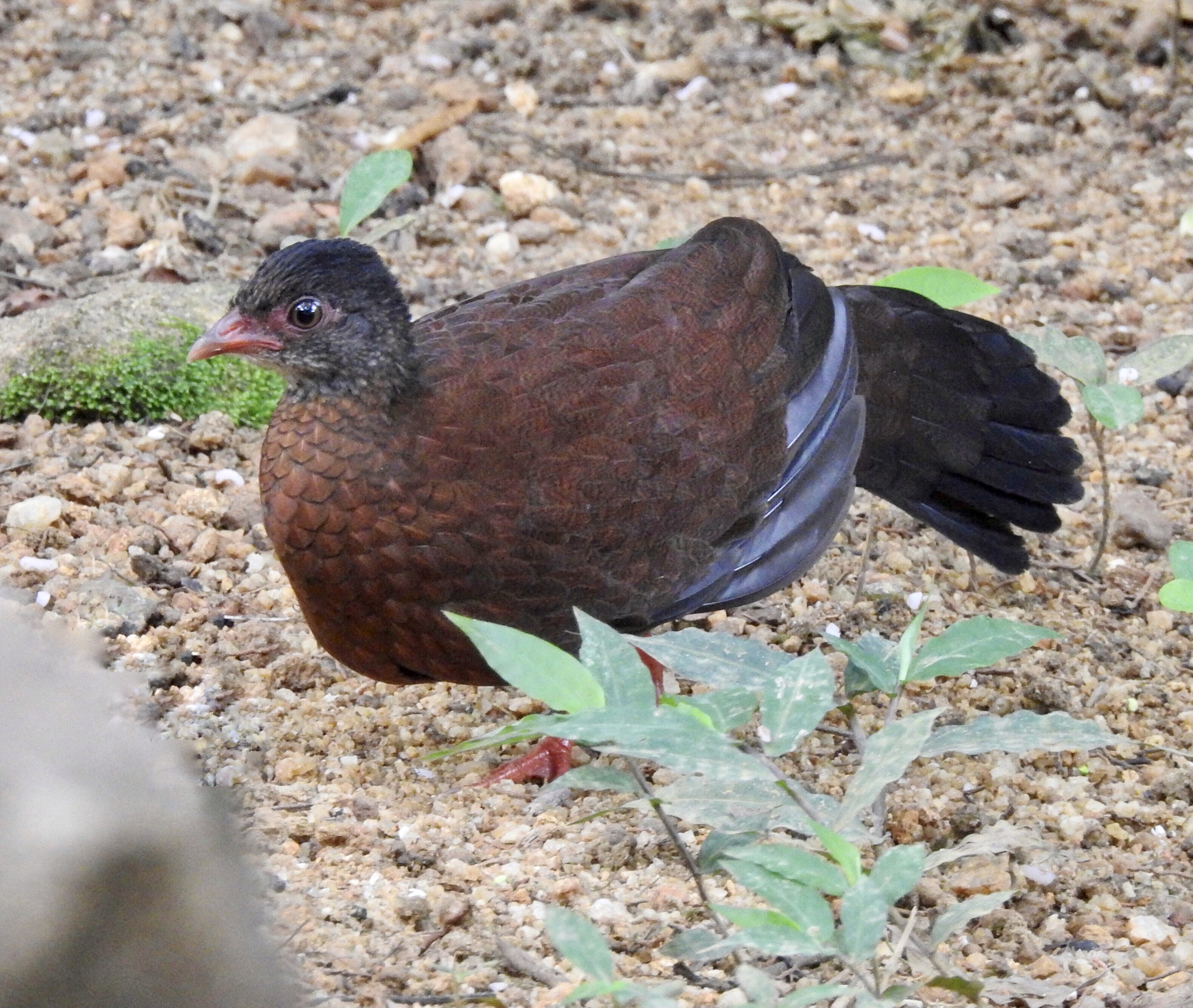

Conservation status
- Least Concern (IUCN 3.1)

Scientific classification
- Kingdom: Animalia
- Phylum: Chordata
- Class: Aves
- Order: Galliformes
- Family: Phasianidae
- Genus: Galloperdix
- Species: G. bicalcarata

Binomial name
- Galloperdix bicalcarata (Forster, 1781)
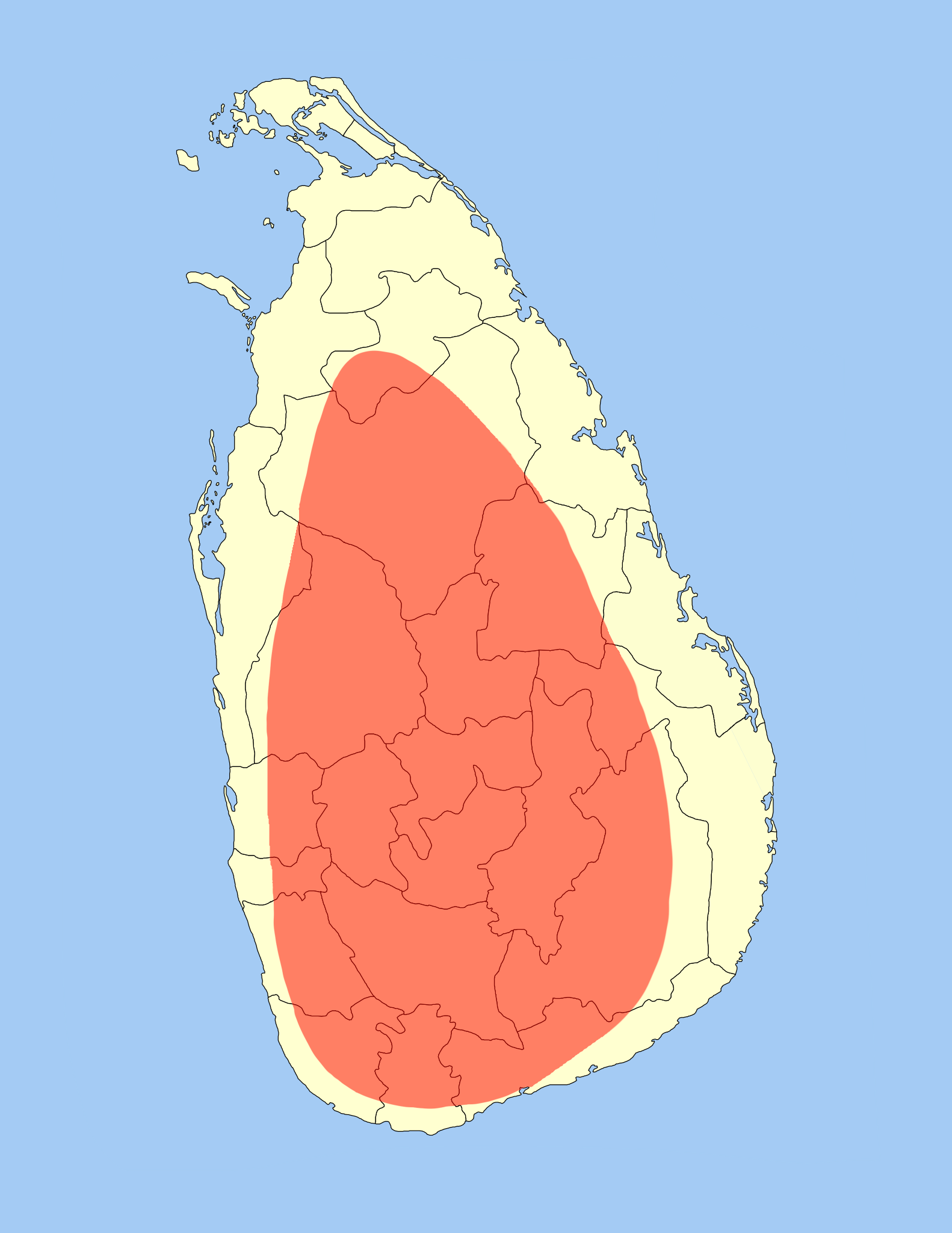

= Sri Lanka spurfowl =

Species of bird

The Sri Lanka spurfowl (Galloperdix bicalcarata) is a member of the pheasant family which is endemic to the dense rainforests of Sri Lanka. In Sri Lanka, this bird is known as haban kukula - හබන් කුකුලා in Sinhala.

It is a very secretive bird, and despite its size is difficult to see as it slips through dense undergrowth. Often the only indication of its presence is its distinctive ringing call, consisting of series of three-syllabled whistles. Kitulgala and Sinharaja are sites where there is a chance of seeing this bird.

This spurfowl is one of three species of bird in the genus Galloperdix. It is a ground nesting bird, which lays 2-5 eggs in a scrape.

Sri Lanka spurfowl is ~ 37 cm long bird. Both sexes have brown upperparts, wings and tail.

The males exhibit vivid crimson red legs and bare facial skin and striking black and white dorsal plumage that extends to its head. There is also extensive white ocellation on the sepia wings and upperback.

The legs of both sexes have multiple metatarsal spurs, which give rise to the specific name. The female has chestnut underparts and a plain brown back and wings. She is more prominently crested than the male.

Sri Lanka spurfowl is a seasonally terrestrial species, like most of its near relatives. It scratches vigorously amongst the leaf litter of the forest floor for invertebrates, especially mollusks and insects. It will also take various seeds, fallen fruit and spiders.

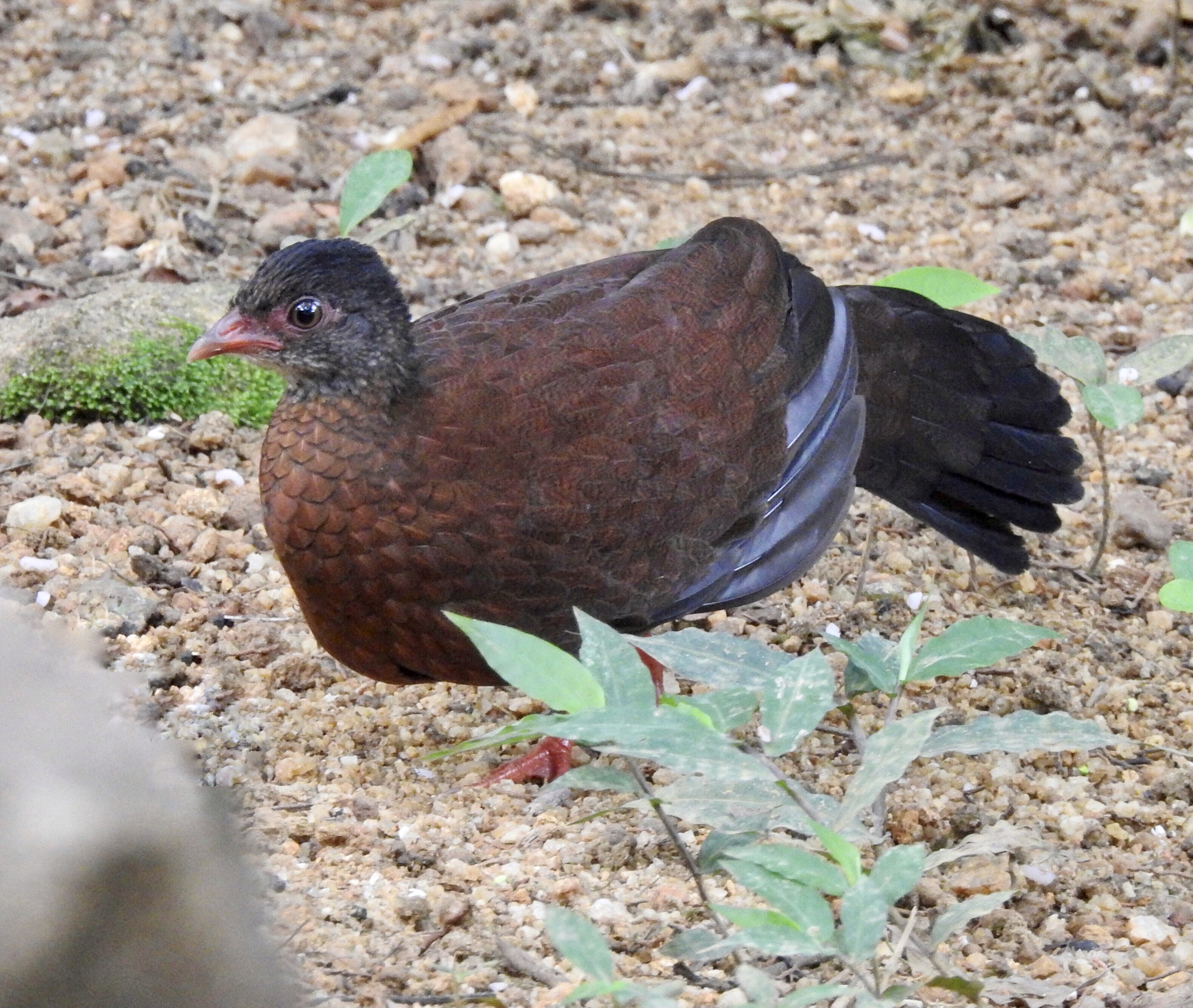
Female

== In culture ==
This spurfowl appears in a one rupee Sri Lankan postal stamp.
