= Carmen Meléndez de Cálix =

Honduran politician

Member of the National Congress
- In office 1957–

Carmen Meléndez de Cálix was a Honduran politician. In 1957 she was elected to the Constituent Assembly, becoming one of the first female deputies in Honduras.

== Biography ==
A prominent member of the National Party in Atlántida Department, Meléndez was nominated as a candidate by the party for the 1957 Constituent Assembly elections. She was one three women elected, becoming the first female deputies in Honduras.
