= Calix Limited =

Australian technology company

- Industry: Commercialising industrial decarbonisation and environmental solutions, research & development company, agriculture, chemicals, energy, energy storage, mining, climate change mitigation, carbon capture and storage, biotechnology, wastewater treatment, aquaculture
- Founded: 2005
- Headquarters: Pymble, Australia
- Area served: Worldwide
- Key people: Phil Hodgson (Managing Director and CEO); Mark Sceats (Chief Scientist Officer); Darren Charles (CFO)
- Products: ACTI-Mag, AQUA-Cal+, BOOSTER-Mag
- Website: www.calix.global

,

Calix Limited is an Australian technology company whose core technology is a "kiln" built in Bacchus Marsh that produces "mineral honeycomb". Calix's technology includes work on CO_{2} capture to address global sustainability challenges across several industries including wastewater treatment, aquaculture, advanced energy storage and cement / lime production.

== Products ==
Calix's products include ACTI-Mag, BOOSTER-Mag and AQUA-Cal+.

- ACTI-Mag - Wastewater management
- AQUA-Cal+ - Sustainable aquaculture farming, lake & pond remediation
- BOOSTER-Mag - Crop protection

== History ==
The origins of Calix began in 2005, with work on flash calcining. In 2007 their first pilot calciner facility was built to test what was possible with a fully established CFC 850 calciner plant at Bacchus Marsh in 2011. In 2012 Calix acquired mining tenements at Myrtle Springs, South Australia. Between 2013 and 2017 Calix established a plant in South East Asia and won several awards and funding for a variety of sustainable technologies including Advanced Battery research, and Agricultural applications. Calix listed publicly in the Australian Securities Exchange (ASX) in 2018 and in coordination with the LEILAC (Low Emissions Intensity Lime & Cement) project in Europe, began construction of a pilot plant in Lixhe, Belgium. In 2019 Calix acquired the US-based company Inland Empire Resources.

== Project LEILAC ==
Calix is a key partner in, and provides the core technology towards, Project LEILAC (Low Emissions Intensity Lime & Cement), as part of Horizon 2020, a programme established by the European Commission.

== Financial information ==
Calix Limited is a listed Australian public company, having listed on the Australian Securities Exchange (ASX) in 2018. Prior to its listing, Calix was backed by investors including Och-Ziff Capital Management Group and Washington H Soul Pattinson. Since its foundation in 2005, Calix Limited has to date committed more than $40 million to commercialising its technologies and processes.
