= Kothaimangalam Wetlands =

Wetland in Tamil Nadu, India

Kothaimangalam is located near to Palani, Tamil Nadu, India. The huge lakes are the habitat for lot of Migratory birds. One of the wetland is adjacent to the Shanmuganadhi river.

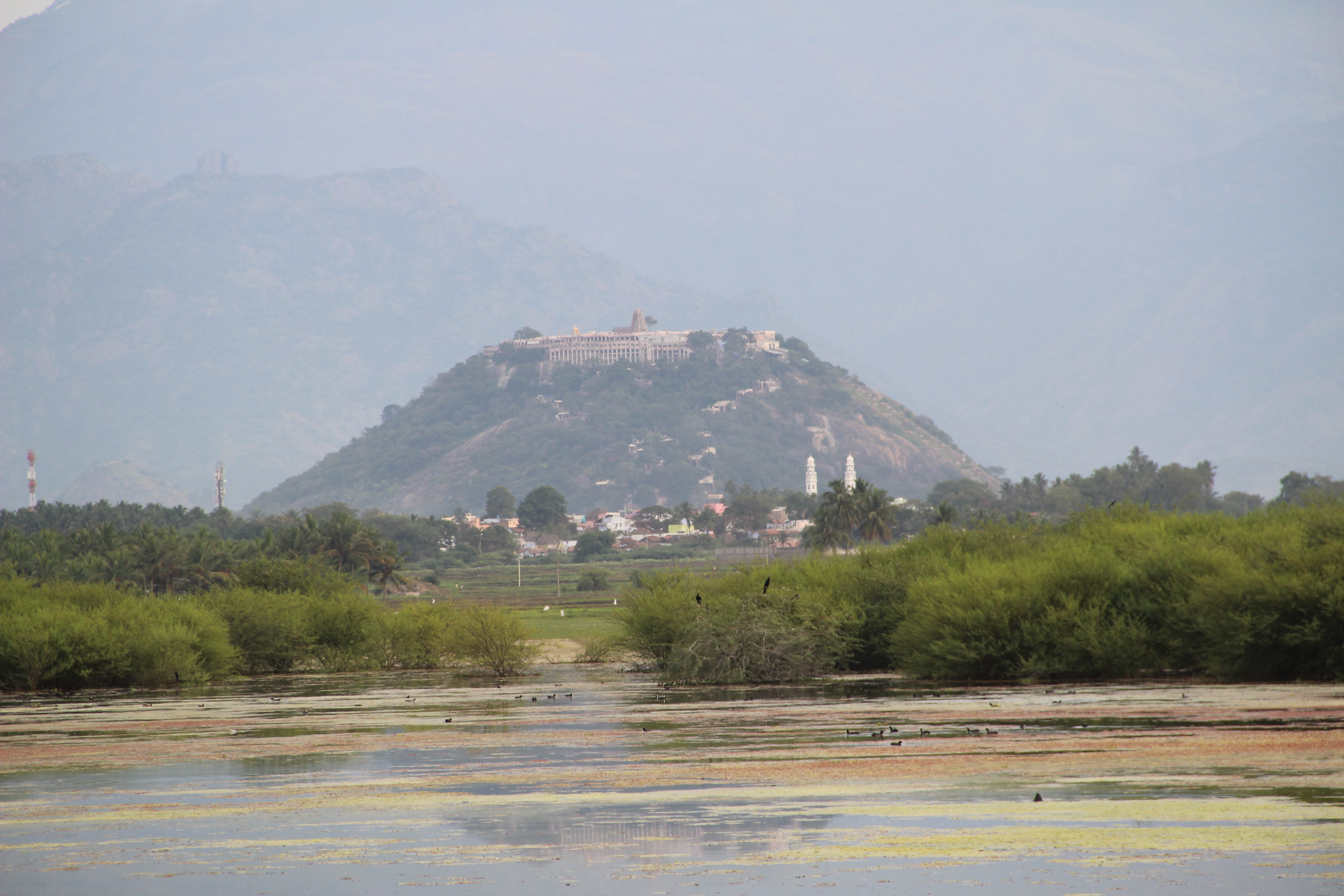
Kothaimangalam Wetland

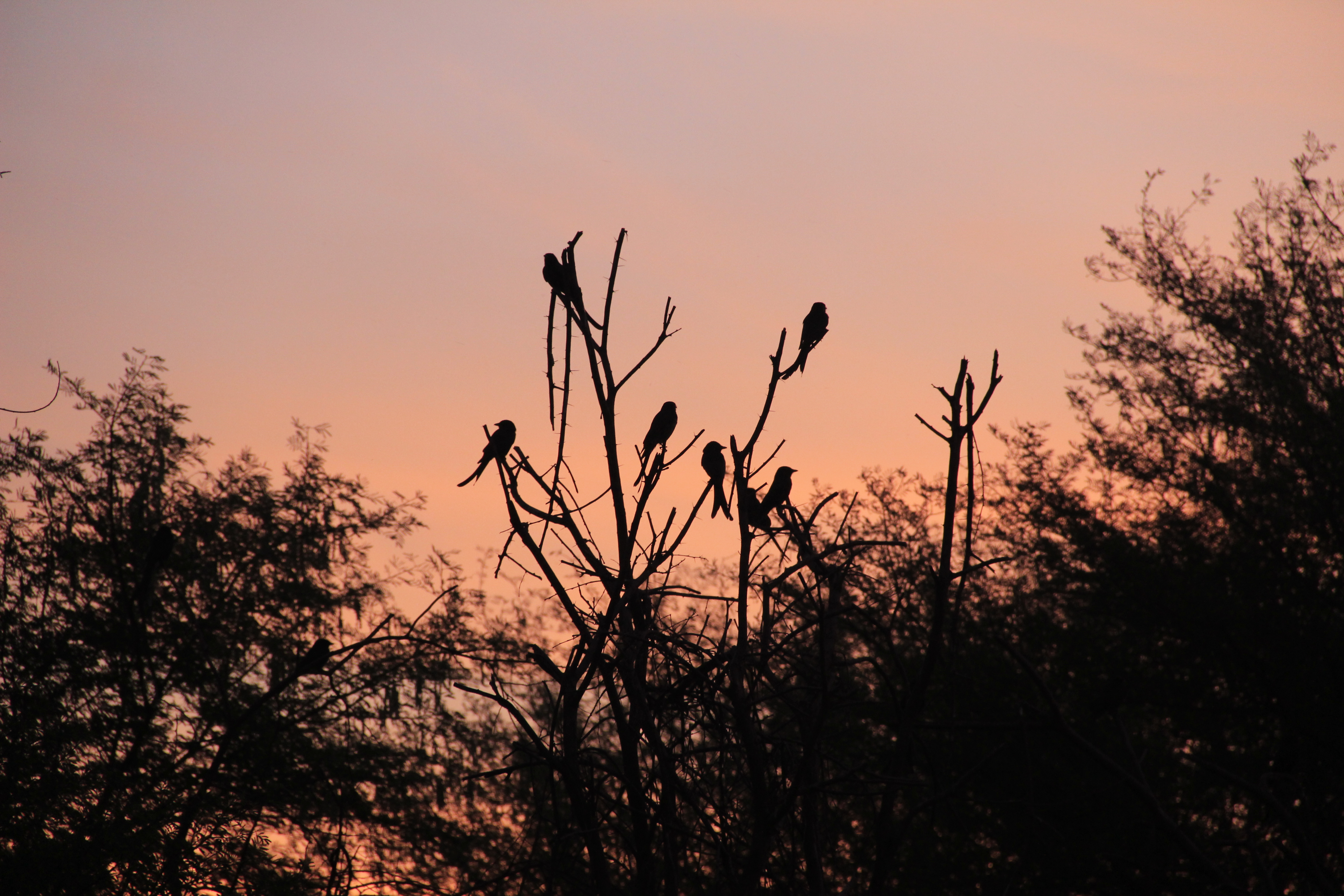
Black Drongos at Kothaimangalam Wetland

Some of the birds which can be seen here are Indian spot-billed duck, Indian peafowl, Eurasian coot, common sandpiper, pied cuckoo, Eurasian collared dove, laughing dove, Asian koel, brahminy kite, rosy starling, little cormorant, eastern cattle egret, great egret, medium egret, little egret, greater coucal, rose-ringed parakeet, white-throated kingfisher, Indian roller, ashy prinia, common myna, Indian pond heron, purple sunbird, purple-rumped sunbird, yellow-billed babbler, purple heron, white-breasted waterhen, grey-headed swamp hen, common hawk-cuckoo, Asian palm swift, red-wattled lapwing, Indian roller, black drongo, rufous treepie, common tailorbird, red-vented bulbul, painted stork, Oriental ibis, pied kingfisher, darter, little grebe, spotted owlet, common hoopoe, common moorhen, pied wagtail, grey wagtail, Asian green bee-eater, black kite, black-winged kite, blue-faced malkoha, Indian robin, white-headed babbler, common flameback, open-bill stork, grey heron, glossy ibis, rock pigeon, woolly-necked stork, and lesser whistling duck.
