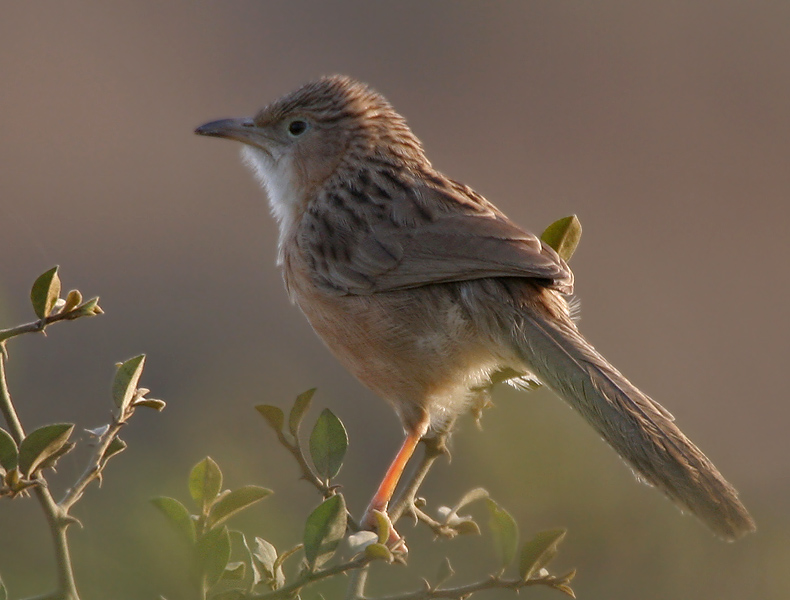
- T. c. caudata (Haryana, India)

Conservation status
- Least Concern (IUCN 3.1)

Scientific classification
- Kingdom: Animalia
- Phylum: Chordata
- Class: Aves
- Order: Passeriformes
- Family: Leiothrichidae
- Genus: Argya
- Species: A. caudata

Binomial name
- Argya caudata (Dumont, 1823)

Synonyms
- Crateropus caudatus Argya caudata Turdoides caudata

= Common babbler =

Species of bird

The common babbler (Argya caudata) is a member of the family of Leiothrichidae. They are found in dry open scrub country mainly in India. Two populations are recognized as subspecies and the populations to the west of the Indus river system are now usually treated as a separate species, the Afghan babbler (Turdoides huttoni). The species is distinctly long-tailed, slim with an overall brown or greyish colour, streaked on the upper plumage and having a distinctive whitish throat.

== Taxonomy ==
The common babbler was formerly placed in the genus Turdoides but following the publication of a comprehensive molecular phylogenetic study in 2018, it was moved to the resurrected genus Argya.

== Description ==
This small, slim babbler with a long tail is buff to grey above with dark streaks. The underside is unstreaked and paler, the throat being nearly whitish.

The species was originally described as Crateropus caudatus before it was moved to the genus Argya and still later to Turdoides. The species ending was, however, retained in these new combinations but the corrected feminine form caudata matches the Latin gender of the genus Turdoides.

The common babbler group includes eclipes (Hume, 1877) from northern Pakistan to northwestern India and nominate caudata ( Dumont de Sainte Croix, 1823) in southern Pakistan, Nepal, Bangladesh and India (including the Lakshadweep Islands).

== Behaviour and ecology ==
Like most other babblers, the common babbler is found in small parties of six to twenty. They are vociferous, moving on the ground often with members keeping watch from the tops of bushes. They forage through the undergrowth hopping on the ground and creeping like rodents. When moving on the ground, they often keep the long tail raised. The calls include a rapid trill which-which-whichi-ri-ri-ri-ri while the alarm consists of a high pitched squeak. They are found mainly in dry regions with sparse and low thorny scrub vegetation. They feed on insects, berries and grains. Favourite berries include those of the Lantana and Capparis.

Several breeding pairs may be found within a group. Adults will often indulge in preening the head and neck feathers of other group members. The nesting season in India is in summer (May to July) with two peaks broken by a gap during the rains. They build a shallow cup nest low in a thorny bush and lay about 2-3 turquoise blue eggs. In northern India, they have been found to use heaps of lopped up Zizyphus for nesting. The eggs hatch after about 13–15 days. Broods may be parasitized by the Jacobin cuckoo and the common hawk-cuckoo. The young birds are able to fly after about a week and continue to stay with the group, joining the adults at the roost. Helpers, possibly young birds from the previous brood may assist the parents, feeding the brooding females and the young birds. The feeding bird often hops after delivering food calls with a low trill and shivers its feathers. The gape of young birds is yellow and the iris colour changes from hazel to dark brown. They roost communally. The cooperative breeding structure is thought to be formed by groups of males with a shared lineage with the females moving out of their natal groups.

== Gallery ==
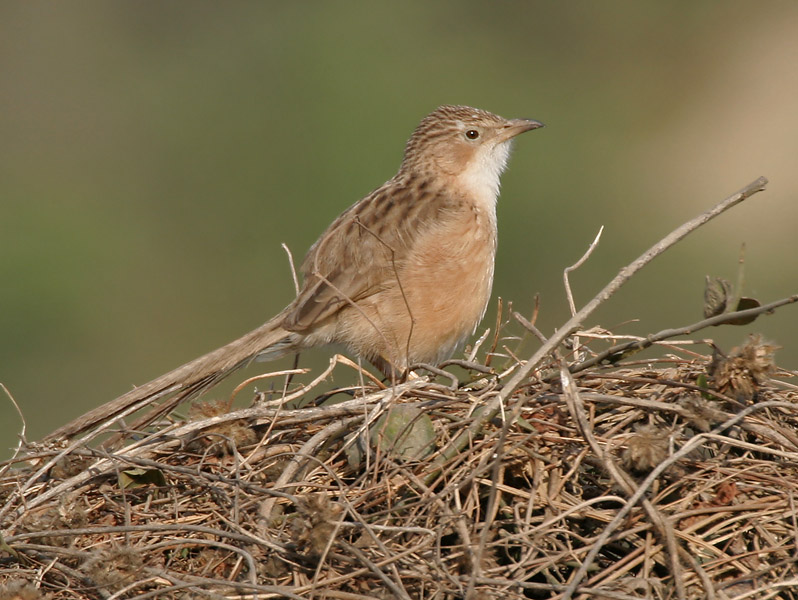
T. c. caudata (Haryana, India)

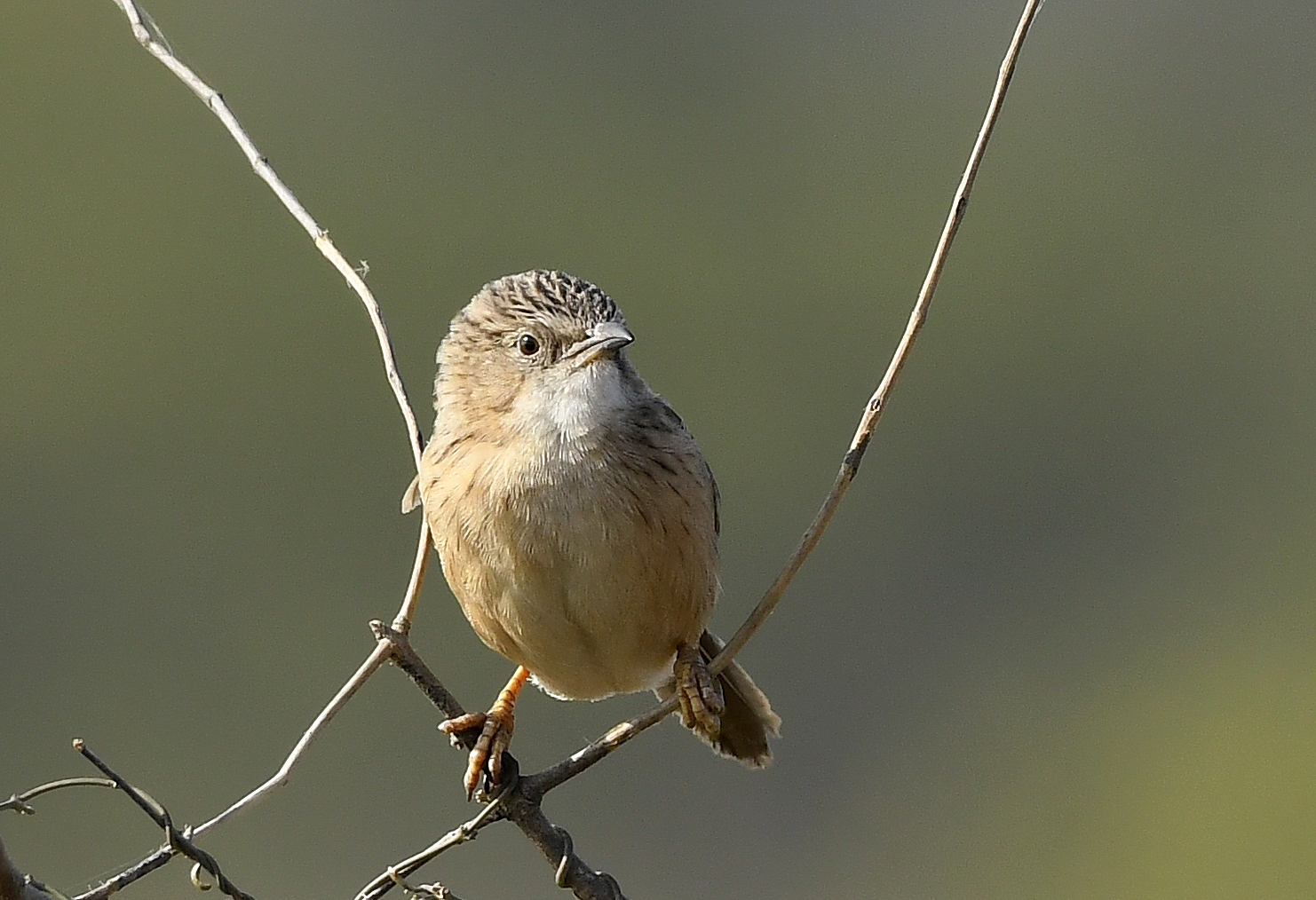
Common babbler T. c. caudata at Khijadiya Bird Sanctuary, Gujarat, India

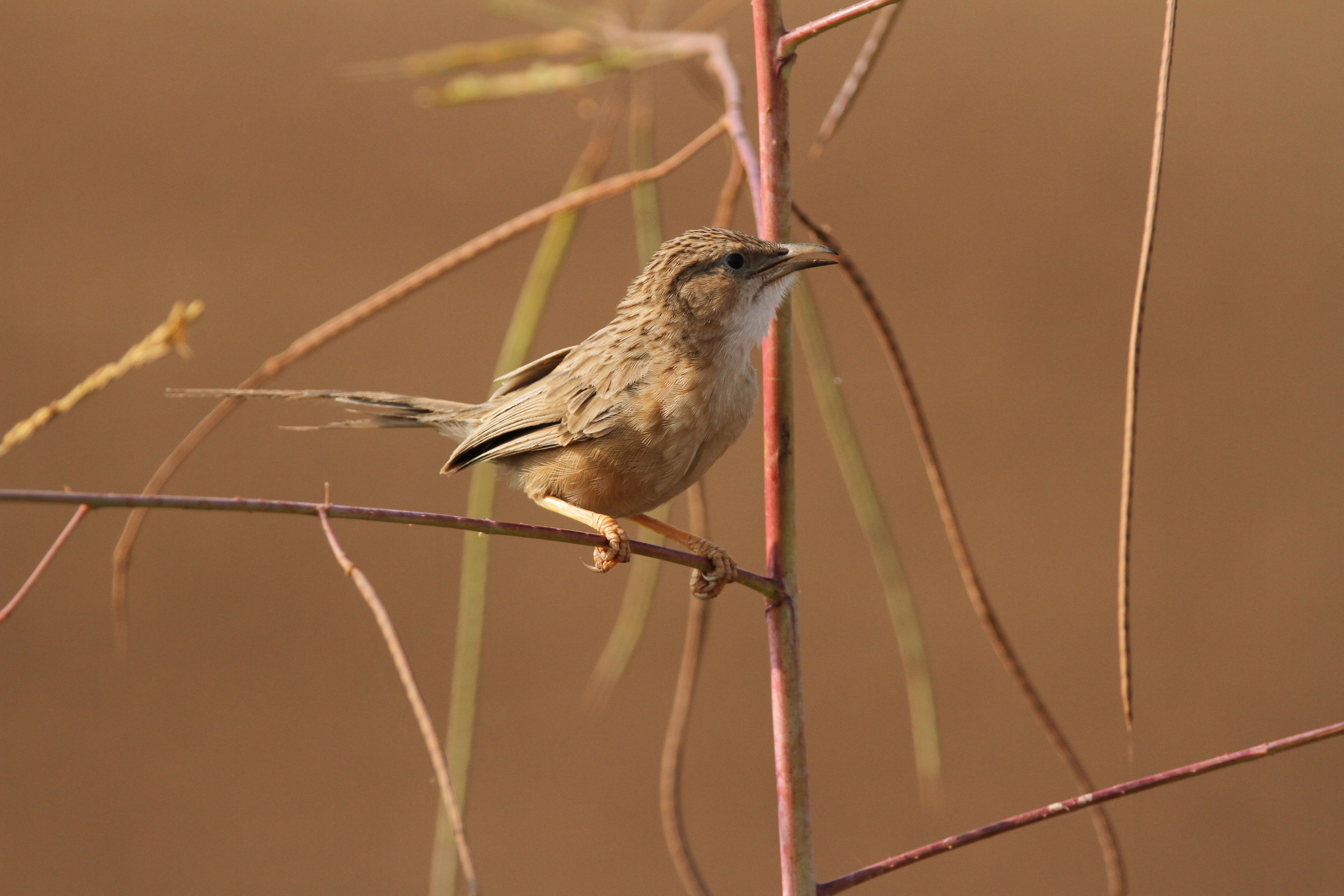
From India
