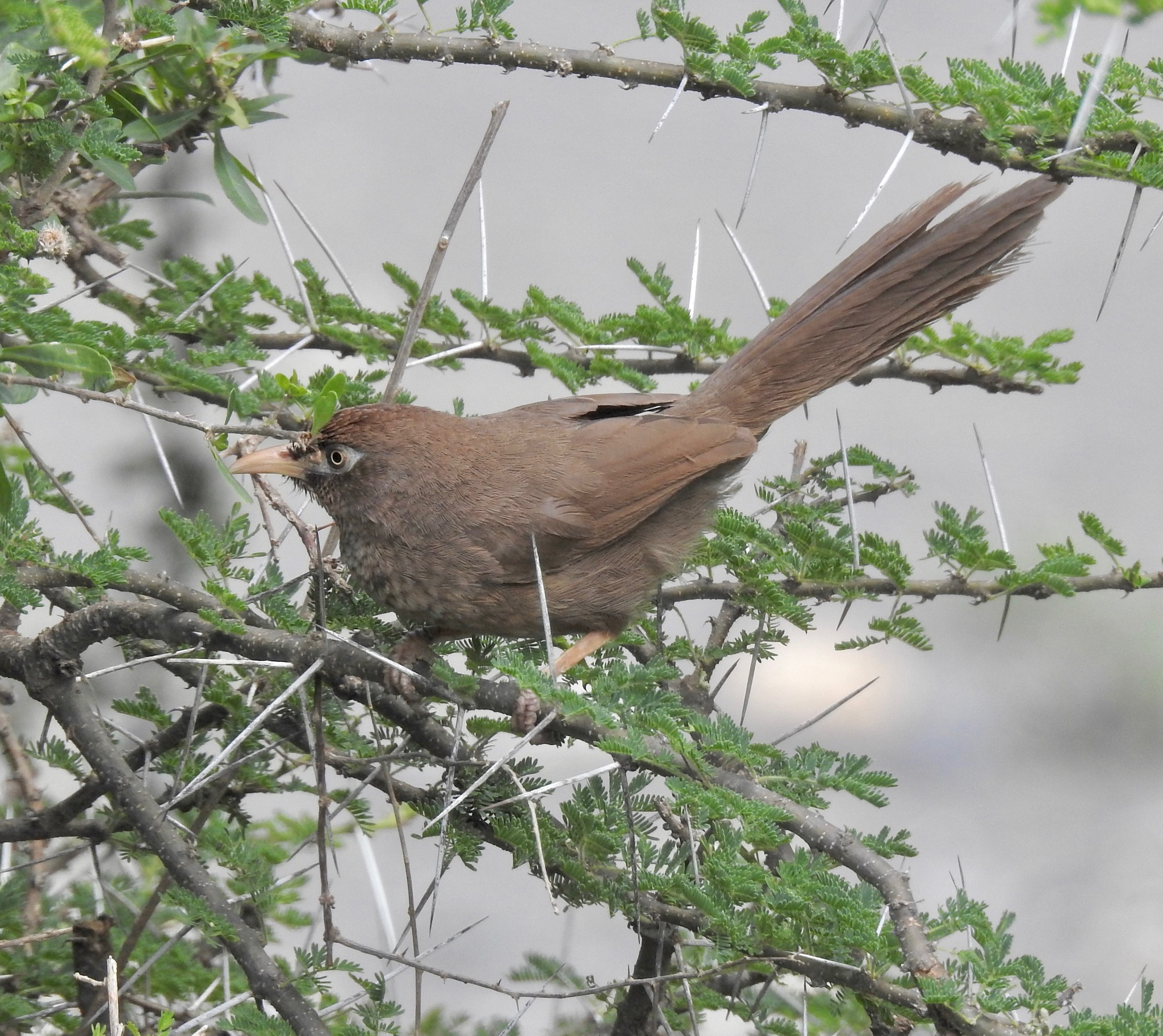
- in Longido, Tanzania

Conservation status
- Least Concern (IUCN 3.1)

Scientific classification
- Kingdom: Animalia
- Phylum: Chordata
- Class: Aves
- Order: Passeriformes
- Family: Leiothrichidae
- Genus: Argya
- Species: A. aylmeri

Binomial name
- Argya aylmeri Shelley, 1885

Synonyms
- Turdoides aylmeri

= Scaly chatterer =

Species of bird

The scaly chatterer (Argya aylmeri) is a species of bird in the family Leiothrichidae. It is also known as the bare-eyed babbler. It is found in Ethiopia, Kenya, Somalia, and Tanzania. Its natural habitat is subtropical or tropical dry shrubland.

This species was formerly placed in the genus Turdoides but following the publication of a comprehensive molecular phylogenetic study in 2018, it was moved to the resurrected genus Argya.
