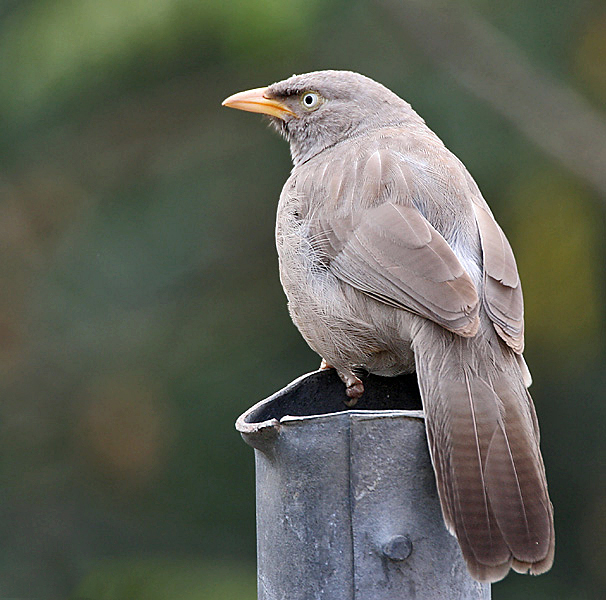
- Jungle babbler (Argya striata)

Scientific classification
- Kingdom: Animalia
- Phylum: Chordata
- Class: Aves
- Order: Passeriformes
- Family: Leiothrichidae
- Genus: Argya; Lesson, RP, 1831

Type species
- Malurus squamiceps Cretzschmar, 1827

Species
- See text

= Argya =

Genus of birds in the family Leiothrichidae

Argya is a genus of passerine birds in the laughingthrush family Leiothrichidae. The species are distributed across Africa and southern Asia and are typically fairly large, long-tailed birds that forage in noisy groups. Members of this genus were formerly placed in the genera Turdoides and Garrulax.

== Taxonomy ==
Most of the species now placed in the genus Argya were previously assigned to the genus Turdoides. Following the publication of a molecular phylogenetic study in 2018, Turdoides was split and species were moved to the resurrected genus Argya that had been erected by the French naturalist René Lesson in 1831. The name is from the Latin argutus meaning "noisy". Lesson did not specify a type species but this was designated as the Arabian babbler (Argya squamiceps) by the English zoologist George Robert Gray in 1855.

The following cladogram showing the phylogenetic relationships between the species is based on a study by Alice Cibois and collaborators that was published in 2018. The Iraq babbler (Argya altirostris) and the orange-billed babbler (Argya rufescens) were not included in the study. The Afghan babbler (Argya huttoni) has also subsequently been split from the common babbler.

- Argya
  - - Large grey babbler – Argya malcolmi
    - Ashy-headed laughingthrush – Argya cinereifrons
  - - - - Slender-billed babbler – Argya longirostris
        - Rufous babbler – Argya subrufa
      - - Jungle babbler – Argya striata
        - Yellow-billed babbler – Argya affinis
    - - - Rufous chatterer – Argya rubiginosa
        - Scaly chatterer – Argya aylmeri
      - - Common babbler – Argya caudata
        - - - Fulvous babbler – Argya fulva
            - Arabian babbler – Argya squamiceps
          - - Striated babbler – Argya earlei
            - White-throated babbler – Argya gularis

=== Species ===
The genus contains 16 species:

Image	Common name	Scientific name	Distribution
	Large grey babbler	Argya malcolmi	India
	Ashy-headed laughingthrush	Argya cinereifrons	Sri Lanka
	Arabian babbler	Argya squamiceps	United Arab Emirates, Oman, Yemen and western Saudi Arabia
	Fulvous babbler	Argya fulva	Algeria, Chad, Egypt, Eritrea, Ethiopia, Libya, Mali, Mauritania, Morocco, Niger, Nigeria, Senegal, Sudan, and Tunisia.
	White-throated babbler	Argya gularis	Myanmar.
	Striated babbler	Argya earlei	Pakistan to Myanmar.
	Iraq babbler	Argya altirostris	Iraq and south-western Iran
	Common babbler	Argya caudata	India.
	Afghan babbler	Argya huttoni	southeastern Iraq to south western Pakistan.
	Rufous chatterer	Argya rubiginosa	Ethiopia, Kenya, Somalia, Sudan, Tanzania, and Uganda.
	Scaly chatterer	Argya aylmeri	Ethiopia, Kenya, Somalia, and Tanzania.
	Yellow-billed babbler	Argya affinis	southern India and Sri Lanka.
	Jungle babbler	Argya striata	India
	Orange-billed babbler	Argya rufescens	Sri Lanka.
	Slender-billed babbler	Argya longirostris	Bangladesh, Nepal, Northeast India and possibly Myanmar
	Rufous babbler	Argya subrufa	India
