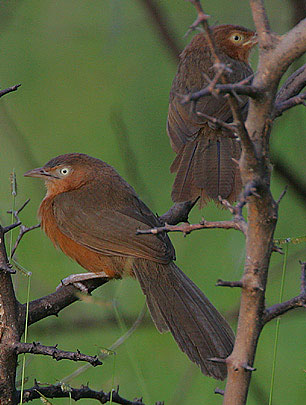
- At Watamu, Kenya

Conservation status
- Least Concern (IUCN 3.1)

Scientific classification
- Kingdom: Animalia
- Phylum: Chordata
- Class: Aves
- Order: Passeriformes
- Family: Leiothrichidae
- Genus: Argya
- Species: A. rubiginosa

Binomial name
- Argya rubiginosa (Rüppell, 1845)

Synonyms
- Turdoides rubiginosa

= Rufous chatterer =

Species of bird

The rufous chatterer (Argya rubiginosa) is a species of bird in the family Leiothrichidae. It is found in Ethiopia, Kenya, Somalia, Sudan, Tanzania, and Uganda. Its natural habitats are dry savanna and subtropical or tropical dry shrubland.

This species was formerly placed in the genus Turdoides but following the publication of a comprehensive molecular phylogenetic study in 2018, it was moved to the resurrected genus Argya.
