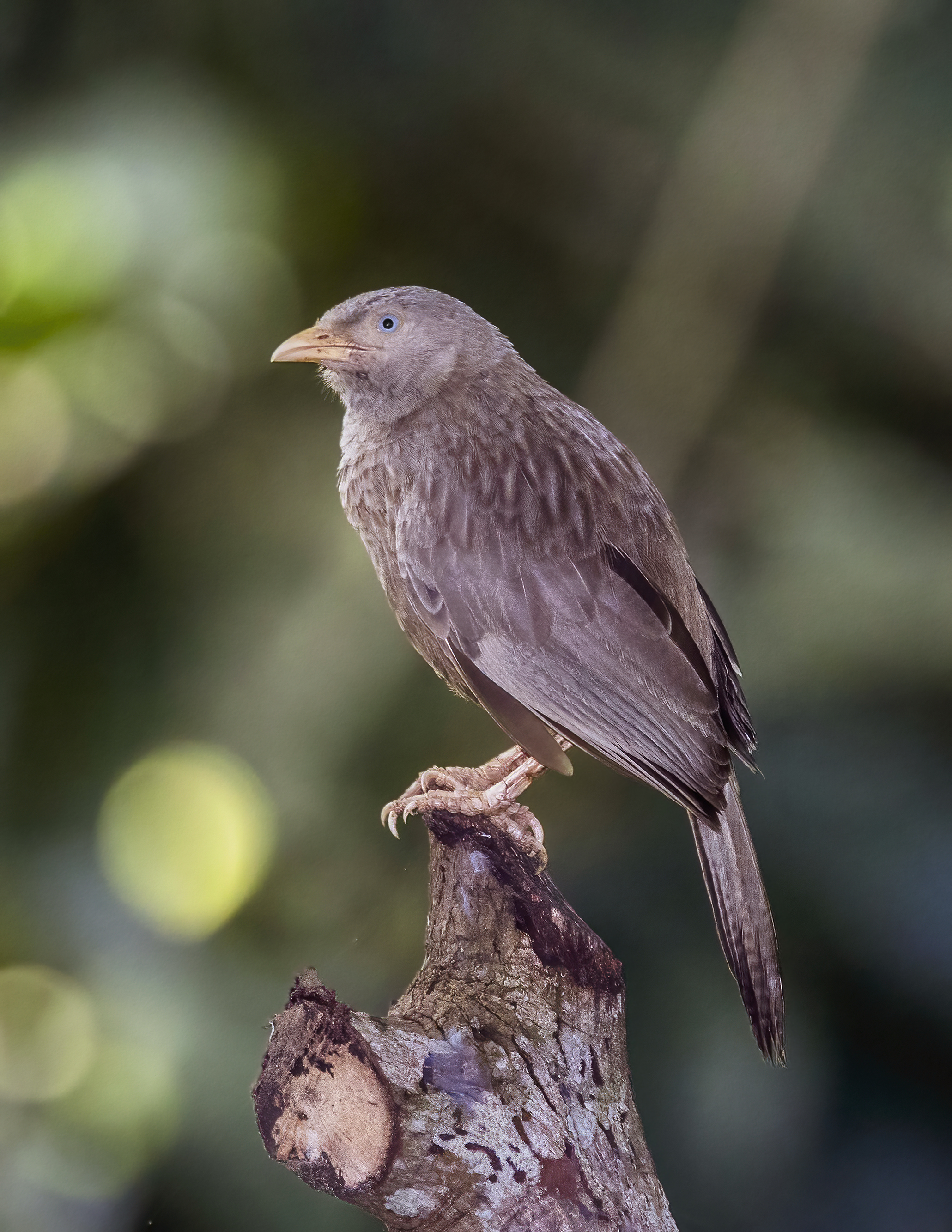
- A. a. taprobanus, Sri Lanka Contact calls

Conservation status
- Least Concern (IUCN 3.1)

Scientific classification
- Kingdom: Animalia
- Phylum: Chordata
- Class: Aves
- Order: Passeriformes
- Family: Leiothrichidae
- Genus: Argya
- Species: A. affinis

Binomial name
- Argya affinis (Jerdon, 1845)

Synonyms
- Turdoides affinis

= Yellow-billed babbler =

Species of brown-grey bird from southern India and Sri Lanka

The yellow-billed babbler (Argya affinis) is a member of the family Leiothrichidae endemic to southern India and Sri Lanka. The yellow-billed babbler is a common resident breeding bird in Sri Lanka and southern India. Its habitat is scrub, cultivation and garden land. This species, like most babblers, is not migratory, and has short rounded wings and a weak flight and is usually seen calling and foraging in groups. It is often mistaken for the jungle babbler, whose range overlaps in parts of southern India, although it has a distinctive call and tends to be found in more vegetated habitats. Its name is also confused with Turdoides leucocephala, which is also known as white-headed babbler.

== Taxonomy ==
The yellow-billed babbler was formerly placed in the genus Turdoides but following the publication of a comprehensive molecular phylogenetic study in 2018, it was moved to the resurrected genus Argya.

== Description ==
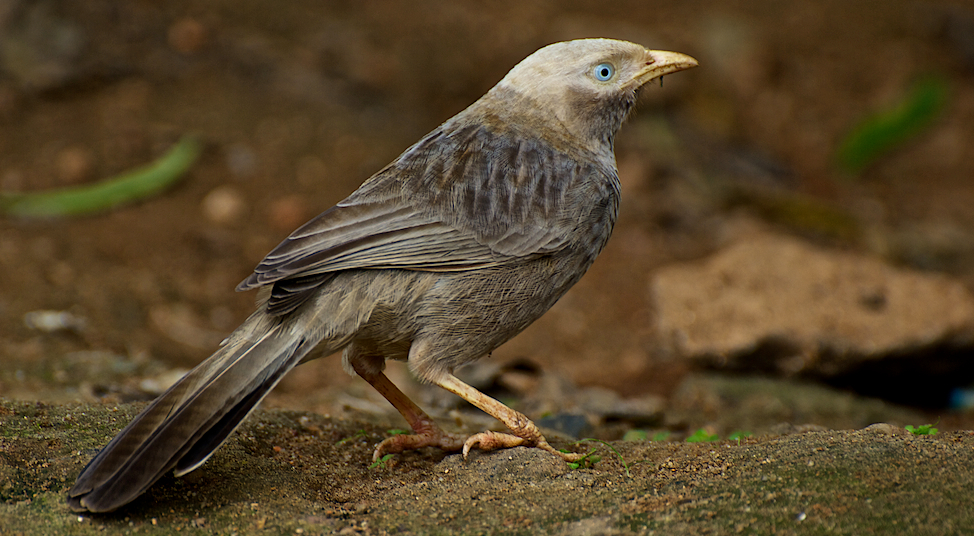
Adult of nominate form showing pale cap

These birds have grey brown upperparts, a grey throat and breast with some mottling, and a pale buff belly. The head and nape are grey, and the eyes are bluish white. The nominate race, found in southern India, has a whitish crown and nape, with a darker mantle. The rump is pale and the tail has a broad dark tip. The Sri Lankan subspecies A. a. taprobanus is drab pale grey. Birds in the extreme south of India are very similar to the Sri Lankan subspecies with the colour of the crown and back being more grey than the nominate race. The Indian form is more heavily streaked on the throat and breast. The Sri Lankan subspecies resembles the jungle babbler, Turdoides striatus, although that species does not occur on the island.

Seven distinctive vocalisations have been noted in this species and this species has a higher pitched call than the jungle babbler. The jungle babbler has calls that have a harsher and nasal quality.

The taxonomy of this species was confused in the past and confounded with the sympatric jungle babbler and the orange-billed babbler of Sri Lanka.

== Distribution and habitat ==
This species is patchily distributed in southern India and Sri Lanka. The nominate subspecies is found in Andhra Pradesh, south of the Godavari river and Karnataka south of Belgaum into Tamil Nadu. It prefers lower altitudes and drier habitats than the jungle babbler but sometimes is found alongside it. The Sri Lankan subspecies is found in the lowlands and hills up to about 1,500 m (4,900 ft) avoiding heavy forest. It is a common garden bird and frequently visits urban and suburban areas.

== Behaviour and ecology ==
The yellow-billed babbler lives in flocks of seven to ten or more. It is a very noisy bird, and the presence of a flock may generally be known at some distance by the continual chattering, squeaking and chirping produced by its members. Sometimes, all the members start chattering loud enough to irritate the human ear significantly. One member often perches high and acts as a sentinel while the remaining members of the flock forage on or close to the ground. They feed mainly on insects, but also eat fruit, nectar and human food scraps. They have been known to take Calotes versicolor lizards and whip-scorpions. They do not fly long distances; the maximum distance flown non-stop was about 180 m (590 ft) and prior to flying, they usually gain height by moving up a tree or tall shrub. Black drongos, rufous treepies and Indian palm squirrels are often seen foraging near these babblers.

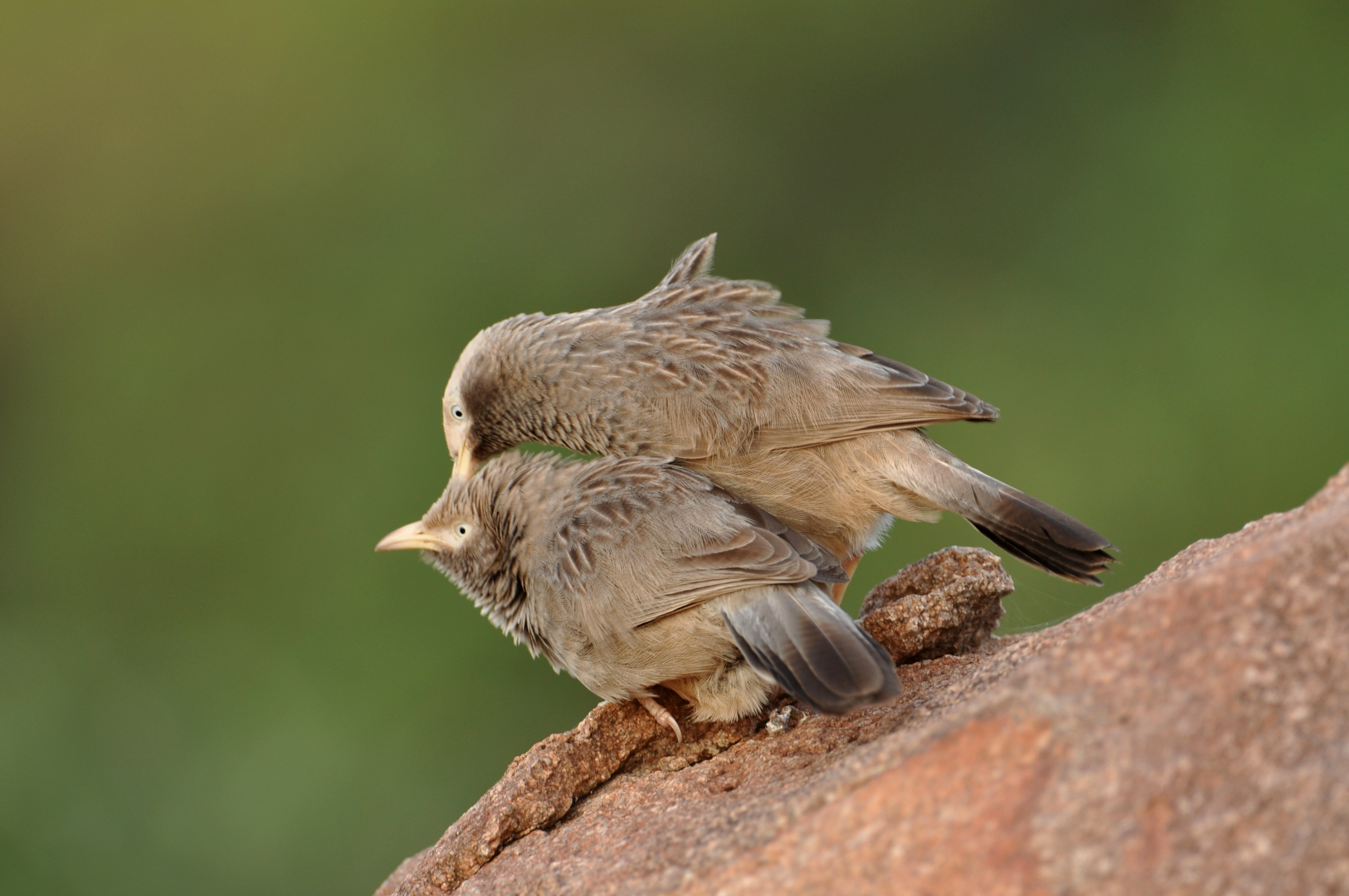
Yellow-billed babblers allopreening

The babblers wake before dawn around 6:00 AM and begin foraging. They are relatively inactive in the hot hours of the day from 1:30 PM to 4:30 PM. They assemble in groups around 7:00 PM and preen themselves before going to roost. Members of a group roost next to each other with some juveniles wedging themselves in the middle of the group. When foraging the sentinel bird calls with wing fluttering and hopping. Allopreening is a common activity, particularly in winter, and members may beg for food from other members. Yellow-billed babblers particularly like to bathe, and may visit birdbaths in their general territories, usually around late afternoon to evening. Sometimes these birds have been observed visiting bird baths at around 6:30 PM, after sunset.

A study in the Sivakasi plains noted that groups had a home range of 0.4 km^{2} and the population density was about 55 birds per km^{2}.

=== Breeding ===
Nests of the species are seen throughout the year but the peak breeding season is prior to the onset of the Indian southwest monsoon. Nests are built in trees, concealed in dense masses of foliage. The majority of nests are built below a height of four metres from the ground. The nest is a small cup placed in a fork of a branch. The normal clutch is two to four turquoise blue eggs, although up to five may be laid by birds in the hills of Sri Lanka. The eggs hatch after 14 to 16 days. The brooding parent bird often stands on the rim of the nest rather than sit on the chicks. Brood parasitism of the babblers' nests by the pied cuckoo (Clamator jacobinus) is known from both India and Sri Lanka. The common hawk-cuckoo has also been noted as a brood parasite. In an exceptional case, jungle babblers have been seen feeding the chicks of the yellow-billed babbler. Chicks are mainly fed insects and the occasional lizard. Like most perching birds, the parents take care of nest sanitation, removing the faecal sacs of the young, typically by swallowing them. Helpers have been seen to assist the parents in building the nest as well as in feeding the chicks at the nest.

=== Mortality ===
Predators of the eggs include mongoose, crows and the greater coucal which may also prey on chicks. Rat snakes (Ptyas mucosus) may sometimes take chicks.

== In culture ==
In Sri Lanka, this bird is known as demalichcha in Sinhala language. In Tamil Nadu, this bird is known as Thavittu-kuruvi, Pandri-kuruvi, Velaikkara-kuruvi, Konnaivai-kuruvi, Kalani-kuruvi, Pooniyal kuruvi, Oor kuruvi in Tamil language.

== Other sources ==
- Jeyasingh, DEP (1975) Some observations on chick rearing in the White headed Babbler (Turdoides affinis). Newsletter for Birdwatchers . 15(1), 5–7.
- Zacharias VJ (1978). Ecology and Biology of certain species of Babblers. Turdoides species (Ph.D. thesis). Calicut University.
