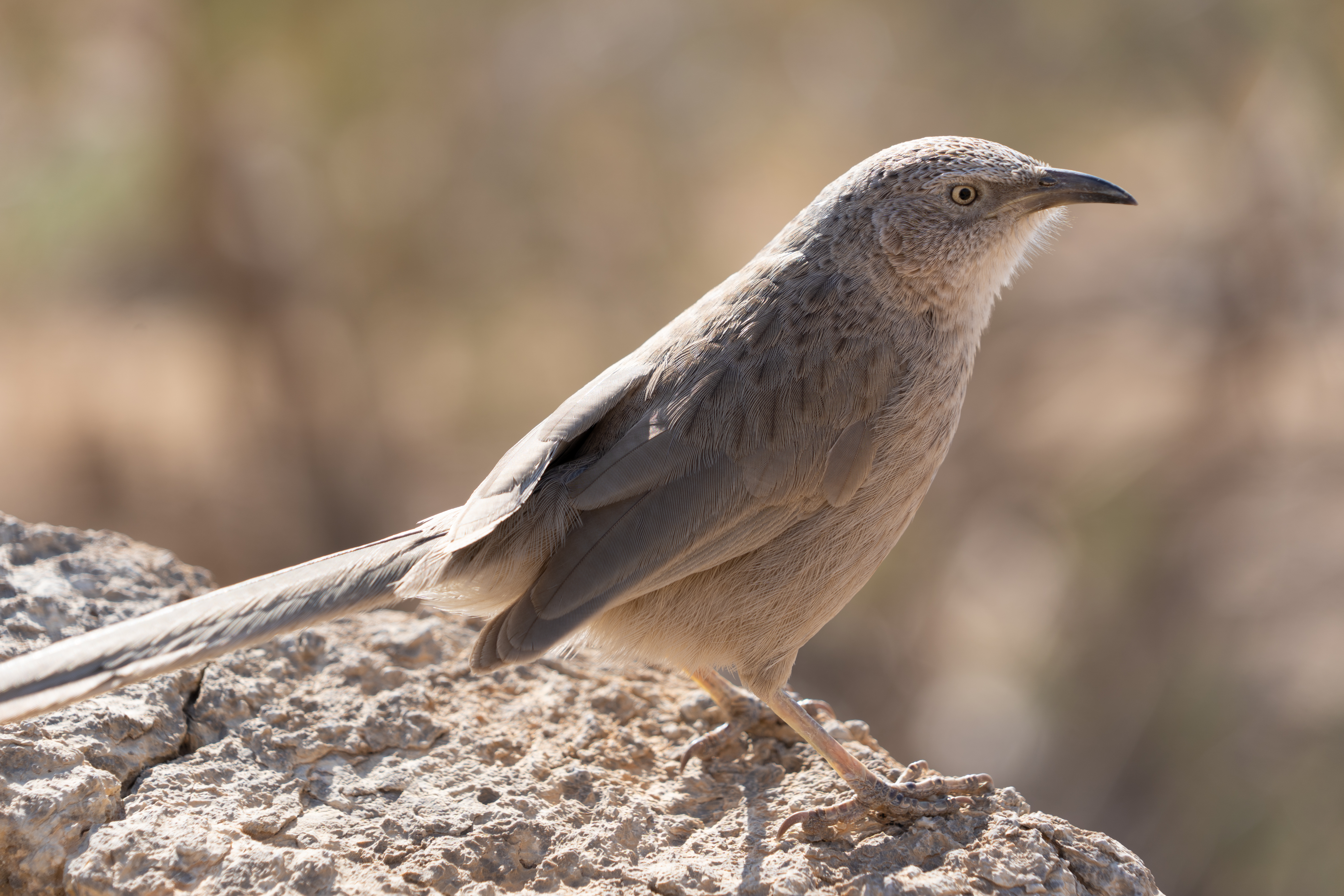

Conservation status
- Least Concern (IUCN 3.1)

Scientific classification
- Kingdom: Animalia
- Phylum: Chordata
- Class: Aves
- Order: Passeriformes
- Family: Leiothrichidae
- Genus: Argya
- Species: A. squamiceps

Binomial name
- Argya squamiceps (Cretzschmar, 1827)

Synonyms
- Turdoides squamiceps

= Arabian babbler =

Species of bird

The Arabian babbler (Argya squamiceps) is a passerine bird until recently placed in the genus Turdoides. It is a communally nesting resident bird of arid scrub in the Middle East which lives together in relatively stable groups with strict orders of rank.

== Taxonomy ==
The Arabian babbler was formerly placed in the genus Turdoides but following the publication of a comprehensive molecular phylogenetic study in 2018, it was moved to the resurrected genus Argya.

The Leiothrichidae primarily occur in the Ethiopian and Oriental realms, but a few species in the genera Turdoides and Argya have penetrated into the Palearctic zone north of the tropics where they live in arid areas of North and East Africa, India and the Middle East.

== Description ==
It is 26 to 29 cm (10 to 11 in) long with a wingspan of 31 to 33.5 cm (12.2 to 13.2 in) and a weight of 64 to 87.9 g (2.26 to 3.10 oz). It has a fairly long curved bill, a long tail, rounded wings and strong legs and feet. The plumage is grey-brown above, paler below. There are dark streaks on the back and the throat is whitish. It has a variety of calls including whistles, trills and chattering.

== Distribution and habitat ==
The Arabian babbler prefers to settle along dry river beds with few trees and bushes. It is found in eastern, southern and western Arabia, occurring in the United Arab Emirates, Oman, Yemen and western Saudi Arabia but absent from the central and north-eastern parts of the peninsula. Its range extends north to Jordan, Israel and eastern Sinai. It inhabits arid scrubland and savanna, occurring up to 2800 metres above sea-level in Yemen.

== Behaviour ==
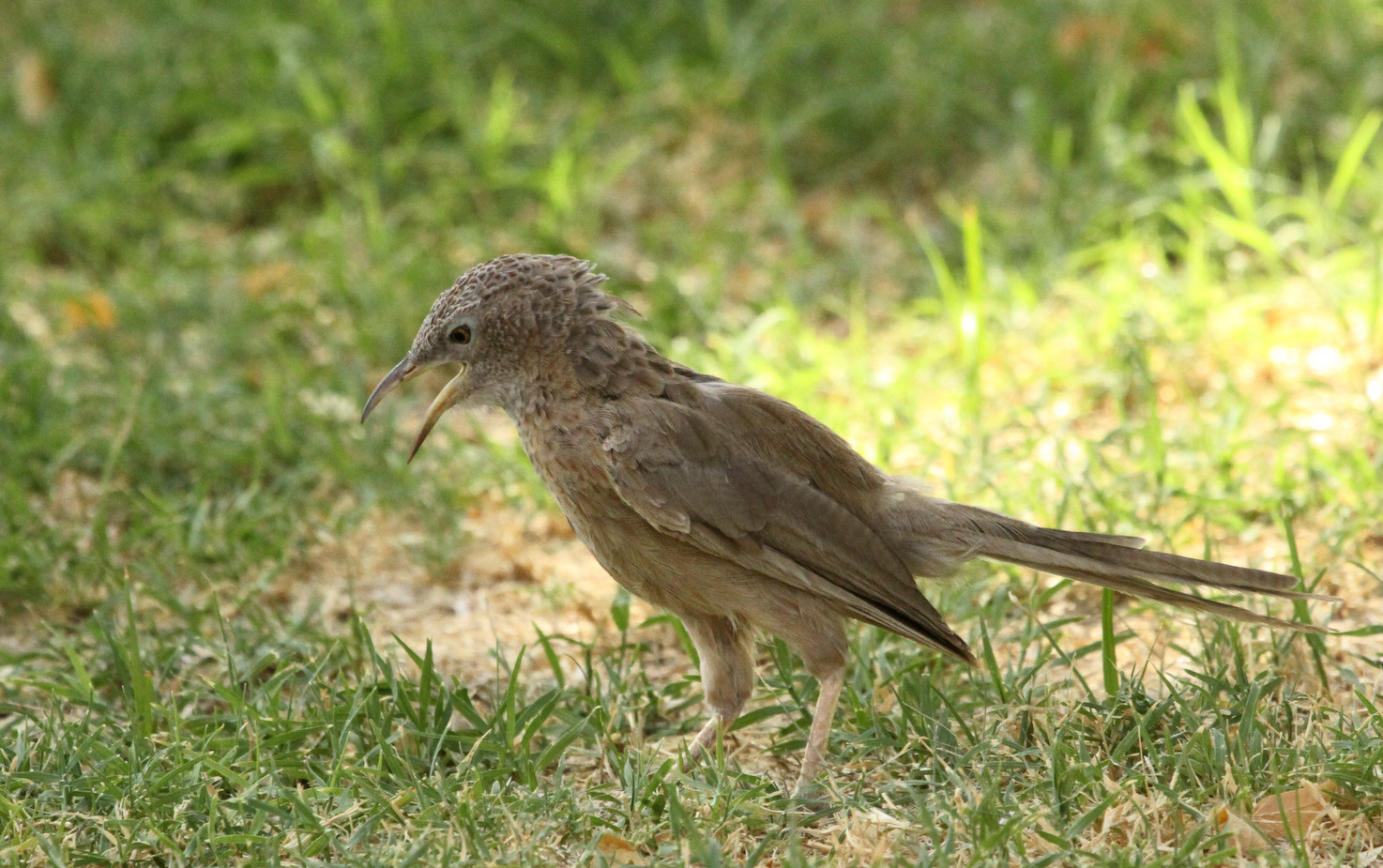
Al Ain, Abu Dhabi, UAE

Babblers dance and take baths together, offer each other gifts, clean themselves, and sometimes enter into conflict with each other for the privilege of helping another babbler. They may also feed their counterparts. This peculiar behaviour made them a privileged example for ethological theories concerning altruism among animals.

Starting in the 1970s, Amotz Zahavi observed the babbler at length, giving rise to his theory of signal and its correlative, the handicap principle. Although babblers were considered particularly altruistic animals, Zahavi reinterpreted their behaviour according to his theory. Thus, Zahavi (1974) theorised that chick feeding by Arabian babbler helpers acts as a signal by the helper to gain social prestige within the group.

Yitzchak Ben-Mocha of the Max Planck Institute for Ornithology has studied Arabian babblers in Israel's Shezaf Nature Reserve. He has found evidence of intentional communication in the process used by adult babblers to encourage fledglings to move to a new shelter through calls and movement. Ben-Mocha and colleagues later found that dominant pairs conceal their copulations and mating solicitations from other adult group members. This makes the Arabian babbler the only known non-human species in which dominant individuals habitually conceal mating. Ben-Mocha later argued that such concealed mating maintains cooperation with helpers who cannot mate. He called this the cooperation maintenance hypothesis.

=== Group structure and breeding biology ===
Arabian babblers are cooperative breeders that live in groups and defend territories year round. Group size varies from two to 10 individuals. Their territories vary with the group size as well as the presence of neighboring groups. Groups consist of a reproductive pair and other non-breeding members who may or may not be direct offspring or close relatives. Helpers usually do not reproduce, but they participate in rearing the offspring, that is, in providing food, as well as other parental behaviour like incubation, territory defence and defence against predators.

Groups are labelled according to the relatedness of helpers to the reproductive pair:

1. Simple group: where all helpers are direct offspring of the breeding pairs.
2. Polyandrous group: where helpers include potential male breeders.
3. Polygynous group: where helpers include potential female breeders.
4. Complex group: which has non-related helpers of both sexes.

=== Nest ===
Babblers build open cup-shaped nests in the dense part of the tree or bush. Their breeding period starts generally from February and varies up to July and is highly dependent on the seasonal rainfall of the region which in turn regulates the food availability. They copulate throughout the year. Eggs are laid usually from February to July. Most clutches contain four eggs, laid on consecutive days. Incubation usually starts after laying the last egg and continues for 14 days until the chicks hatch. The nestlings fledge about 14 days after hatching.

=== Diet ===
The diet of the babblers includes a variety of invertebrates (mostly arthropods), small vertebrates (lizards, geckos, snakes) and plant material, like nectar, flowers, berries, leaves and seeds.

== Bibliography ==
- Hollom, P. A. D.; Porter, R. F.; Christensen, S. & Willis, Ian (1988) Birds of the Middle East and North Africa, T & AD Poyser, Calton, England.
- Snow, D. W. & Perrins, C. M. (1998) Birds of the Western Palearctic: Concise Edition, Vol. 2, Oxford University Press, Oxford.
