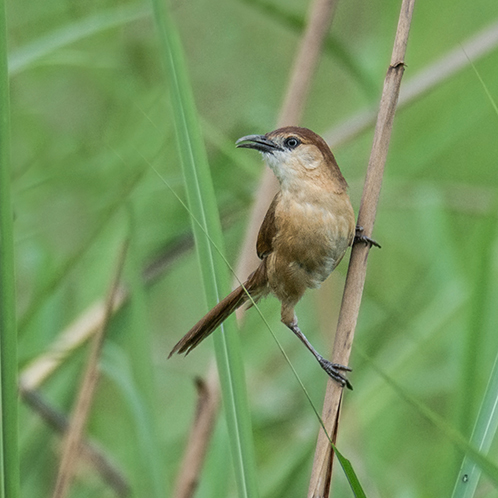

Conservation status
- Vulnerable (IUCN 3.1)

Scientific classification
- Kingdom: Animalia
- Phylum: Chordata
- Class: Aves
- Order: Passeriformes
- Family: Leiothrichidae
- Genus: Argya
- Species: A. longirostris

Binomial name
- Argya longirostris (Moore, F, 1854)

Synonyms
- Turdoides longirostris

= Slender-billed babbler =

Species of bird

The slender-billed babbler (Argya longirostris) is a species of bird in the family Leiothrichidae. It is found in Bangladesh, Nepal, Northeast India and possibly Myanmar. Its natural habitat is subtropical or tropical seasonally wet or flooded lowland grassland. It is threatened by habitat loss.

This species was formerly placed in the genus Turdoides but following the publication of a comprehensive molecular phylogenetic study in 2018, it was moved to the resurrected genus Argya.

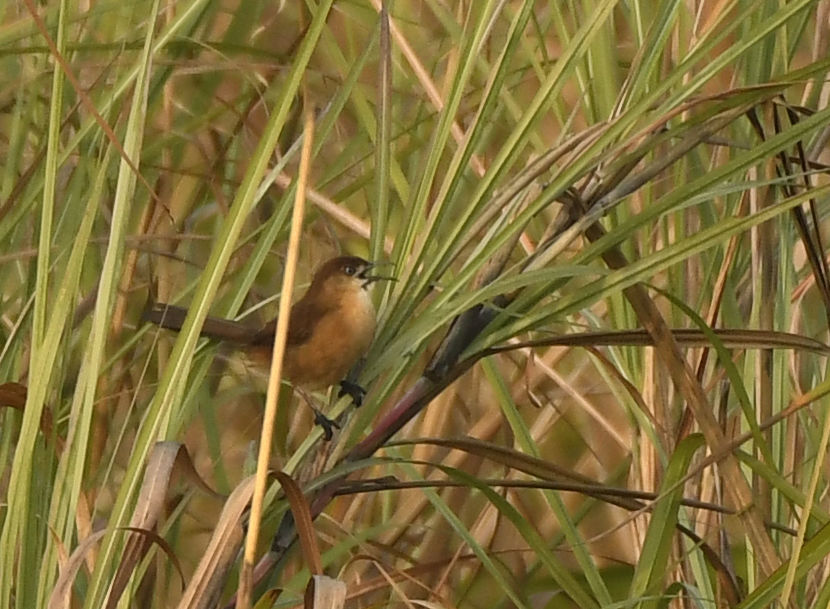
Slender-billed Babbler at Manas National Park, Assam, India
