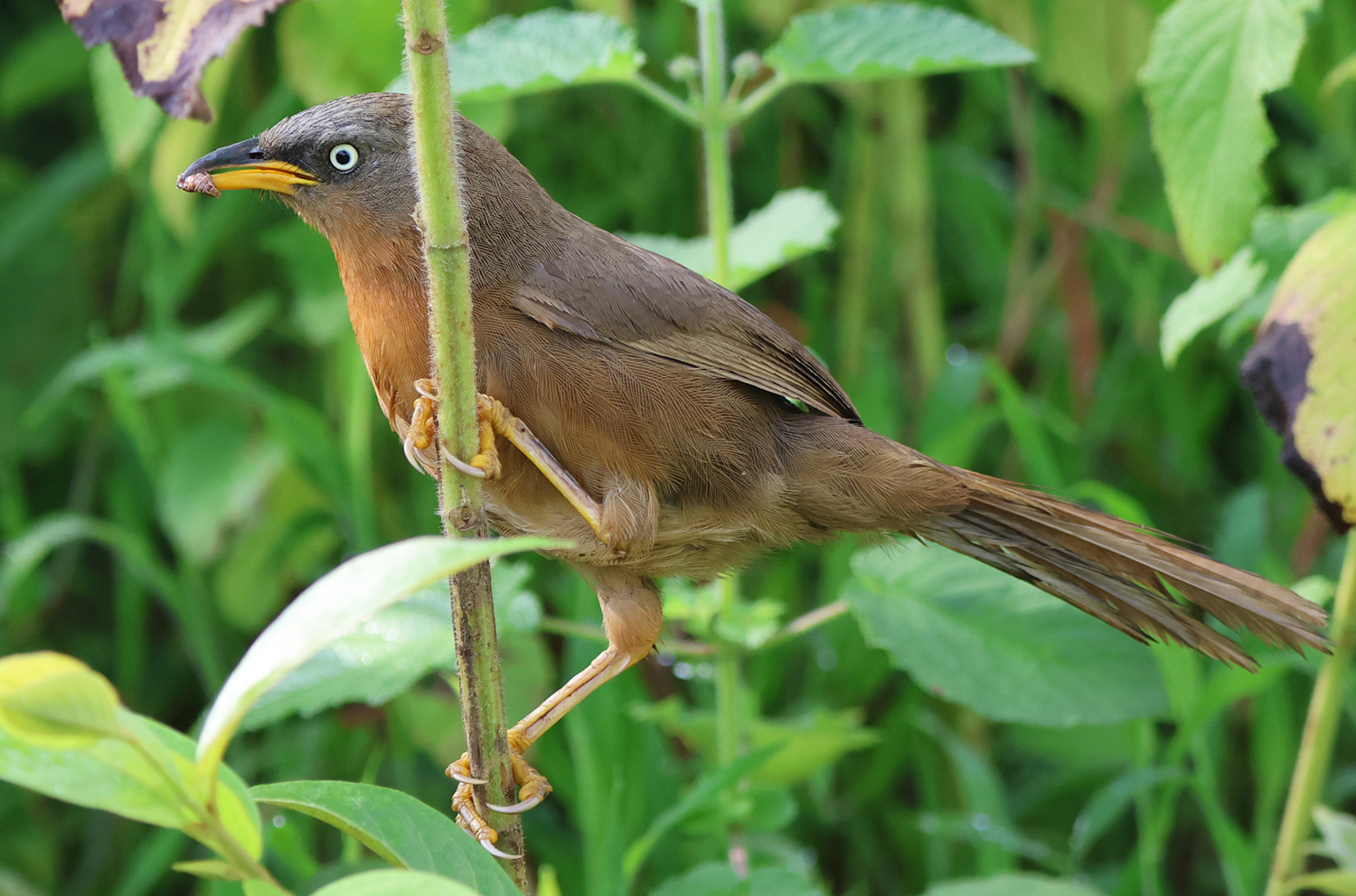

Conservation status
- Least Concern (IUCN 3.1)

Scientific classification
- Kingdom: Animalia
- Phylum: Chordata
- Class: Aves
- Order: Passeriformes
- Family: Leiothrichidae
- Genus: Argya
- Species: A. subrufa

Binomial name
- Argya subrufa (Jerdon, 1839)

Synonyms
- Turdoides subrufus Layardia subrufa Timalia subrufa Turdoides subrufa Timalia poecilorhyncha

Audio
- Calls near roost site (Coorg, India)

= Rufous babbler =

Species of bird

The rufous babbler (Argya subrufa) is an endemic species of bird found in the Western Ghats of southern India of the family Leiothrichidae It is dark brown and long tailed, and is usually seen foraging in noisy groups along open hillsides with a mixture of grass, bracken and forest.

== Taxonomy ==
The rufous babbler was formerly placed in the genus Turdoides but following the publication of a comprehensive molecular phylogenetic study in 2018, it was moved to the resurrected genus Argya.

== Description ==
This babbler is large and dark olive brown above with a grey forehead. The wing feathers have a rufous tinge. The feathers of the forehead have black shafts. The iris is pale white to yellow and the lores are dark. The underside is bright rufous, and paler on the center of the throat and belly. The nominate form (type location: Mananthawadi) is found in the Western Ghats north of the Palghat Gap while hyperythra found to the south is said to be more richly coloured. They are 25–26 cm long with a wing of 8.7-9.0 cm. The tail is about 11–11.5 cm long.

== Distribution and habitat ==
This species is found in the Western Ghats south of Mahabaleshwar south to the Palni hills and east into the Shevaroy hills. They are found mainly close to the ground where they feed on insects and berries but will also make use of trees. The usual habitat is open forest, scrub or grassy hillsides.

== Behaviour and ecology ==
The breeding season is mainly from February to November and the nest is a small cup in the fork of a tree. The eggs, ranging from two to four but usually three are dark glossy blue.

They have a loud ringing treenh-treenh call.

== Gallery ==
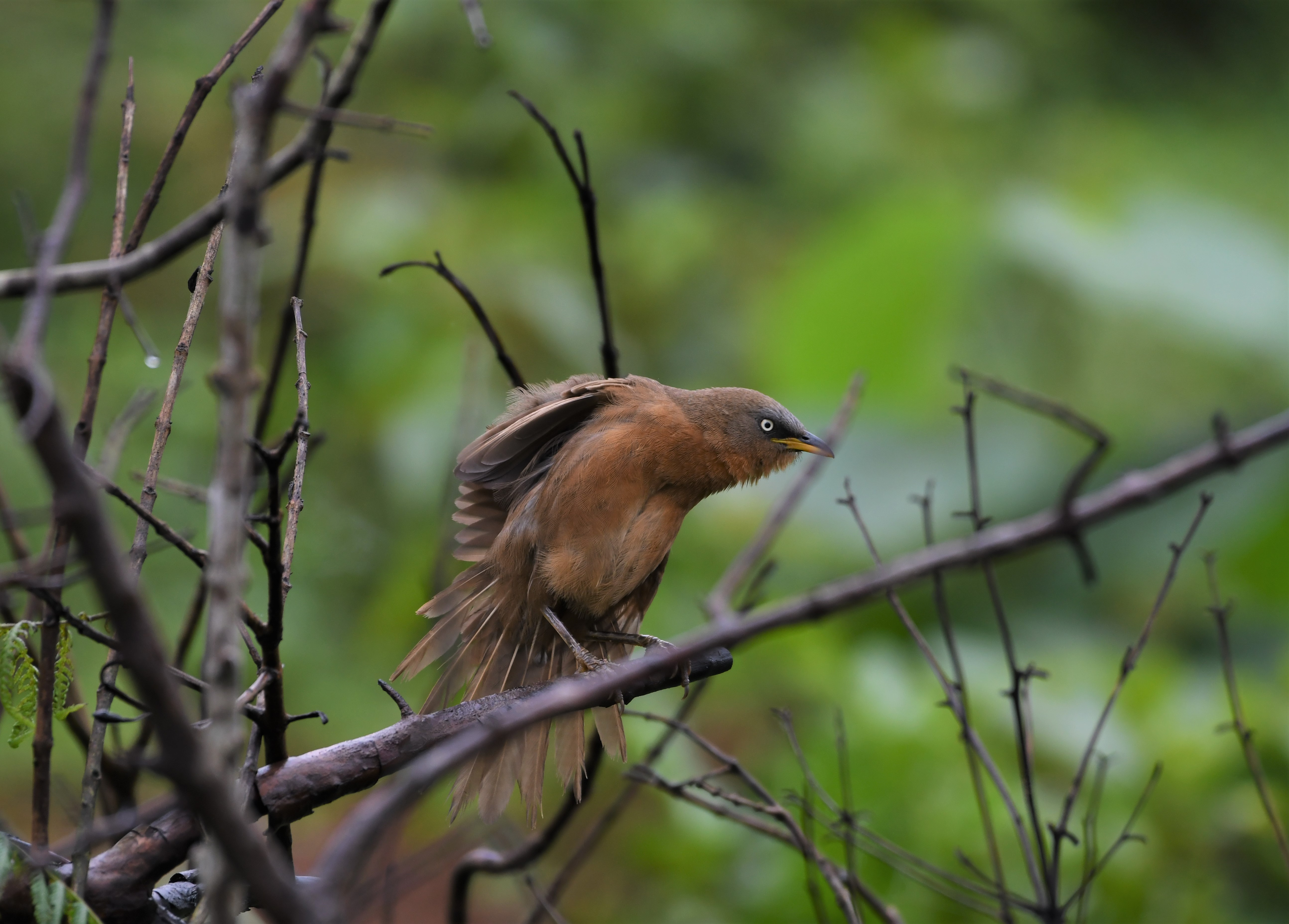
A rufous babbler at Nelliyampathy

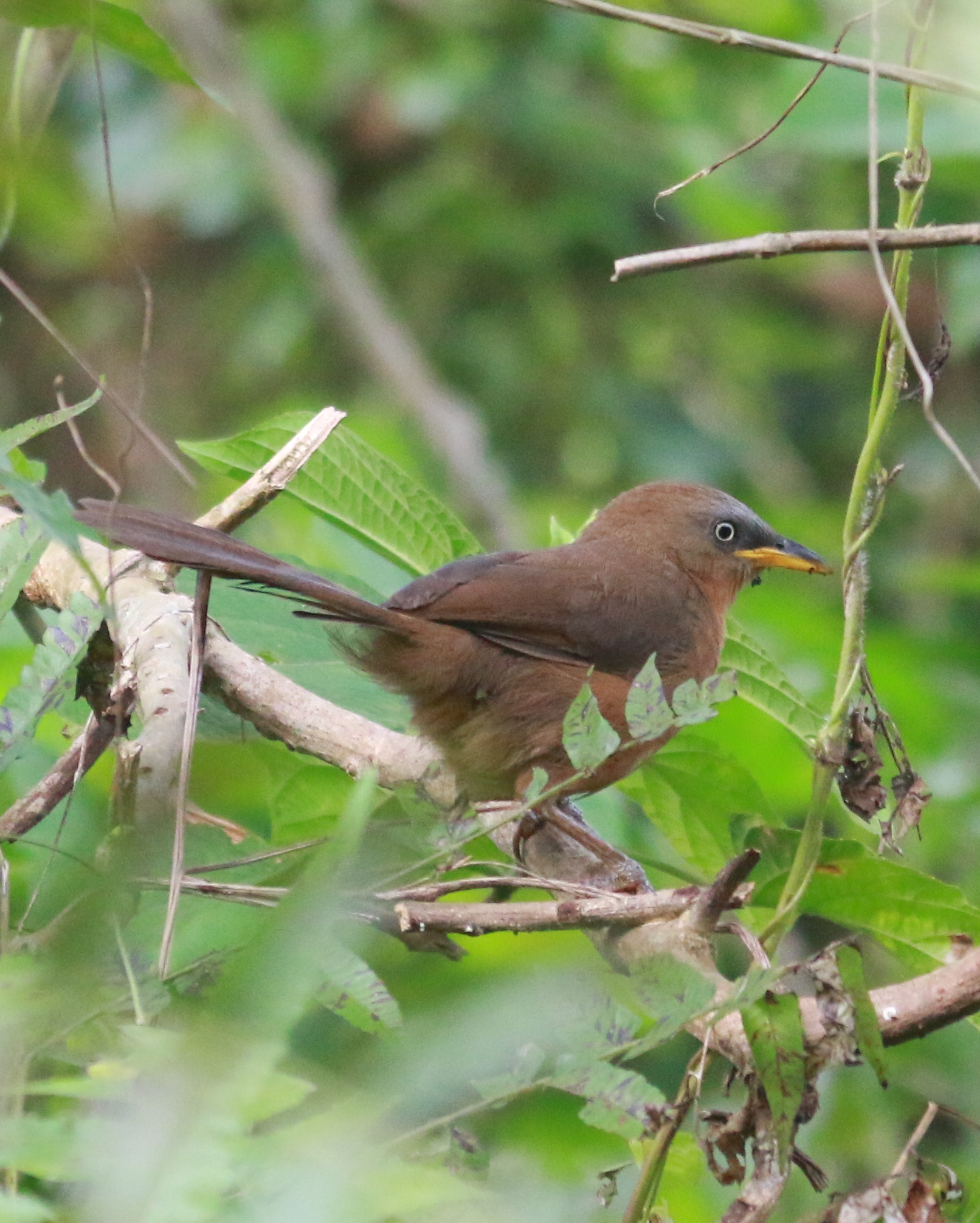
Rufous babbler in Kerala, India
