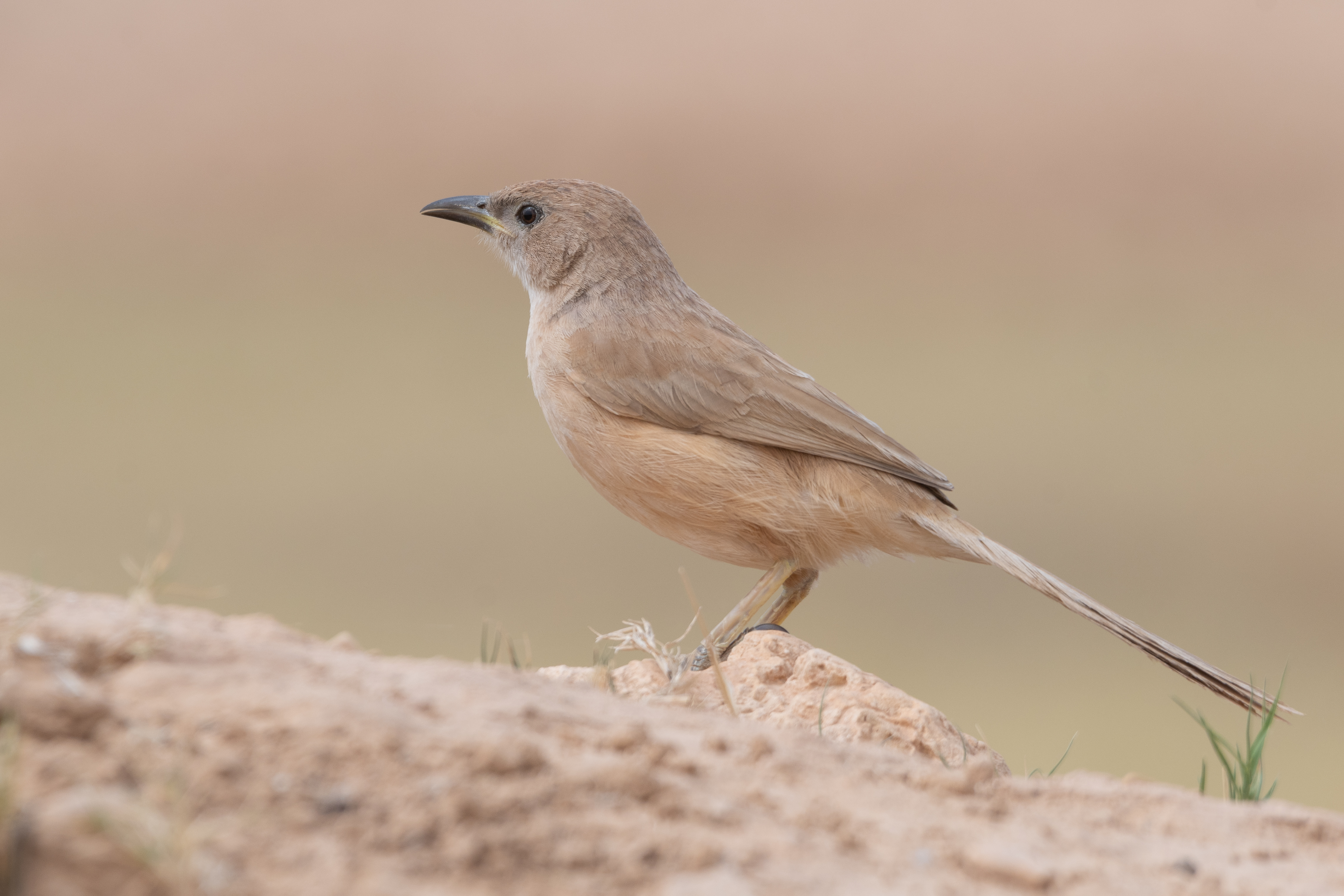
- Argya fulva fulva in Bouhedma National Park, Tunisia

Conservation status
- Least Concern (IUCN 3.1)

Scientific classification
- Kingdom: Animalia
- Phylum: Chordata
- Class: Aves
- Order: Passeriformes
- Family: Leiothrichidae
- Genus: Argya
- Species: A. fulva

Binomial name
- Argya fulva (Desfontaines, 1789)

Synonyms
- Turdoides fulvus Turdoides fulva

= Fulvous babbler =

Species of bird

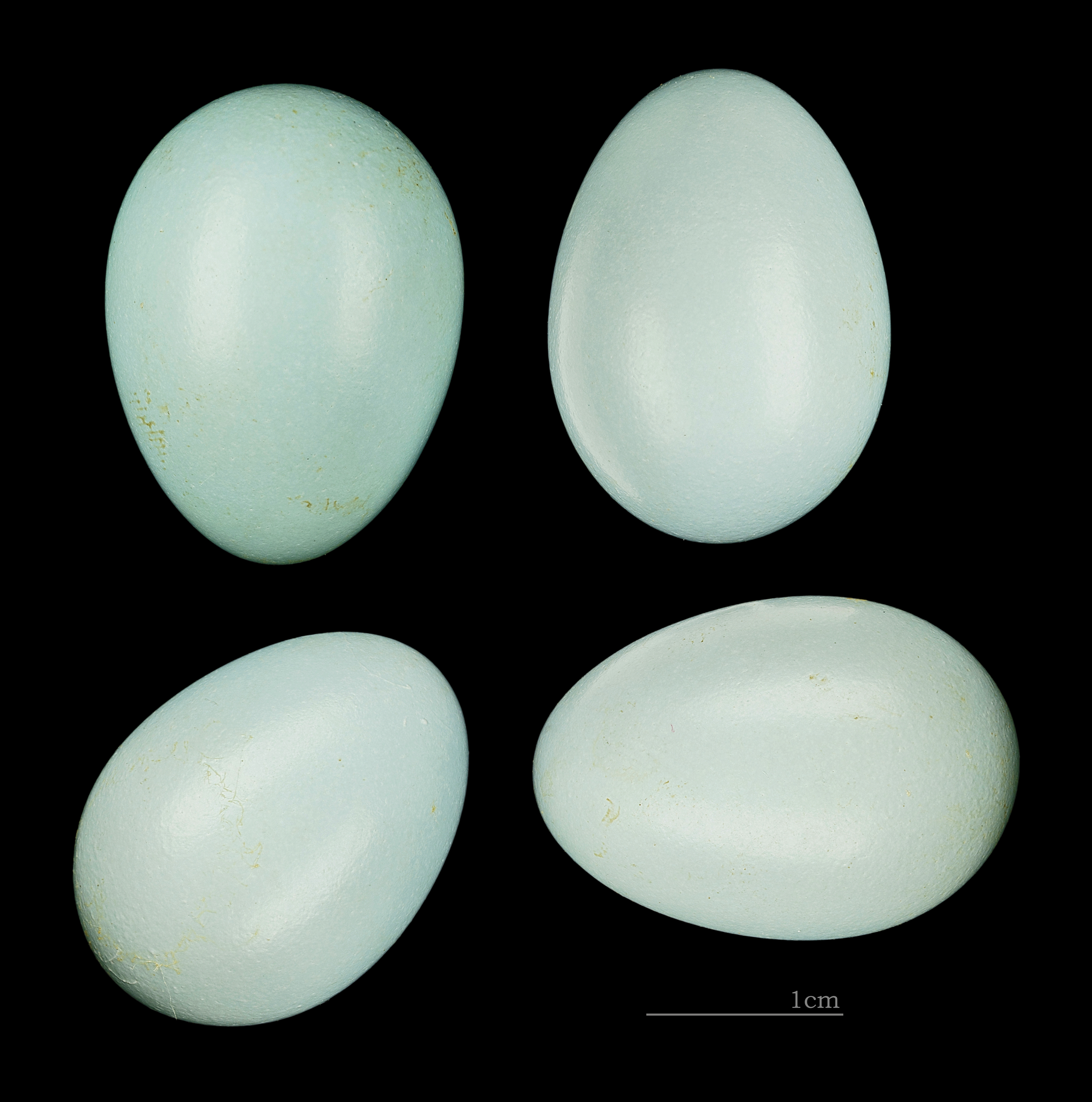
Eggs of Turdoides fulva fulva MHNT

The fulvous babbler (Argya fulva) is a species of bird in the family Leiothrichidae. It is found in Africa in and on the northwestern and southern fringes of the Sahara Desert and the Sahel region, occurring in Algeria, Chad, Egypt (extreme southeast), Eritrea, Ethiopia, Libya, Mali, Mauritania, Morocco, Niger, Nigeria, Senegal, Sudan, and Tunisia. Its natural habitat is subtropical or tropical dry shrubland.

== Description ==
It is 23–25 cm long with a wingspan of 27–30.5 cm. It is plain sandy brown above, with a whitish throat, and the rest of the underparts pale warm brown; the eye is dark, the bill greyish-black, and the legs pale brown.

== Taxonomy ==
The fulvous babbler was formerly placed in the genus Turdoides but following the publication of a comprehensive molecular phylogenetic study in 2018, it was moved to the resurrected genus Argya.

=== Subspecies ===
Four subspecies are accepted:

- Argya fulva maroccana (Lynes, H, 1925) — southern Morocco, adjacent Algeria, and southwestern Libya
- Argya fulva fulva (Desfontaines, RL, 1789) — northern Algeria to Tunisia and northwestern Libya
- Argya fulva buchanani (Hartert, EJO, 1921) — southeastern Algeria and Mali to Niger and central Chad
- Argya fulva acaciae (Lichtenstein, MHC, 1823) — northern Chad and Sudan to northern Eritrea

== Behaviour ==
Like other Argya babblers, it lives in flocks of typically 5–10 birds, which follow each other noisily with various churring and trilling sounds.
