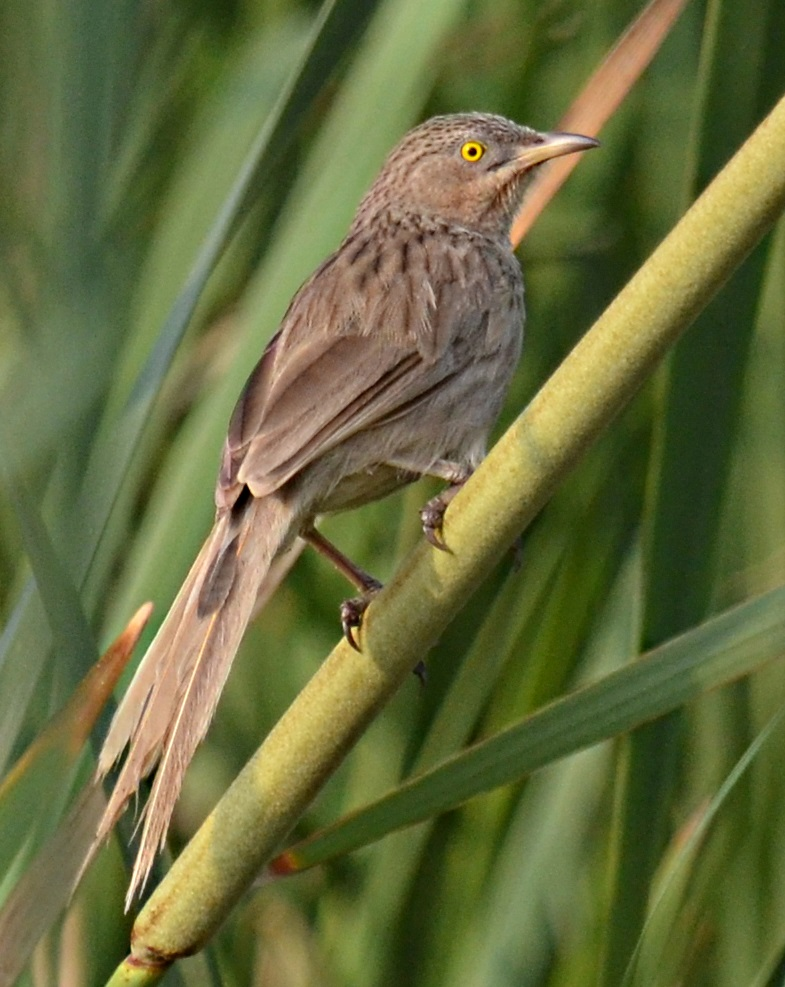
- at Mohali, Punjab

Conservation status
- Least Concern (IUCN 3.1)

Scientific classification
- Kingdom: Animalia
- Phylum: Chordata
- Class: Aves
- Order: Passeriformes
- Family: Leiothrichidae
- Genus: Argya
- Species: A. earlei

Binomial name
- Argya earlei (Blyth, 1844)

Synonyms
- Argya earlei; Argya earlii; Turdoides earlii; Turdoides earlei

= Striated babbler =

Species of bird

The striated babbler (Argya earlei) is a species of bird in the family Leiothrichidae. It is found in southern Asia from Pakistan to Myanmar.

This species was formerly placed in the genus Turdoides but following the publication of a comprehensive molecular phylogenetic study in 2018, it was moved to the resurrected genus Argya.

It is omnivorous.

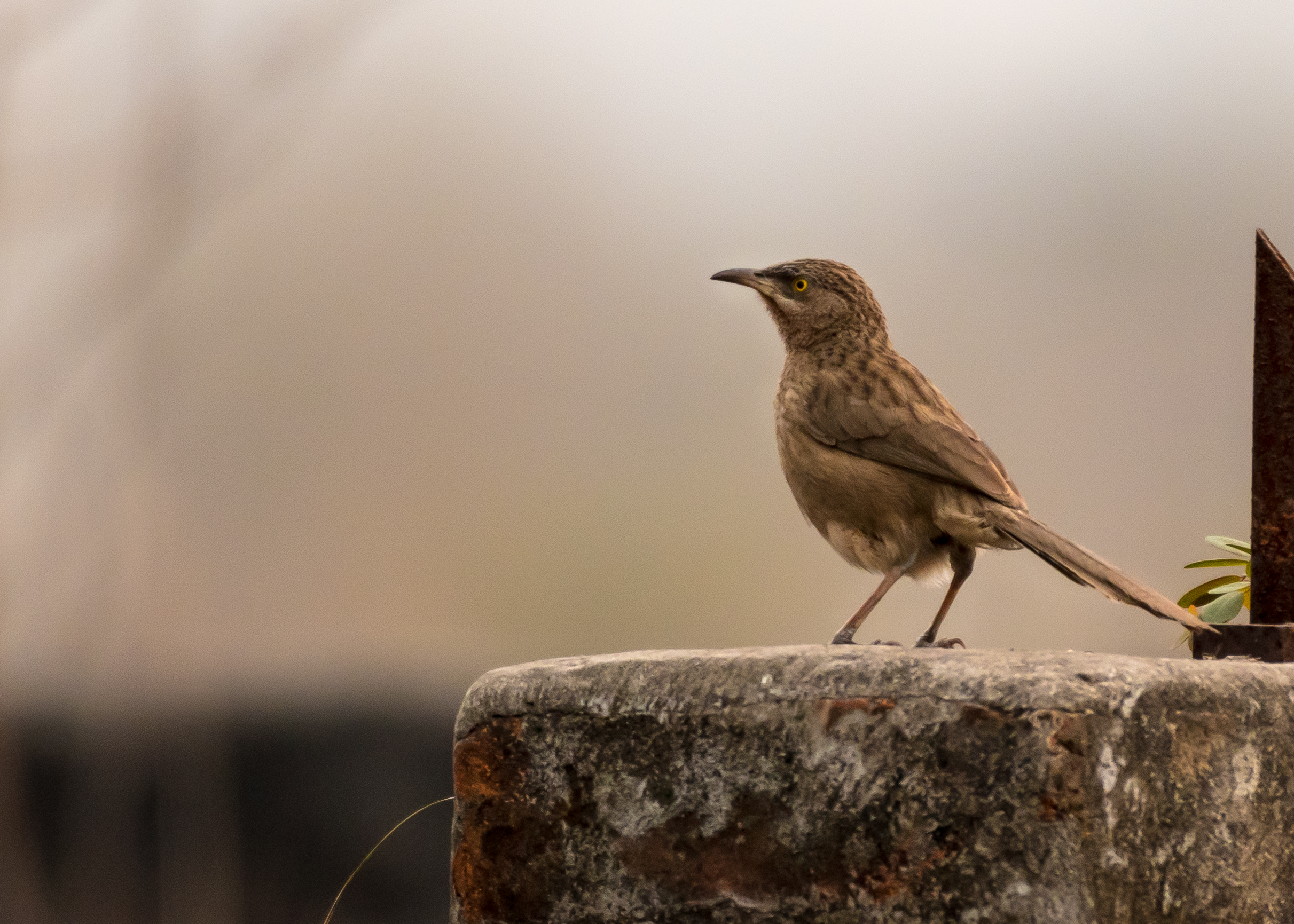
