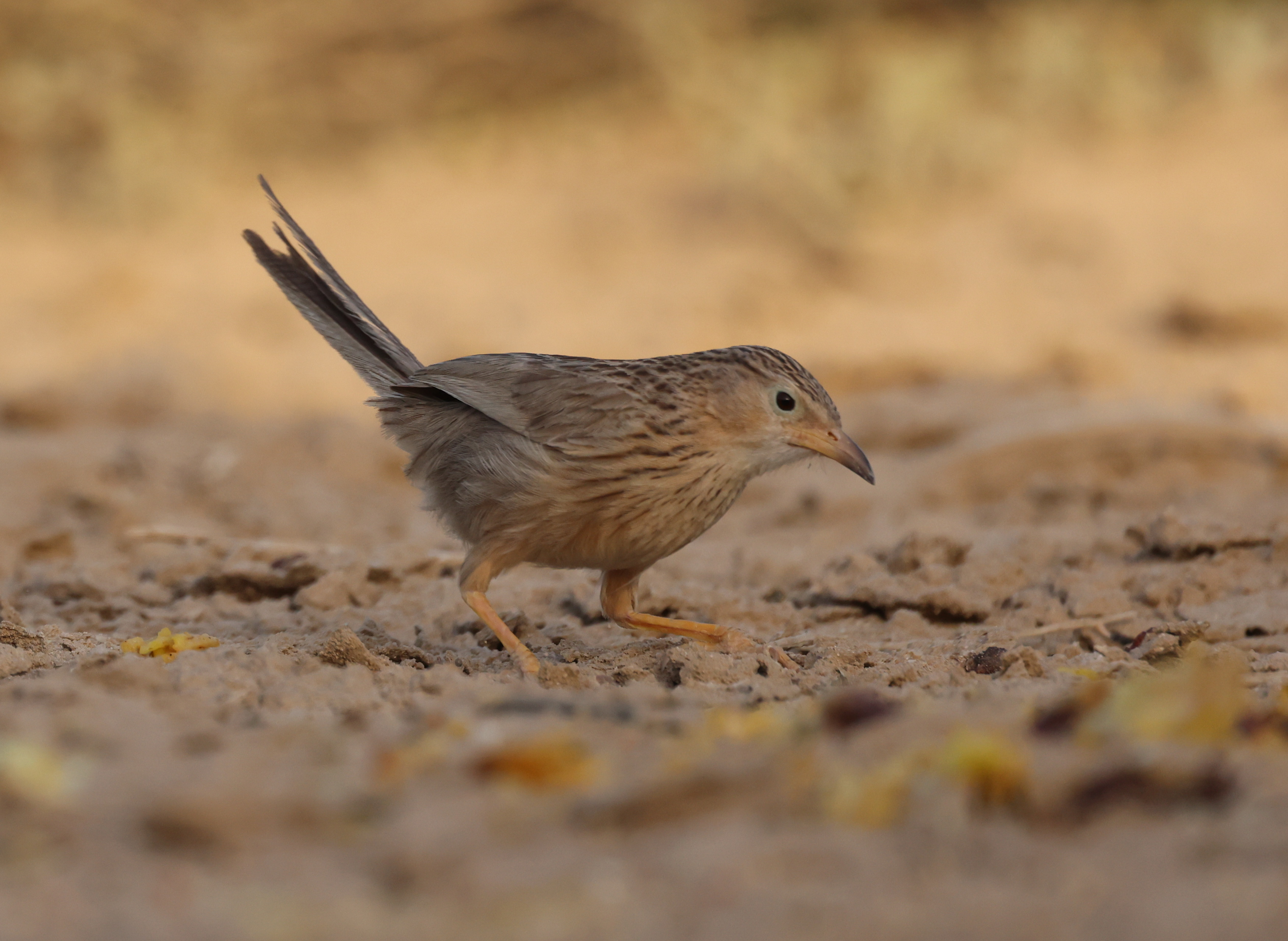
- A. h. salvadorii in Kuwait

Scientific classification
- Kingdom: Animalia
- Phylum: Chordata
- Class: Aves
- Order: Passeriformes
- Family: Leiothrichidae
- Genus: Argya
- Species: A. huttoni

Binomial name
- Argya huttoni (Blyth, 1847)

Synonyms
- Turdoides huttoni; Turdoides caudata huttoni; Argya caudata huttoni

= Afghan babbler =

Species of bird

The Afghan babbler (Argya huttoni) is a species of bird in the family Leiothrichidae. It is found from southeastern Iraq to south western Pakistan. It was formerly considered a subspecies of the common babbler A. caudata from further east in the Indian Subcontinent. Its distribution overlaps with the Iraq babbler A. altirostris, from which it is distinguished by its larger size, darker, more heavily streaked plumage, and occurrence in semi-desert and desert scrub, rather than reedbeds and wetlands.

Compared to the common babbler, the Afghan babbler has a heavier bill and darker streaks on the breast and sides. The calls and songs also differ.

== Taxonomy ==
The variation within the Afghan babbler is sometimes considered to be clinal but two subspecies are currently accepted:

- Argya huttoni salvadorii (De Filippi, 1865) — southeastern Iraq, northern Kuwait, and southwestern Iran
- Argya huttoni huttoni (Blyth, E, 1847) — southeastern Iran through southern Afghanistan east to extreme western Pakistan

The Afghan babbler was formerly placed in the genus Turdoides but following the publication of a comprehensive molecular phylogenetic study in 2018, it was moved to the resurrected genus Argya.

== Description ==
The Afghan babbler is similar to the other Argya babblers; it is 23.5–25 cm long, greyish brown above and paler below, with an indistinct paler throat. The plumage is more heavily streaked than the Iraq babbler, rather conspicuously streaked darker on the crown, back, and breast. The tail is long, and the wings short. The bill is blackish, and nearly straight to slightly downcurved (less curved than in Iraq babbler). The eyes are dark, and the legs pale yellowish-brown. The two subspecies differ in plumage tone, with A. h. huttoni generally paler overall, and A. h. salvadorii darker overall and more heavily streaked.

== Ecology and behaviour ==
It occurs mainly in desert and semi-desert scrub, but also uses cultivated land including gardens and irrigated crops. Its behaviour is very similar to that of other Argya babblers, living in small noisy flocks, the group making short flights 'follow my leader' style with weak fluttering flight.
