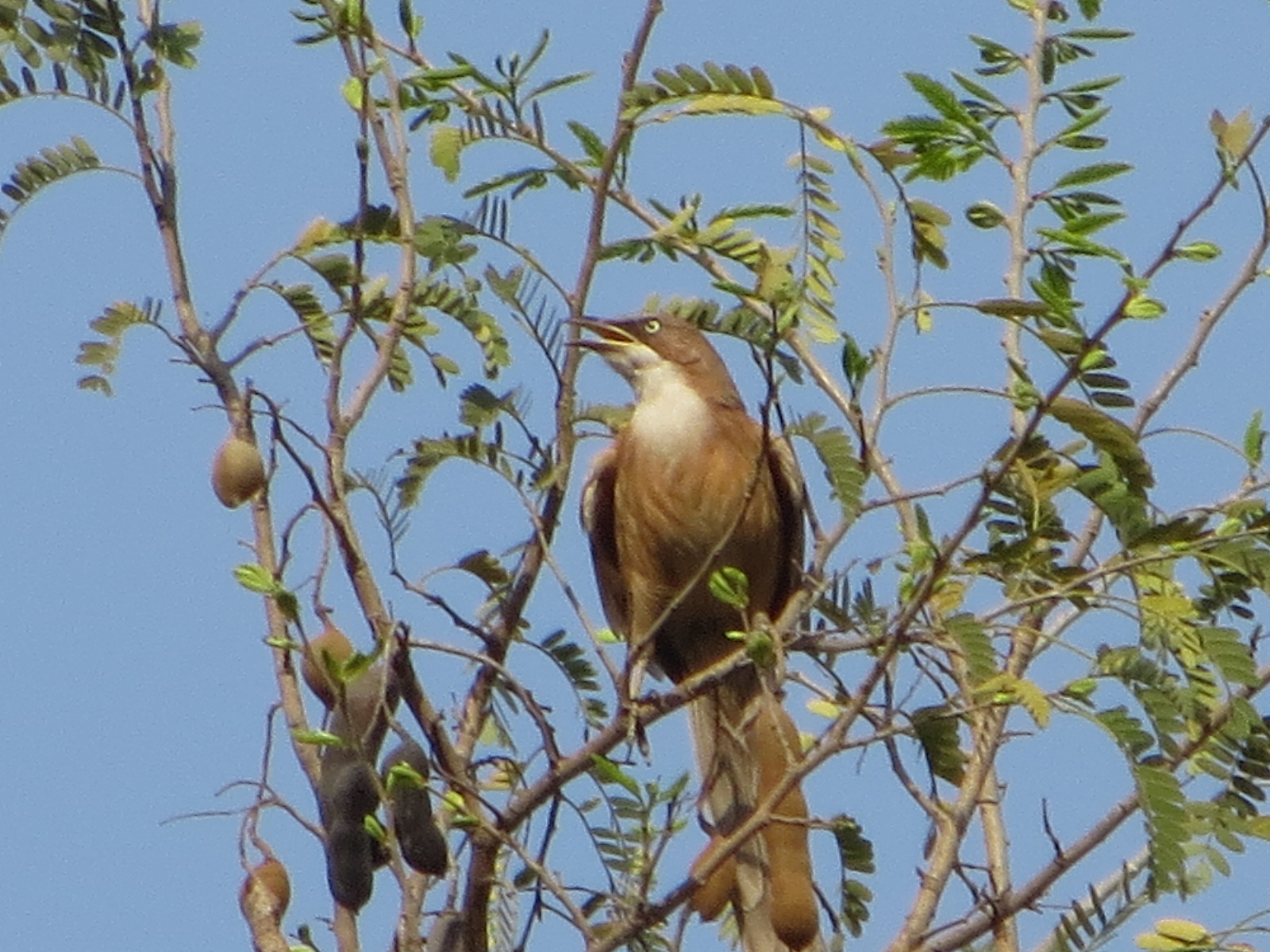

Conservation status
- Least Concern (IUCN 3.1)

Scientific classification
- Kingdom: Animalia
- Phylum: Chordata
- Class: Aves
- Order: Passeriformes
- Family: Leiothrichidae
- Genus: Argya
- Species: A. gularis

Binomial name
- Argya gularis (Blyth, 1855)

Synonyms
- Turdoides gularis; Chatarrhaea gularis

= White-throated babbler =

Species of bird

The white-throated babbler (Argya gularis) is a species of bird in the family Leiothrichidae. It is endemic to Myanmar.

This species was formerly placed in the genus Turdoides but following the publication of a comprehensive molecular phylogenetic study in 2018, it was moved to the resurrected genus Argya.
