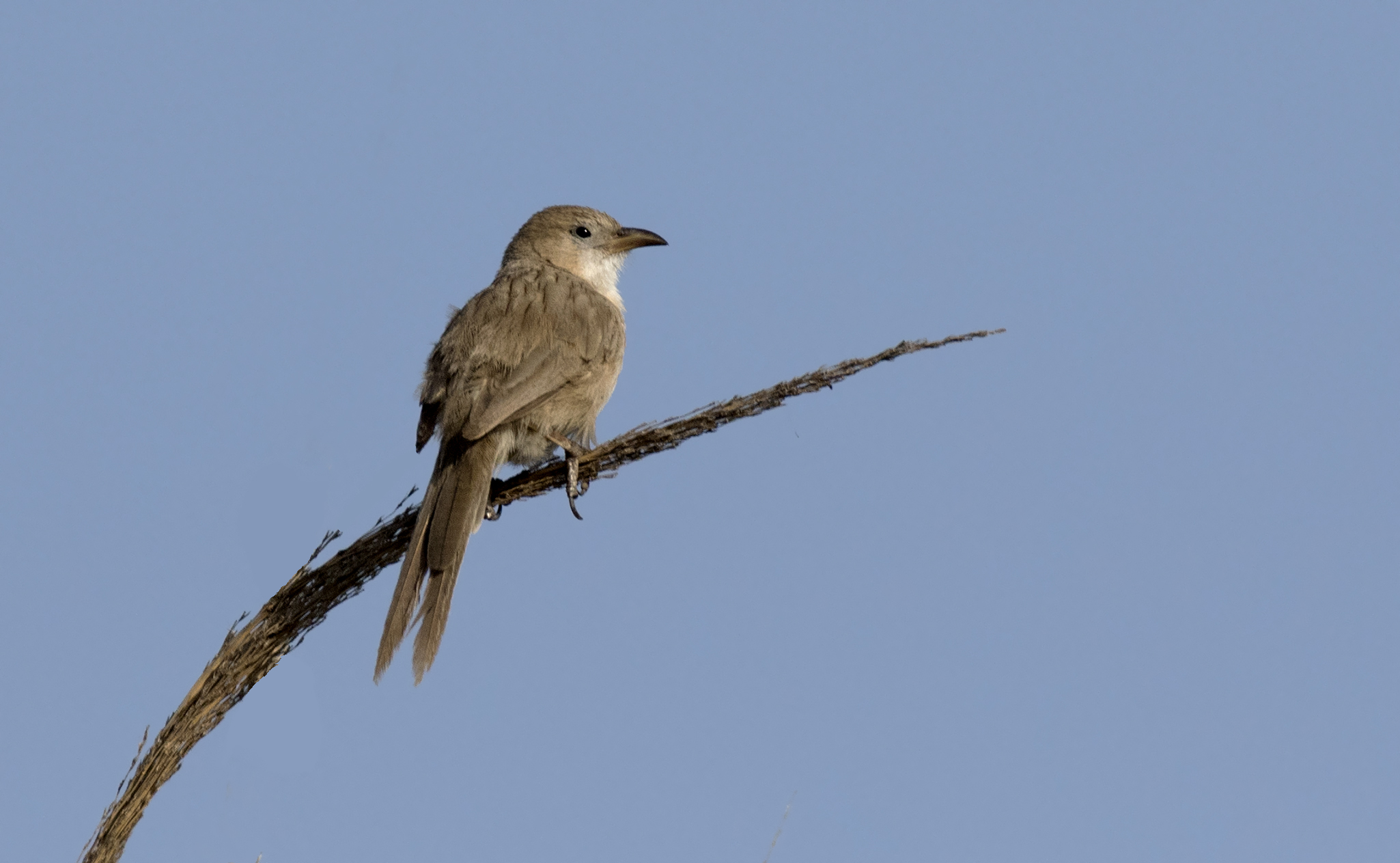

Conservation status
- Least Concern (IUCN 3.1)

Scientific classification
- Kingdom: Animalia
- Phylum: Chordata
- Class: Aves
- Order: Passeriformes
- Family: Leiothrichidae
- Genus: Argya
- Species: A. altirostris

Binomial name
- Argya altirostris (Hartert, 1909)

Synonyms
- Turdoides altirostris

= Iraq babbler =

Species of bird

The Iraq babbler (Argya altirostris) is a species of bird in the family Leiothrichidae, native to the reedbeds of Mesopotamia. It is found in Iraq, southwestern Iran, Syria, and southeastern Turkey. Its range overlaps with that of the Afghan babbler Argya huttoni, from which it is distinguished by its smaller size and use of wetland habitats.

Originally confined to the lower Euphrates and Tigris valleys in southern Iraq and adjacent western Iran, in recent decades it has spread north along the Euphrates through Syria, reaching the Birecik area of southeastern Turkey in 2006.

== Taxonomy ==
This species was formerly placed in the genus Turdoides but following the publication of a comprehensive molecular phylogenetic study in 2018, it was moved to the resurrected genus Argya.

Birds in the southeast of its range in the Basra area are slightly smaller, shorter-tailed, and darker than in the rest of the range, but are not currently considered distinct enough to be named as a separate subspecies.

== Description ==
The Iraq babbler is similar to other Argya babblers, though at 20–23 cm long, it is smaller than most. It is buffy brown to greyish brown above, and paler below, with a distinct whitish throat. The plumage is plainer than the Afghan babbler, only slightly rather than conspicuously streaked darker on the crown and breast. The tail is long, and the wings short. The bill is blackish, and slightly downcurved. The eyes are dark, and the legs dark brown.

== Ecology and behaviour ==
It is largely restricted to riverside reedbeds, also using adjacent trees and shrubs. Otherwise, its behaviour is very similar to that of other Argya babblers, living in noisy flocks of 10–20 or more birds, the group making short flights 'follow my leader' style with weak flight.
