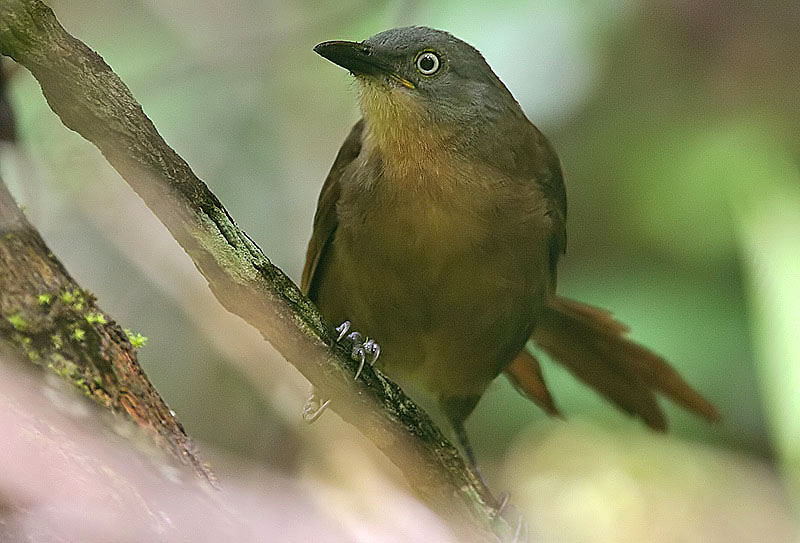
- In Sinharaja Forest Reserve in the south-west of Sri Lanka

Conservation status
- Vulnerable (IUCN 3.1)

Scientific classification
- Kingdom: Animalia
- Phylum: Chordata
- Class: Aves
- Order: Passeriformes
- Family: Leiothrichidae
- Genus: Argya
- Species: A. cinereifrons

Binomial name
- Argya cinereifrons (Blyth, 1851)

Synonyms
- Garrulax cinereifrons

= Ashy-headed laughingthrush =

Species of bird

The ashy-headed laughingthrush (Argya cinereifrons) is a member of the family Leiothrichidae. The laughingthrushes are a large family of Old World passerine birds characterised by soft fluffy plumage. These are birds of tropical areas, with the greatest variety in southeast Asia.

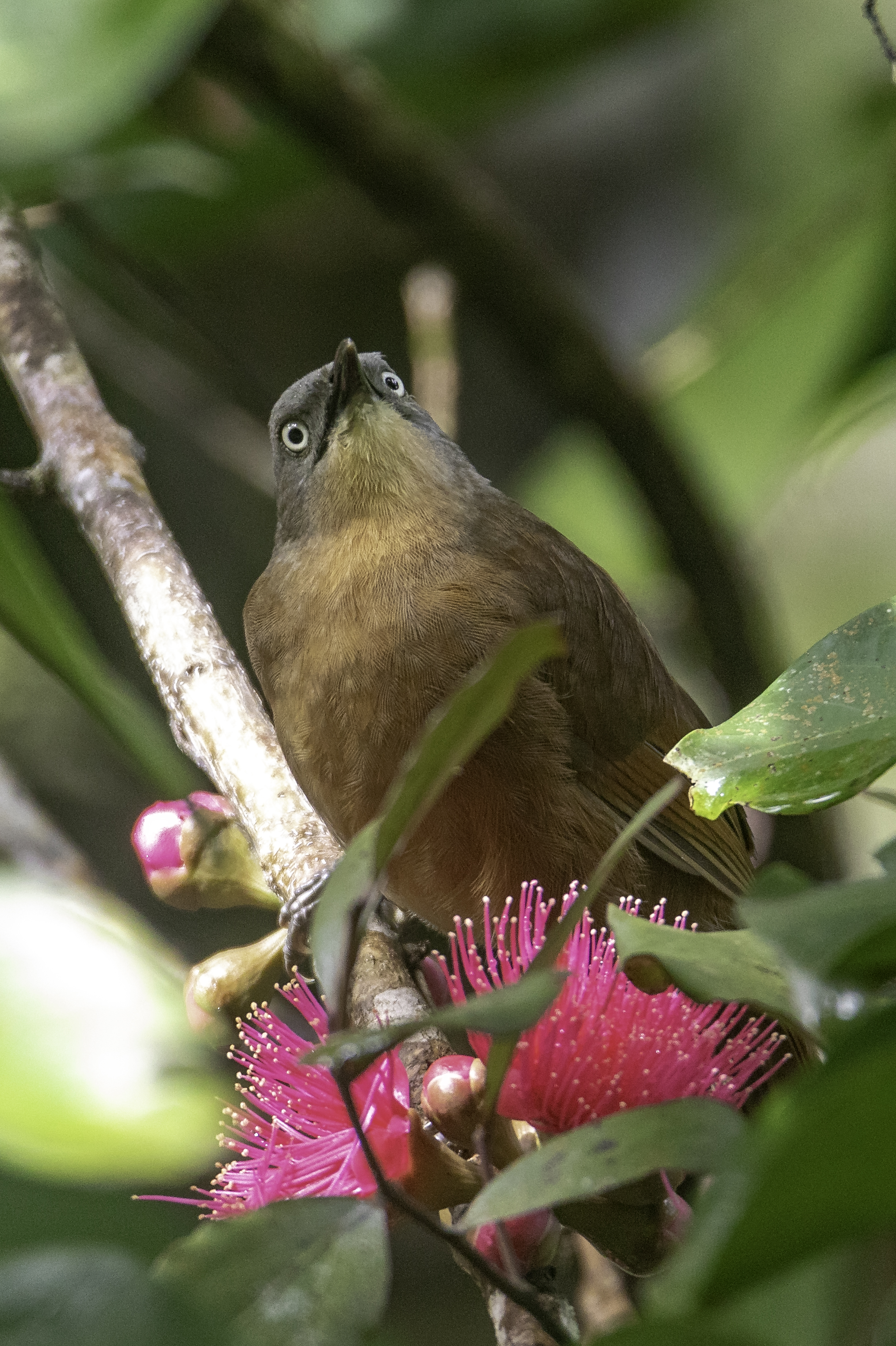
Ashy-headed laughingthrush in Sinharaja Forest Reserve

== Taxonomy ==
The ashy-headed laughingthrush was formerly placed in the genus Garrulax, but following the publication of an extensive molecular phylogenetic study in 2018, it was moved to the resurrected genus Argya.

== Description ==
The ashy-headed laughingthrush is a rangy bird, 23 centimetres (9 in) in length with a long floppy tail. It is rufous brown above and deep buff below, with a grey head and white throat. Like other babblers, these are noisy birds, and the characteristic laughing calls are often the best indication that they are present, since they are usually difficult to see in their preferred habitat.

== Distribution and habitat ==
The ashy-headed laughingthrush is a resident breeding bird endemic to Sri Lanka. Its habitat is rainforest, and it is rarely seen away from deep jungle or dense bamboo thickets in the wet zone. This species, like most babblers, is not migratory, and has short rounded wings and a weak flight.

Although its habitat is under threat, this laughingthrush occurs in all the forests of the wet zone, and is quite common at prime sites like Kitulgala and Sinharaja. It builds its nest in a bush, concealed in dense masses of foliage. The normal clutch is three or four eggs.

== Behaviour ==
As with other babbler species, ashy-headed laughingthrushes frequently occur in groups of up to a dozen, and are also often found in the mixed feeding flocks typical of tropical Asian jungle. They feed mainly on insects, but also eat jungle berries.

== In culture ==
In Sri Lanka, this bird is known as alu demalichcha ("ash-babbler") in Sinhala language. The ashy-headed laughingthrush appears on a 3 rupee Sri Lankan postal stamp.
