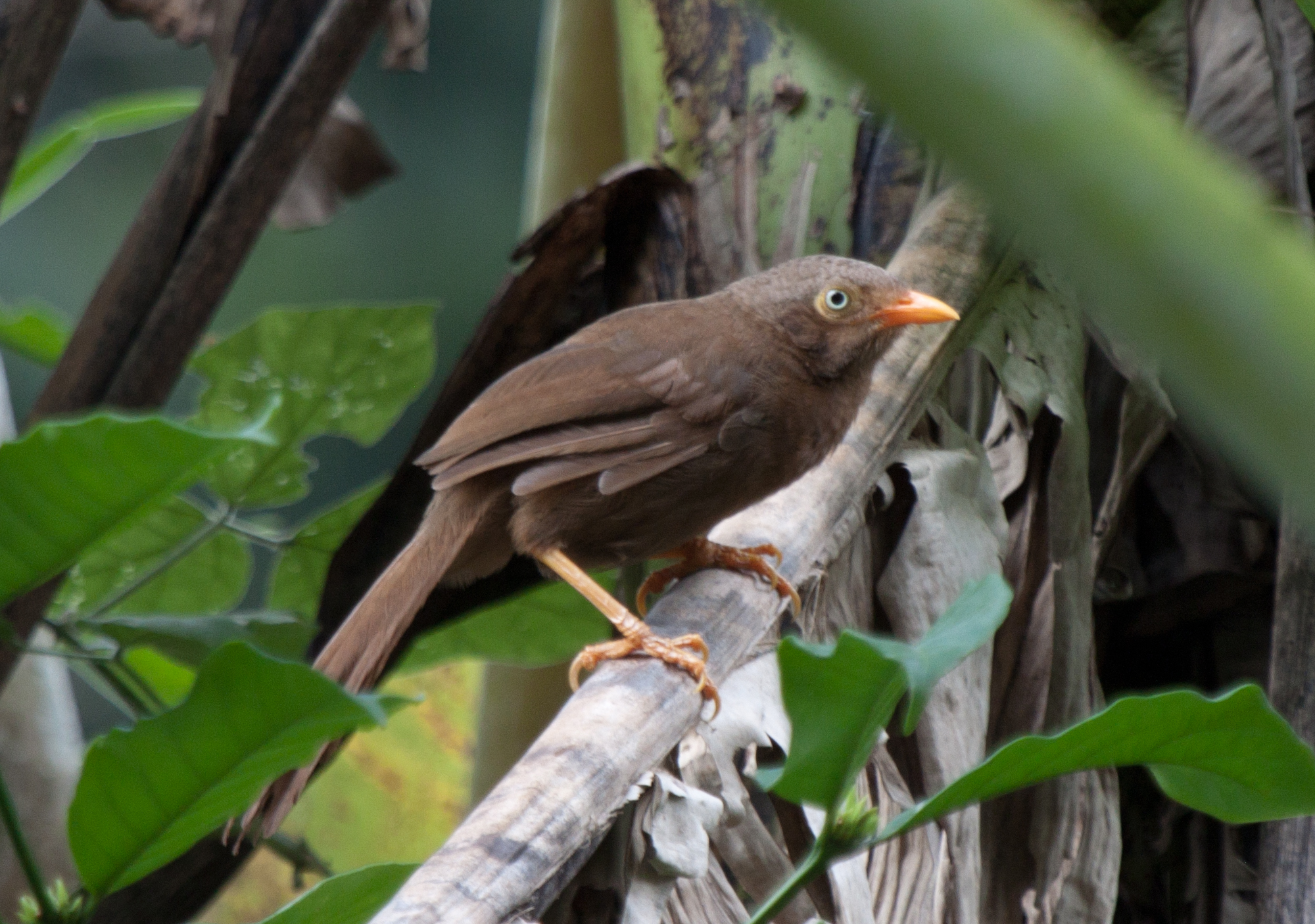
- at Kelani Forest Reserve, Sri Lanka

Conservation status
- Least Concern (IUCN 3.1)

Scientific classification
- Kingdom: Animalia
- Phylum: Chordata
- Class: Aves
- Order: Passeriformes
- Family: Leiothrichidae
- Genus: Argya
- Species: A. rufescens

Binomial name
- Argya rufescens (Blyth, 1847)
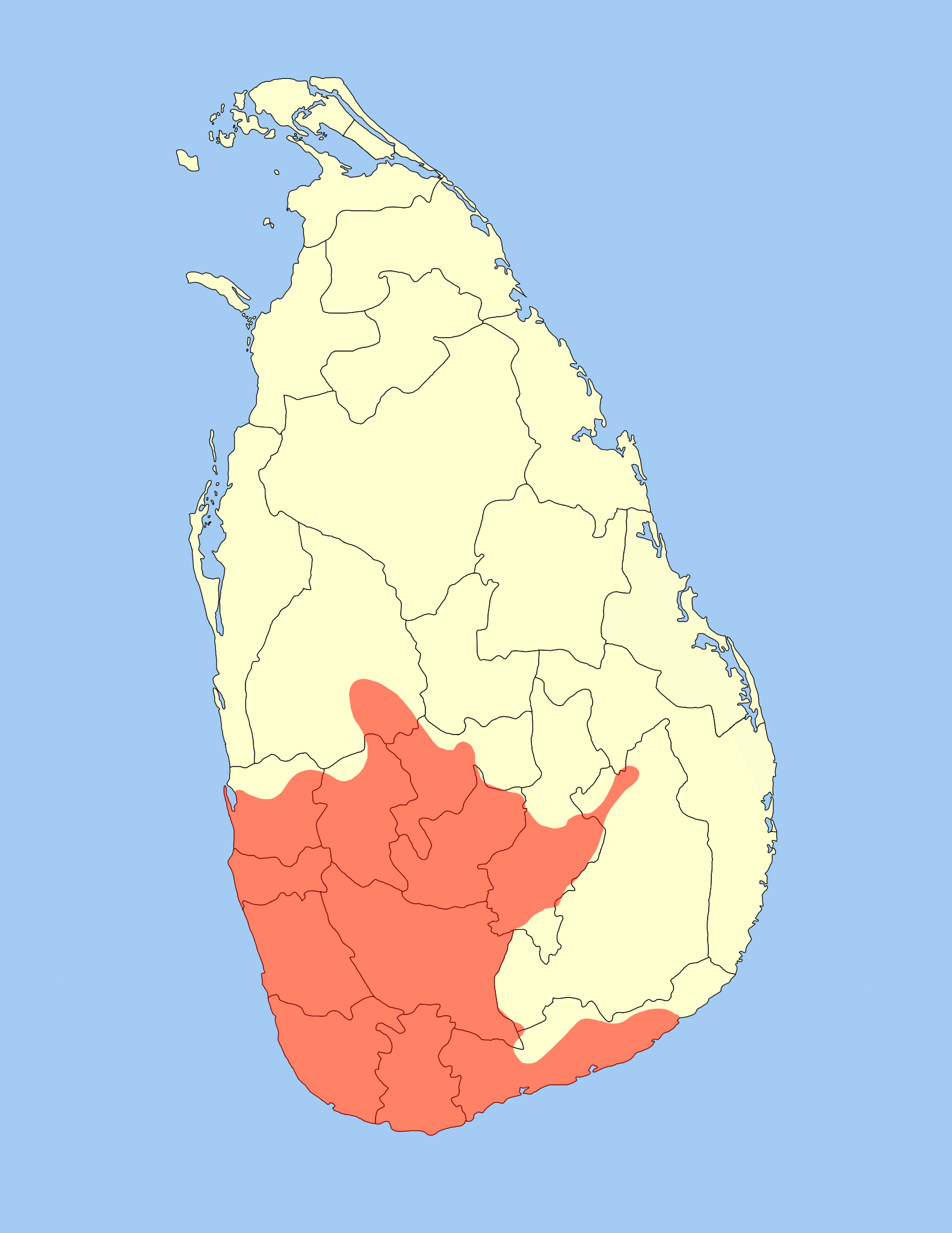

Synonyms
- Turdoides rufescens

= Orange-billed babbler =

Species of bird

The orange-billed babbler (Argya rufescens), also known as Ceylon rufous babbler or Sri Lankan rufous babbler, is a member of the family Leiothrichidae.

The orange-billed babbler is a resident breeding bird endemic to Sri Lanka. In the past, it was considered to be a race of jungle babbler, Argya striata.

Its habitat is rainforest, and it is rarely seen away from deep jungle. This species, like most babblers, is not migratory, and has short rounded wings and a weak flight.

Although its habitat is under threat, it occurs in all the forests of the wet zone, and is quite common at prime sites like Kitulgala and Sinharaja. It builds its nest in a tree, concealed in dense masses of foliage. The normal clutch is two or three deep greenish blue eggs.

These birds are plain orange brown below, and have a slightly darker shade above. The crown and nape are grey, and the bill is orange.

The orange-billed babbler lives in flocks of seven to ten or more. It is a noisy bird, and the presence of a flock may generally be known at some distance by the continual chattering, squeaking and chirping produced by its members. It is usually the first sign that a mixed-species feeding flock, so characteristic of Asian wet forests, is in the vicinity. It feeds mainly on insects, but also eats jungle berries.

== Taxonomy ==
The orange-billed babbler was formerly placed in the genus Turdoides, but following the publication of a comprehensive molecular phylogenetic study in 2018, it was moved to the resurrected genus Argya.

== In culture ==
In Sri Lanka, this bird is known as rathu demalichcha (translates to 'red babbler') in Sinhala language. This bird appears on a 10 rupee Sri Lankan postal stamp. It also appears on the 100 Sri Lankan rupee bank note (2010 series).
