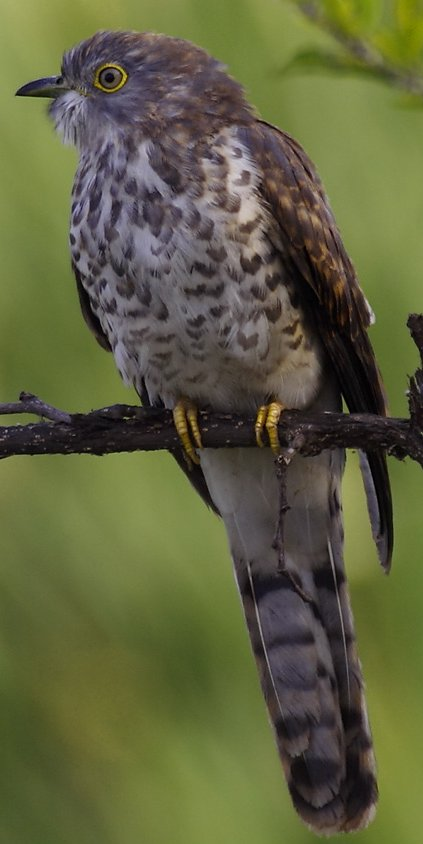
- Sub-adult

Conservation status
- Least Concern (IUCN 3.1)

Scientific classification
- Kingdom: Animalia
- Phylum: Chordata
- Class: Aves
- Order: Cuculiformes
- Family: Cuculidae
- Genus: Hierococcyx
- Species: H. varius

Binomial name
- Hierococcyx varius (Vahl, 1797)

Synonyms
- Cuculus varius Cuculus ejulans Sundevall, 1837

Audio
- Call

= Common hawk-cuckoo =

Species of bird

The common hawk-cuckoo (Hierococcyx varius), popularly known as the brainfever bird, is a medium-sized cuckoo resident in the Indian subcontinent. It bears a close resemblance to the shikra, even in its style of flying and landing on a perch. The resemblance to hawks gives this group the generic name of hawk-cuckoo; like many other cuckoos, these are brood parasites, laying their eggs in the nests of babblers. During their breeding season in summer males produce loud, repetitive three-note calls that are well-rendered as brain-fever, the second note being longer and higher pitched. These notes rise to a crescendo before ending abruptly and repeat after a few minutes; the calling may go on through the day, well after dusk and before dawn.

== Description ==
The hawk-cuckoo has evolved as a visual mimic of the shikra (right)

The common hawk-cuckoo is a medium- to large-sized cuckoo, about the size of a pigeon (ca. 34 cm). The plumage is ashy grey above; whitish below, cross-barred with brown. The tail is broadly barred. The sexes are alike. They have a distinctive yellow eye ring. Subadults have the breast streaked, similar to the immature shikra, and there are large brown chevron marks on the belly. At first glance they can be mistaken for a hawk. When flying they use a flap and glide style that resembles that of sparrowhawks (especially the shikra) and flying upwards and landing on a perch they shake their tails from side to side. Many small birds and squirrels raise the alarm just as they would in the presence of a hawk. The sexes are alike, but males tend to be larger.

They can be confused with the large hawk-cuckoo, which, however, has dark streaks on the throat and breast. Young birds have a pale chin, but young large hawk-cuckoos have a black chin.

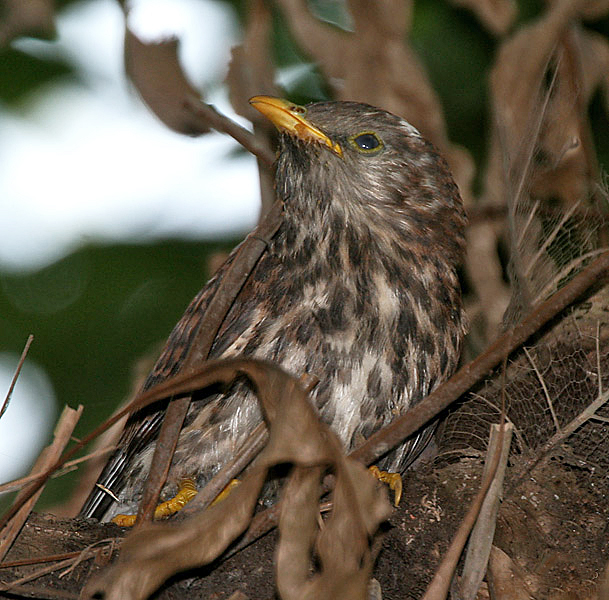
Immature with orange bill and indistinct eye-ring (Kolkata)

During summer months, before the monsoons, the males are easily detected by their repeated calls but can be difficult to spot. The call is a loud screaming three-note call, repeated 5 or 6 times, rising in crescendo and ending abruptly. It is heard throughout the day and frequently during moonlit nights. The calls of females are a series of grating notes. Common hawk-cuckoos feed mainly on insects and are specialised feeders that can handle hairy caterpillars. Caterpillar guts often contain toxins and like many cuckoos they remove the guts by pressing the caterpillar and rubbing it on a branch before swallowing it. The hairs are swallowed with the caterpillar and are separated in the stomach and regurgitated as a pellet.

== Taxonomy and systematics ==
The type locality of the species is Tranquebar in Tamil Nadu, once a Danish settlement and from where a specimen reached Martin Hendriksen Vahl who described the species in 1797. This species is placed under the genus Hierococcyx, which includes other hawk-cuckoos, but is sometimes included in the genus Cuculus. There are two subspecies, the nominate from India and ciceliae of the hill regions of Sri Lanka. The Indian population has paler plumage than ciceliae.

== Distribution ==
The common hawk-cuckoo occurs in most of the Indian subcontinent, from Pakistan in the west, across the Himalayas foothills, east to Nepal, Bhutan, Bangladesh and North East India and south into Sri Lanka. Some birds of the Indian population winter in Sri Lanka. In the hills of central Sri Lanka, ciceliae is a resident. It is generally resident but in high altitudes and in arid areas is locally migratory. It is found in the lower elevations (mostly below 1000m) of the Himalayas but in the higher areas, the large hawk-cuckoo tends to be more common.

The species is arboreal and rarely descends to the ground. Its habitat includes garden land, groves of tree, deciduous and semi-evergreen forests.

== Behaviour and ecology ==
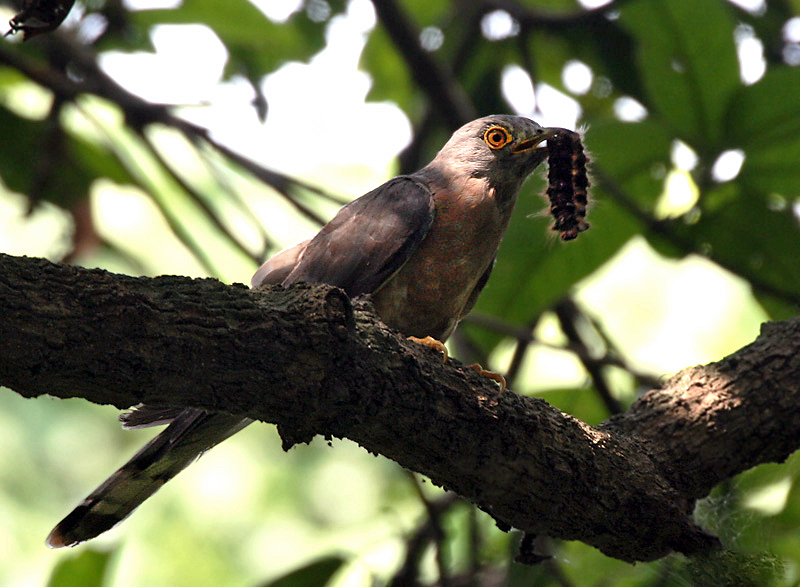
Feeding on a hairy caterpillar

Like many other cuckoos, this species is a brood parasite, preferring babblers mainly in the genus Turdoides (possibly the only host) and also reportedly on laughing-thrushes of the genus Garrulax.

Its breeding season is March to June, coinciding with that of some of the Turdoides babblers. A single egg is laid in each nest, blue, like that of the host. The hatchling usually evicts the eggs of its host and is reared to maturity by foster parents, following them for nearly a month. T C Jerdon noted that it may not always evict the host and that young birds may be seen along with young babblers. When moving with a flock of babblers the chick makes a grating kee-kee call to beg for food and the foster parents within the group may feed it. The predominant host species in India are Turdoides striatus and Turdoides affinis. Hawk-cuckoos also parasitise the large grey babbler Turdoides malcolmi. In Sri Lanka, their host is Turdoides striatus.

Parasitic eye-worms in the genus Oxyspirura have been found in the orbital cavity of the species.

== In culture ==
The call of this bird has been popularly transcribed as brain-fever in English (in some old books, this name is also incorrectly used for the Asian koel). Frank Finn noted that [H]is note, however, fully entitles him to his ordinary designation, whether from its "damnable iteration" or from its remarkable resemblance to the word "brain-fever" repeated in a piercing voice running up the scale. Inglis used the transcription: "O lor’ ! O lor' ! how very hot it’s getting—we feel it, we feel it, we feel it." Other interpretations of the bird call include piyaan kahan in Hindi ("where's my love") or chokh gelo (in Bengali, "my eyes are gone") and paos ala (Marathi, "the rains are coming"). In Bodo, the call sounds like "haab fisha houwa", which means dear son (where are you).

The call "Pee kahan" or "Papeeha" is more accurately represented by the shrill screaming "pi-peeah" of the large hawk-cuckoo Hierococcyx sparverioides, which replaces the brainfever bird along the Himalayas and its foothills.

The brainfever bird's call may be heard all through the day, starting early before dawn and frequently during moonlit nights. A novel by the Indian author Allan Sealy is named after this bird.

== Other sources ==
- Whistler, H (1918). "The Common Hawk-Cuckoo Hierococcyx varius in the Punjab". Journal of the Bombay Natural History Society. 26 (1): 287.
- Osmaston, AE (1912). "Eggs of the Large Hawk-Cuckoo Hierococcyx sparverioides". Journal of the Bombay Natural History Society. 21 (4): 1330–1331.
- Umar, M (1977). "On the onset of brain-fever". Newsletter for Birdwatchers. 17 (2): 9.
- Himmatsinhji, MK (1980). "The Common Hawk-Cuckoo, Cuculus varius Vahl in Kutch". Journal of the Bombay Natural History Society. 77 (2): 329.
- Waite, HW (1963). "The Common Hawk-Cuckoo (Cuculus varius varius Vahl) in the Punjab". Journal of the Bombay Natural History Society. 60 (1): 260.
- Gay, Thomas (1976). "Onset of 'brain-fever'". Newsletter for Birdwatchers. 16 (3): 15.
- Mohan, D (1976). "Onset of brainfever". Newsletter for Birdwatchers. 16 (5): 11.
- Ramamoorthi, MS (1976). "Onset of Brainfever". Newsletter for Birdwatchers. 16 (5): 9–11.
- Gay, T (1988). "First calls of the Common Hawk Cuckoo". Newsletter for Birdwatchers. 28 (3–4): 16.
