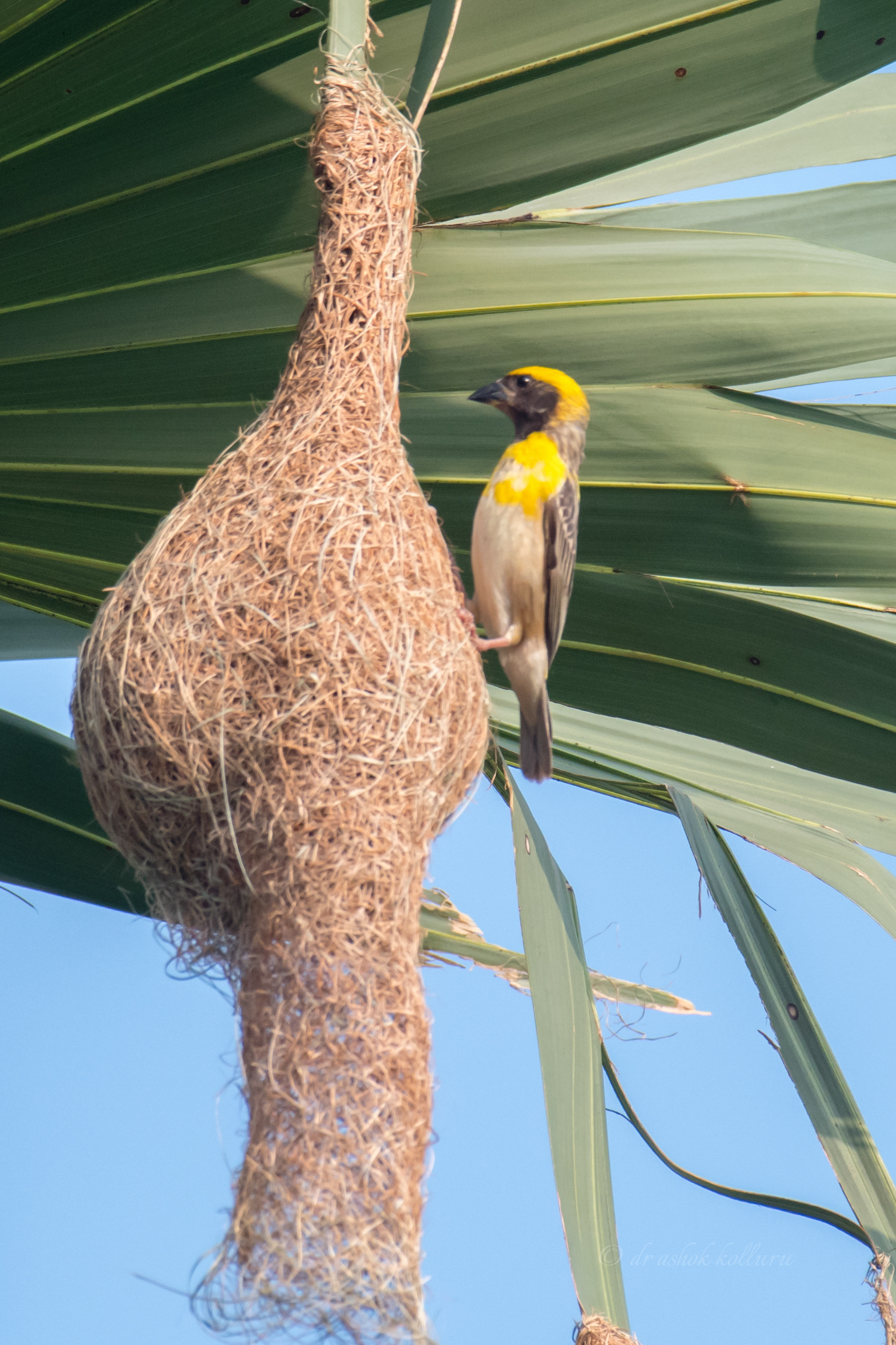
- Male P. p. philippinus at nest, Visakhapatnam, Andhra Pradesh
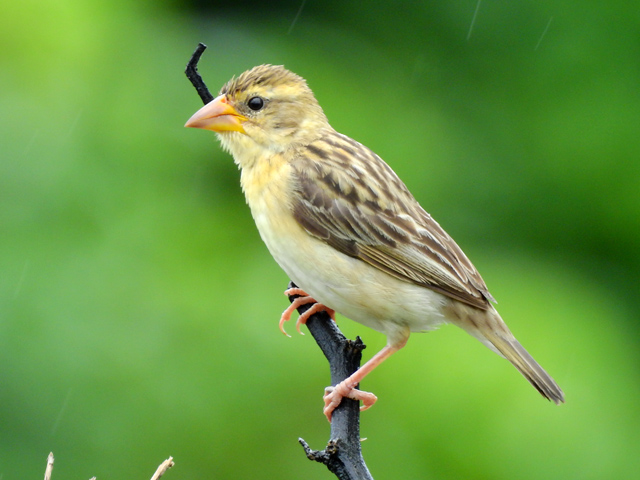
- Female P. p. philippinus, Maharashtra, India

Conservation status
- Least Concern (IUCN 3.1)

Scientific classification
- Kingdom: Animalia
- Phylum: Chordata
- Class: Aves
- Order: Passeriformes
- Family: Ploceidae
- Genus: Ploceus
- Species: P. philippinus

Binomial name
- Ploceus philippinus (Linnaeus, 1766)
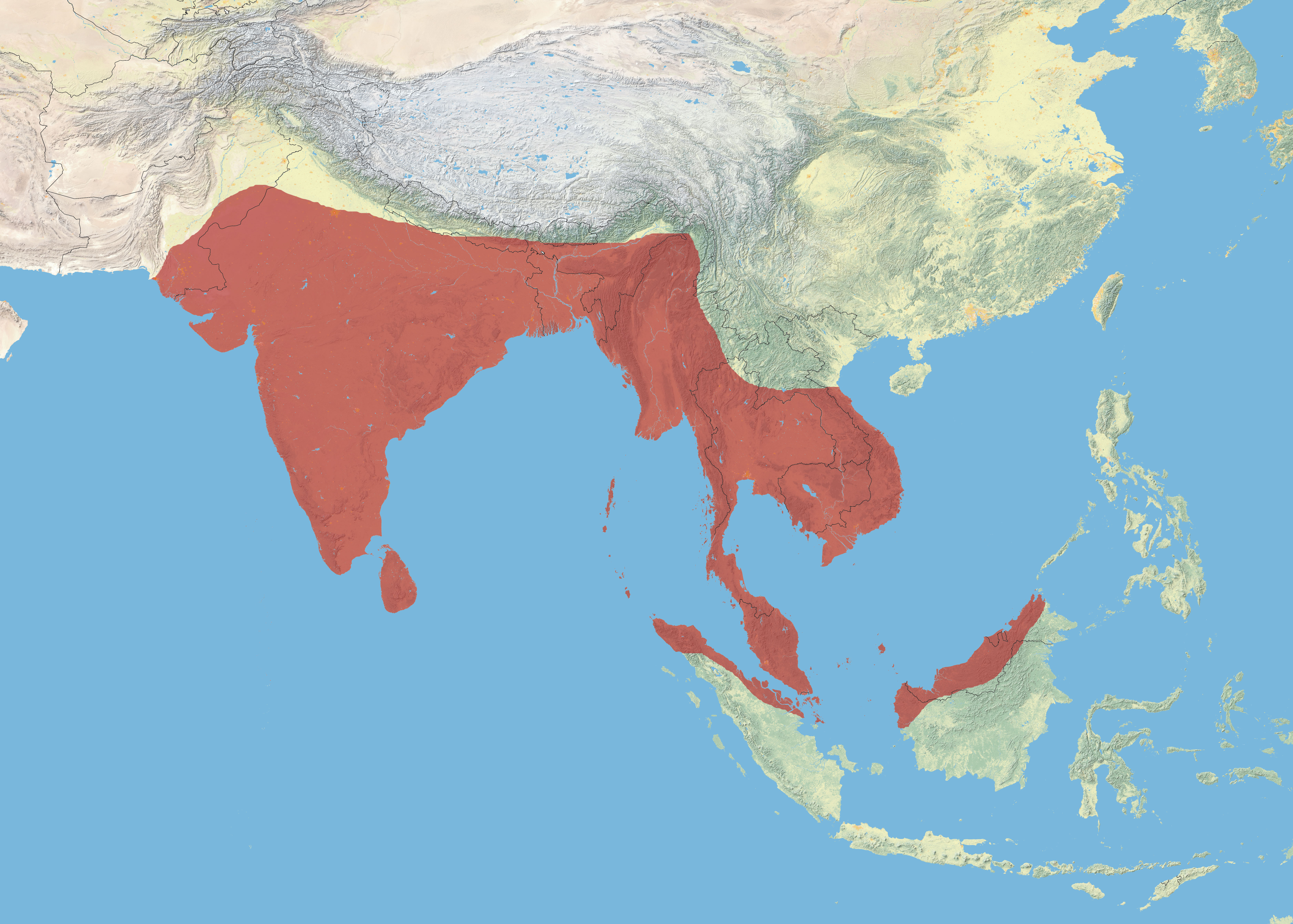
- approximate distribution

Synonyms
- Loxia philippina Linnaeus, 1766

= Baya weaver =

Species of bird found in southeast Asia

The baya weaver (Ploceus philippinus) is a weaverbird found across the Indian subcontinent and Southeast Asia. Flocks are found in grasslands, cultivated areas, scrub and secondary growth. They are known for their hanging retort shaped nests woven from leaves, usually found on thorny trees or palm fronds, near or hanging over water where predators cannot easily reach. They are widespread and common within their range and are prone to local, seasonal movements in response to rain and food availability.

Five subspecies are recognised. The nominate race P. p. philippinus is found through much of mainland India while P. p. burmanicus is found eastwards into Southeast Asia. The population in southwest India is darker above and referred to as subspecies P. p. travancoreensis.

== Taxonomy ==
In 1760, French zoologist Mathurin Jacques Brisson described the baya weaver in his Ornithologie based on a specimen he believed, incorrectly, to have been collected in Philippines. He used the French name Le gros-bec des Philippines and the Latin Coccothraustes Philippensis. Brisson's Latin names do not conform to the binomial system and are not recognised by the International Commission on Zoological Nomenclature. In 1776, Carl Linnaeus updated his Systema Naturae for the twelfth edition, including the baya weaver for which he coined the binomial name Loxia philippina. It was subsequently realised that Brisson was mistaken in believing that his specimen came from the Philippines and the type locality was redesignated as Sri Lanka. This species is now placed in the genus Ploceus that was introduced by the French naturalist Georges Cuvier in 1816.

There are five subspecies:

- P. p. philippinus (Linnaeus, 1766) – Pakistan, India (except southwest and northeast), Sri Lanka and south Nepal
- P. p. travancoreensis Ali & Whistler, 1936 – southwest India
- P. p. burmanicus Ticehurst, 1932 – Bhutan, northeast India and Bangladesh through Myanmar to southwest China
- P. p. angelorum Deignan, 1956 – Thailand and south Laos
- P. p. infortunatus Hartert, 1902 – south Vietnam, Malay Peninsula, Borneo and Sumatra, Java and Bali

== Description ==
These are sparrow-sized (15 cm [5.9 in]) and in their non-breeding plumage, both males and females resemble female house sparrows. They have a stout conical bill and a short square tail. Non-breeding males and females look very similar: dark brown streaked fulvous buff above, plain (unstreaked) whitish fulvous below, eyebrow long and buff coloured, bill is horn coloured and no mask. Breeding males have a bright yellow crown, dark brown mask, blackish brown bill, upper parts are dark brown streaked with yellow, with a yellow breast and cream buff below.

== Behaviour and ecology ==
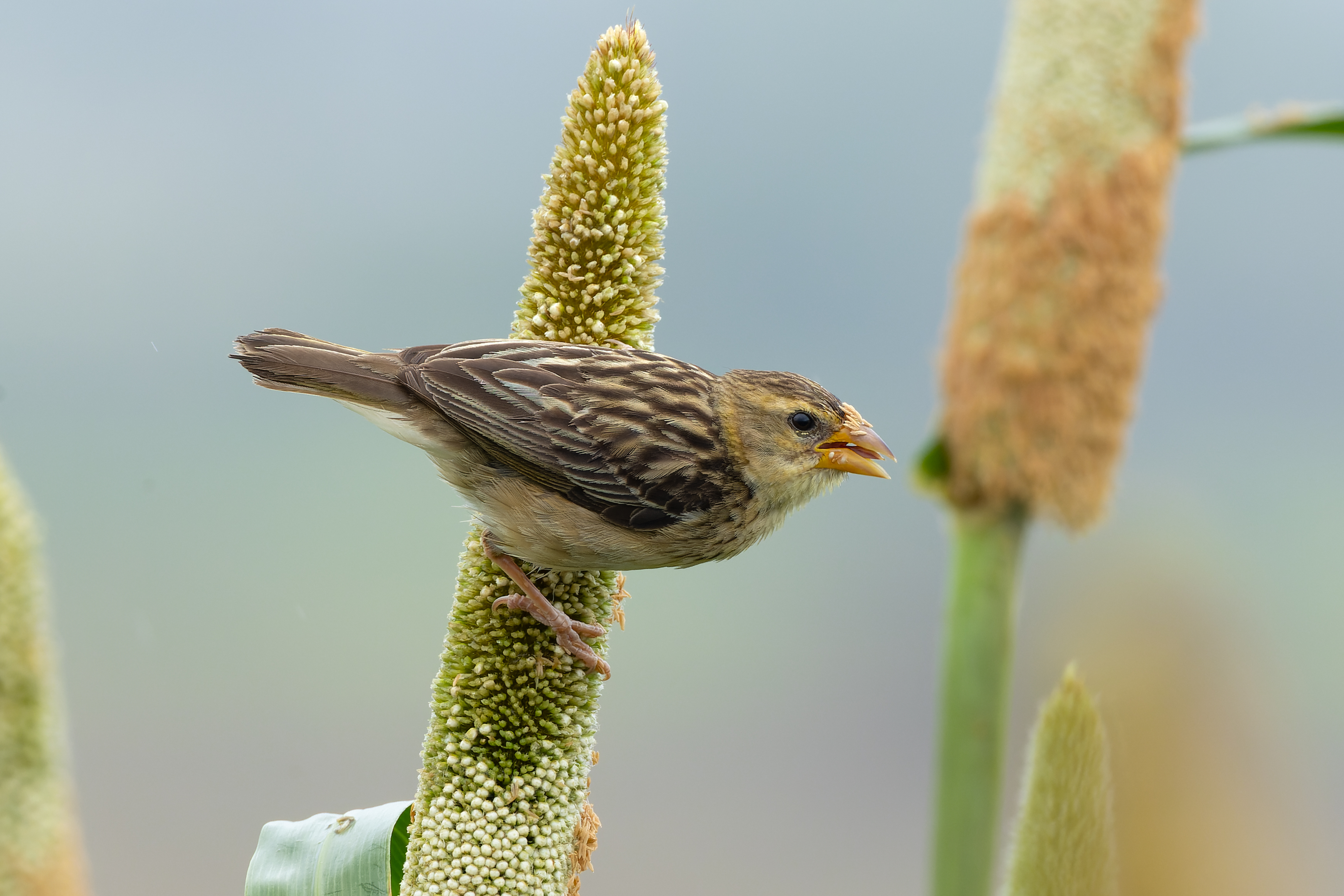
Ploceus philippinus eating Pearl millet in Bhigwan, Maharashtra, India.

Baya weavers are social and gregarious birds. They forage in flocks for seeds, both on the plants and on the ground. Flocks fly in close formations, often performing complicated manoeuvres. They glean paddy and other grain in harvested fields, and are sometimes considered pests for occasionally damaging ripening crops. They roost in reed-beds bordering waterbodies. They depend on wild grasses such as Guinea grass (Panicum maximum) as well as crops like rice for both their food (feeding on seedlings in the germination stage as well as on early stages of grain) and nesting material. They also feed on insects including butterflies, sometimes taking small frogs, geckos and molluscs, especially to feed their young. Their seasonal movements are governed by food availability. Their calls are a continuous chit-chit-... sometimes ending in a wheezy cheee-eee-ee that is produced by males in a chorus. A lower intensity call is produced in the non-breeding season.

They occasionally indulge in dust bathing.

In captivity, individuals form stable peck orders.

=== Breeding ===
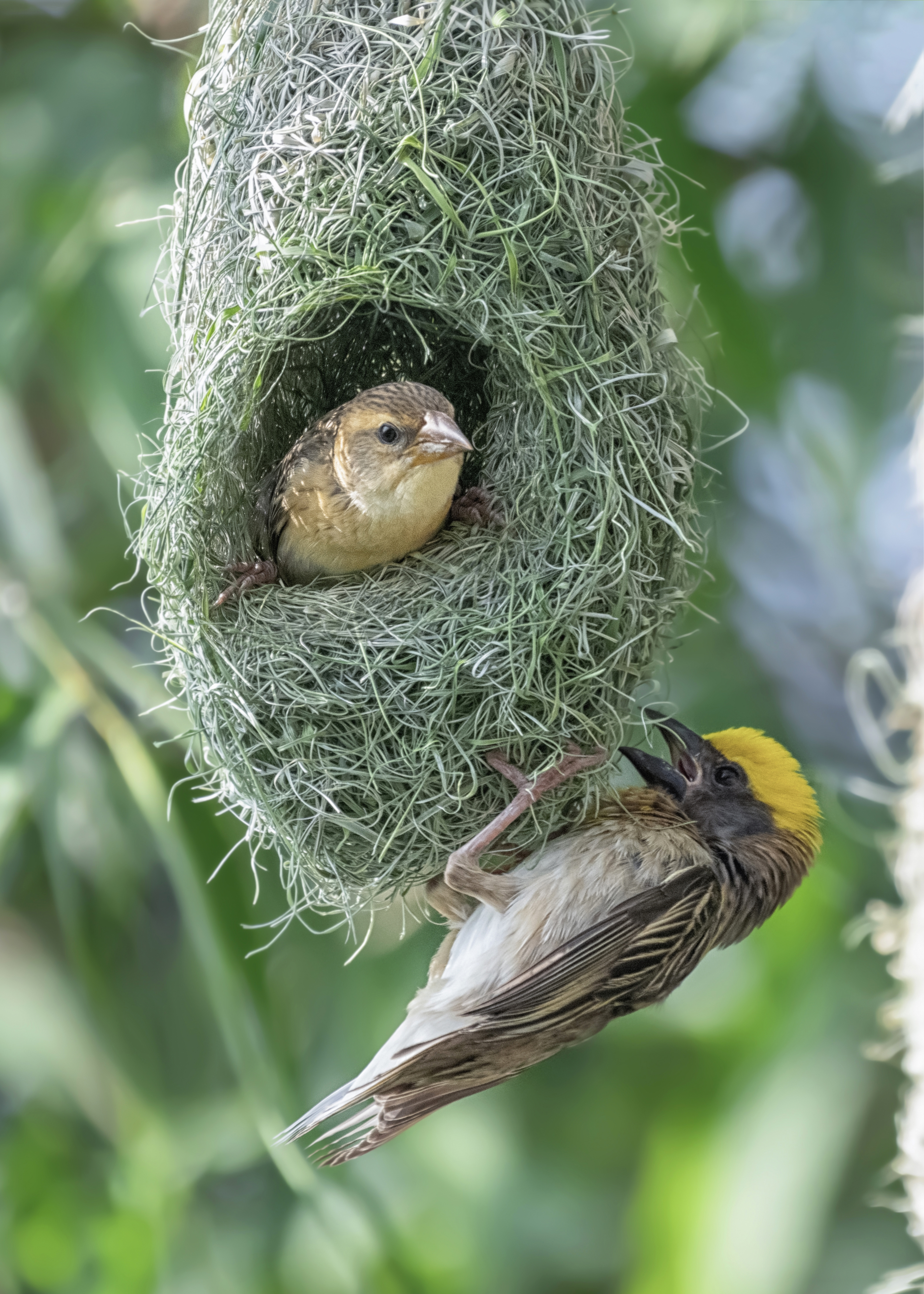
Baya weaver (male) building its nest (female inside the nest)

The breeding season is during the monsoons. Breeding condition is initiated by environmental conditions including day length, and comes to an end in late summer. This post-reproductive "photorefractoriness", in which photoperiodic birds cease to respond reproductively to the stimulation of long days, can end spontaneously without having been exposed to short days for four to six months unlike temperate birds. They nest in colonies typically of up to 20–30, close to sources of food, nesting material, and water. The males construct the nests, which are elaborately woven, pendulous, and retort-shaped, with a long vertical tube leading to a side entrance to the central nesting chamber. The birds use their strong beaks to cut, collect, weave, and knot strips of between 20 and 60 cm (7.9 and 23.6 in) from paddy leaves, rough grasses, and palm fronds, making up to 500 trips to complete a nest. Blobs of mud or dung are added to the interior of the nest chamber, which it has been suggested may help to stabilise the nest in strong winds. The nests are often suspended over water from thorny acacias, palm trees (mainly Phoenix sylvestris), and sometimes from telephone wires and avenue trees in urban areas. Nests are often located on the eastern side of the tree, where they are believed to provide shelter from the Southwest Monsoon, although late breeders are more likely to build their nests in other orientations. Abandoned nests are sometimes used by mice (Mus booduga) and other birds such as munias.

Nests are usually built in colonies but isolated nests are not unknown. Young males may build experimental nests among reeds. In Burma, nests are often built under the eaves of buildings, but this is uncommon in India. The males take about 18 days to construct the complete nest with the intermediate "helmet stage" taking about eight days. The nests are partially built before the males begin to display to passing females by flapping their wings and calling while hanging from their nests. The females inspect the nest and signal their acceptance of a male, whereupon the male completes the nest by adding the entrance tunnel. Males are almost solely in charge of nest building, though females may give finishing touches, particularly to the interior by adding blobs of mud. Location is more important than structure for the female, preferring nests high in trees, over dry land, and on thin branches.

Both males and females are polygamous. Males build many partial nests and begin courting females. The male finishes the nest only after finding a mate. The female lays about two to four white eggs and incubates them for about 14 to 17 days. Males may sometimes assist in feeding the chicks. The chicks leave the nest after about 17 days. After mating, the male typically courts other females at other partially constructed nests. Intraspecific brood parasitism is known, whereby females may lay eggs in the nests of others. Young birds leave the nest in juvenile plumage, which is replaced in their first moult after about four to six months. The young disperse to new locations up to two kilometres away from their origin. Females are capable of breeding after a year while males take half a year longer. There are two moults per year, a prenuptial moult prior to breeding and a second moult after breeding. There is increased lipid metabolism in the crown region of males during the breeding season. Lipids are involved in the transport of the yellow carotenoid pigments that form the crown and are subsequently metabolized.

Despite the protection of thorns and hanging over water, nest predation by crows is not unusual. Broods may also be destroyed by lizards such as Calotes versicolor or rodents such as Vandeleuria oleracea which may take over the nest. Nests are sometimes taken over and used for nesting by munias and Indian silverbills (Euodice malabarica).

== In culture ==
A widespread folk belief in India is that the baya sticks fireflies with mud to the nest walls to light up the interior of the nest at night.

In earlier times, the baya weaver was trained by street performers in India for entertainment. They could pick up objects at the command of their trainers. They were trained to fire toy cannons, string beads, pick up coins and other objects. According to Edward Blyth "the truth is, that the feats performed by trained Bayas are really very wonderful, and must be witnessed to be fully credited. Exhibitors carry them about, we believe, to all parts of the country; and the usual procedure is, when ladies are present, for the bird, on a sign from its master, to take a sweetmeat in its bill, and deposit it between a lady's lips, and repeat this offering to every lady present, the bird following the look and gesture of its master. A miniature cannon is then brought, which the bird loads with coarse grains of powder...." Robert Tytler noted demonstrations where the bird would twirl a thin stick with fires at the ends over its head. These uses have been noted from the time of Akbar.

The baya is like a wild sparrow but yellow. It is extremely intelligent, obedient and docile. It will take small coins from the hand and bring them to its master, and will come to a call from a long distance. Its nests are so ingeniously constructed as to defy the rivalry of clever artificers.

— Āīn (trans. Jarrett), iii. 122. (ca. 1590) quoted in the Hobson Jobson

=== Local names ===
Túkúra Sorai (Assamese: টোকোৰা চৰাই); baya, son-chiri (Hindi); bayya chirya (Urdu: بیّا چڑیا ); ବାୟା ଚଢ଼େଇ (Odia); sugaran (Marathi); tempua (Malay); sughari (Gujarati); বাবুই (babui) (Bengali); parsupu pita, gijigadu/gijjigadu గిజిగాడు (Telugu); gijuga ಗಿಜುಗ (Kannada); thukanam kuruvi, ആറ്റക്കുരുവി (Malayalam); thukanan-kuruvi, தூக்கணாங்குருவி (Tamil); wadu-kurulla, tatteh-kurulla, goiyan-kurulla (Sinhala); sa-gaung-gwet, sar-buu-daung စာဗူးတောင်း (Burmese); bijra (Punjabi: ਬਿਜੜਾ ); suyam (Chota Nagpur), bagra(Maithili). संस्कृतम् (सुगृहः/चञ्चूसूचकः) Marathi (सुगरण पक्षी)

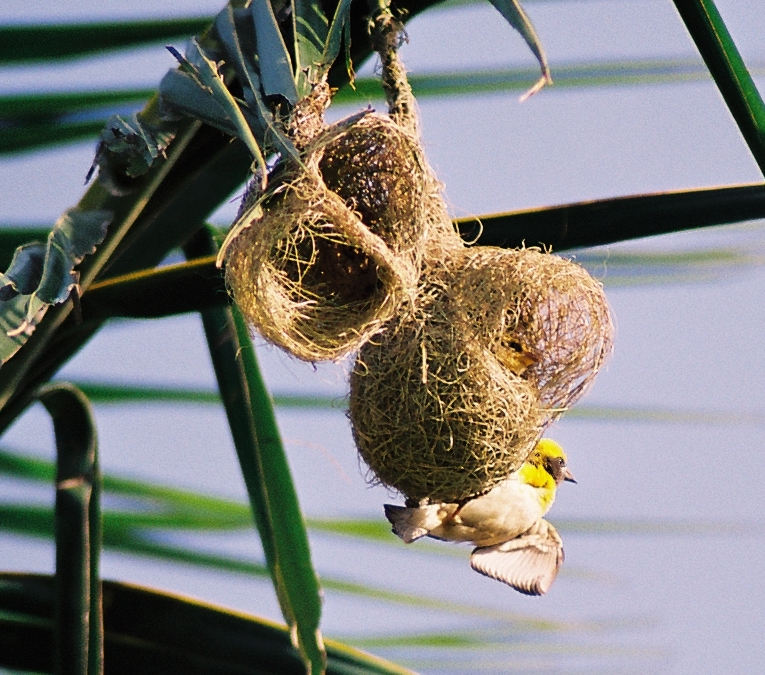
Male P. p. philippinus displaying at nest

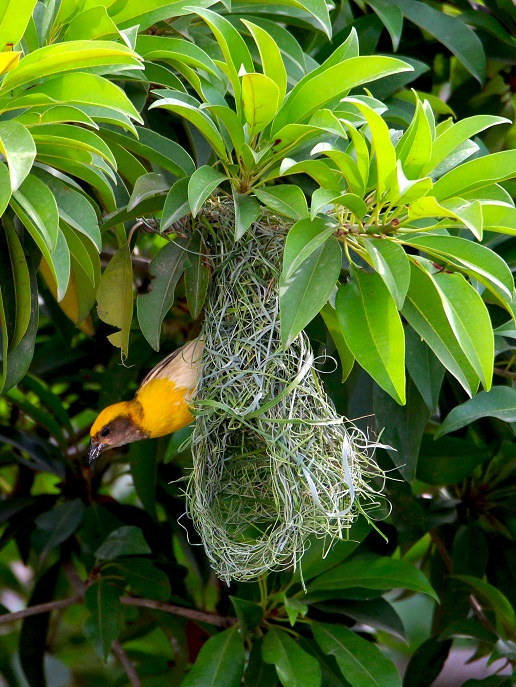
Weaverbird at nest, West Bengal, India

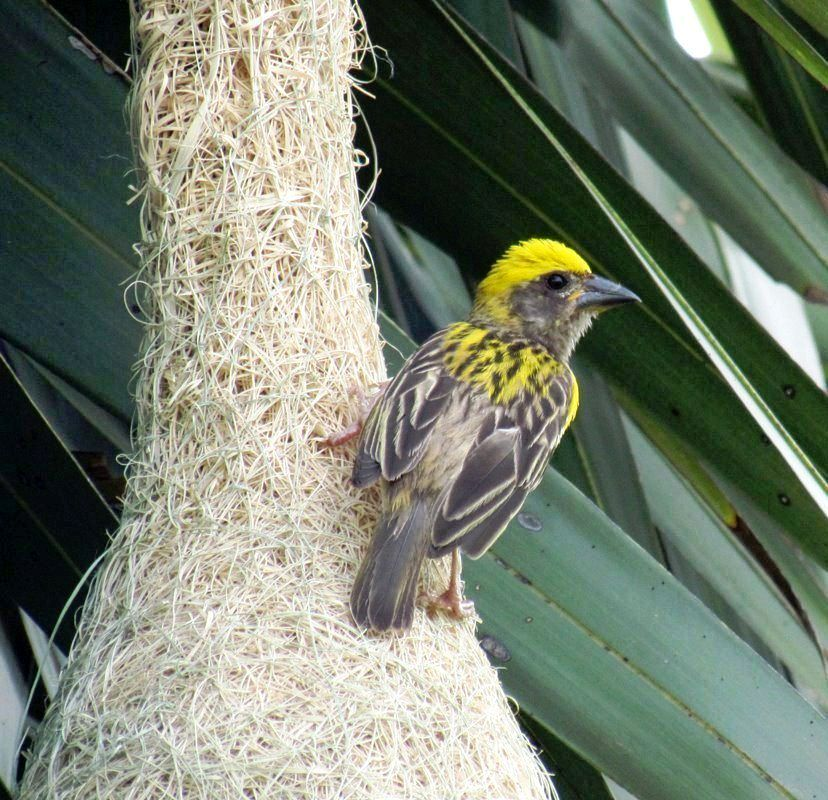
Male perched on his nest in southern India

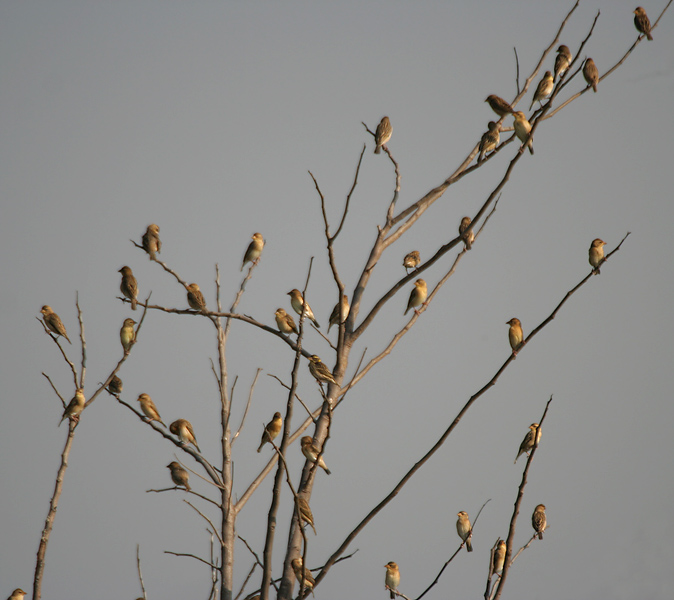
A winter flock

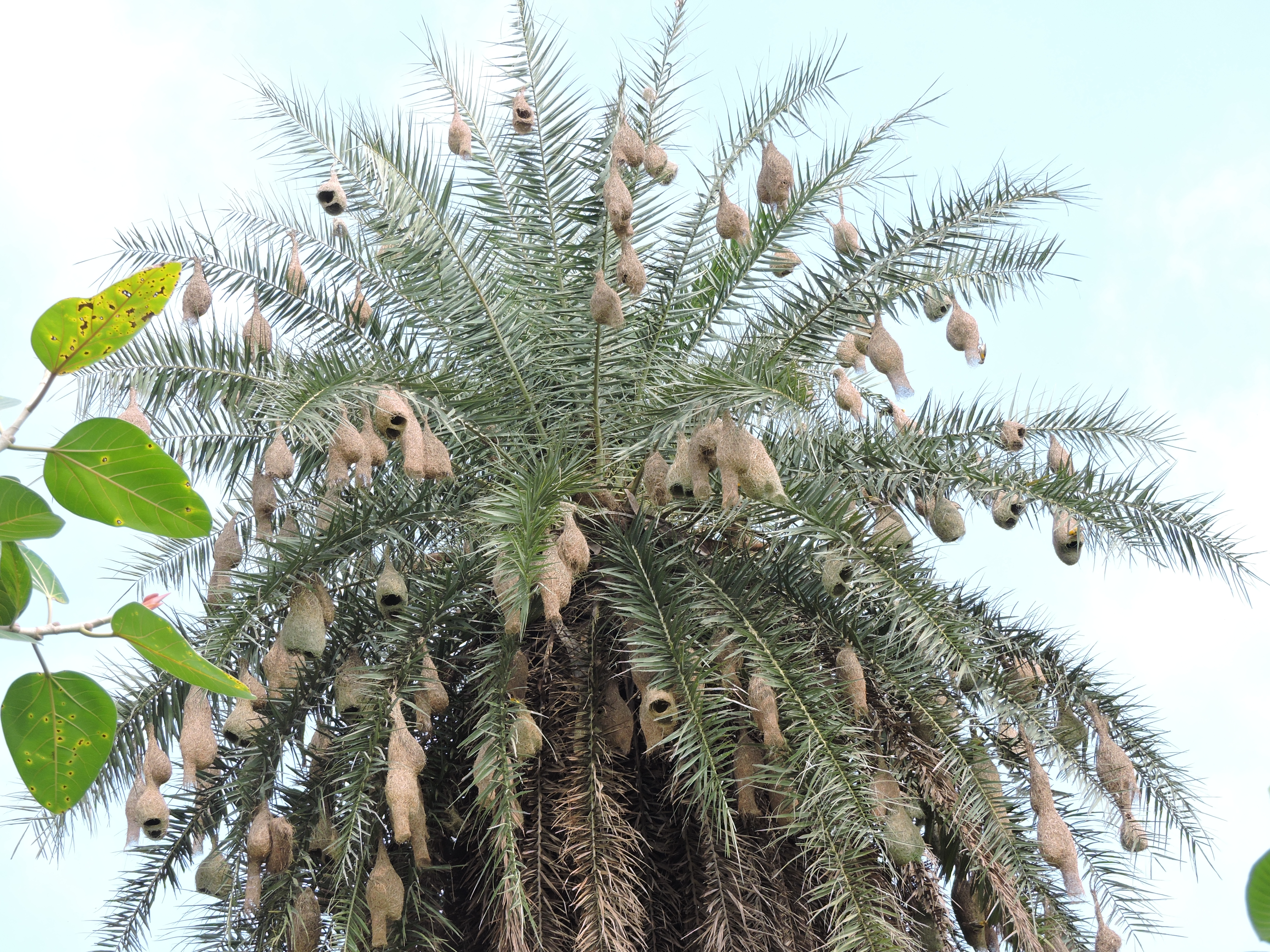
Nests hanging from palm (Phoenix sp.) fronds

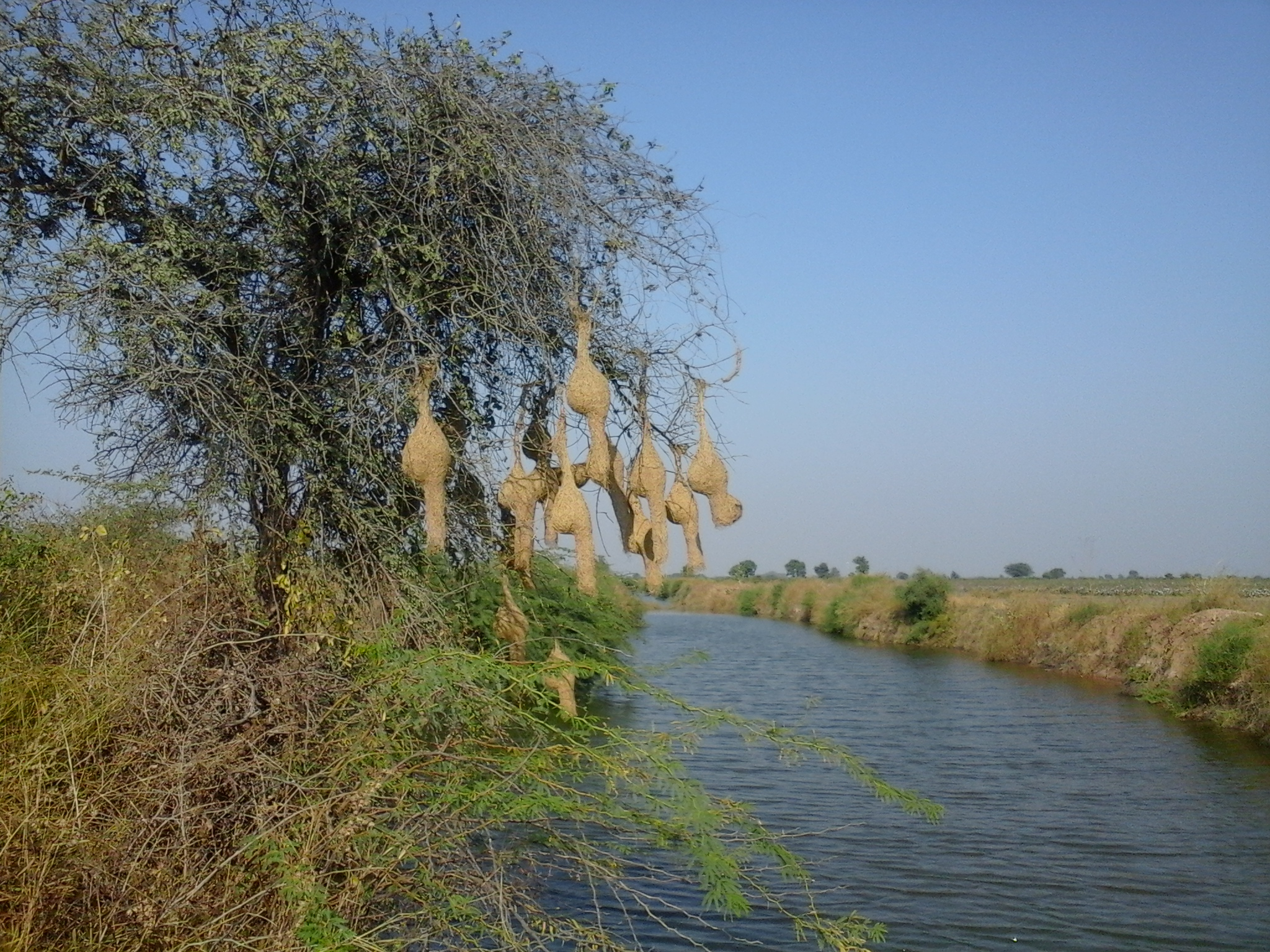
Nests overhanging water

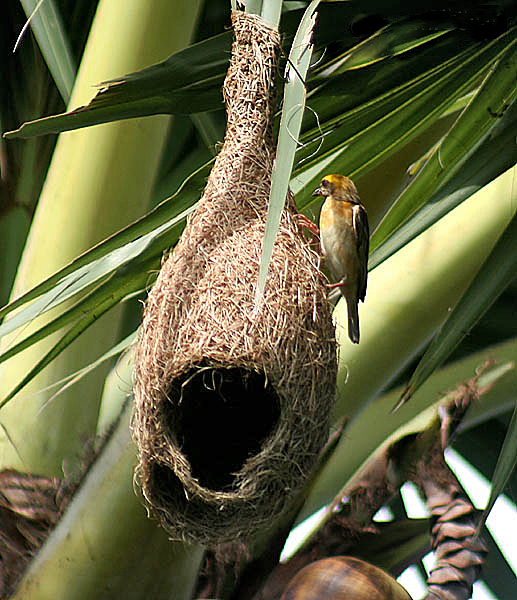
Male P. p. burmanicus at half-built nest in "helmet stage" without the entrance funnel

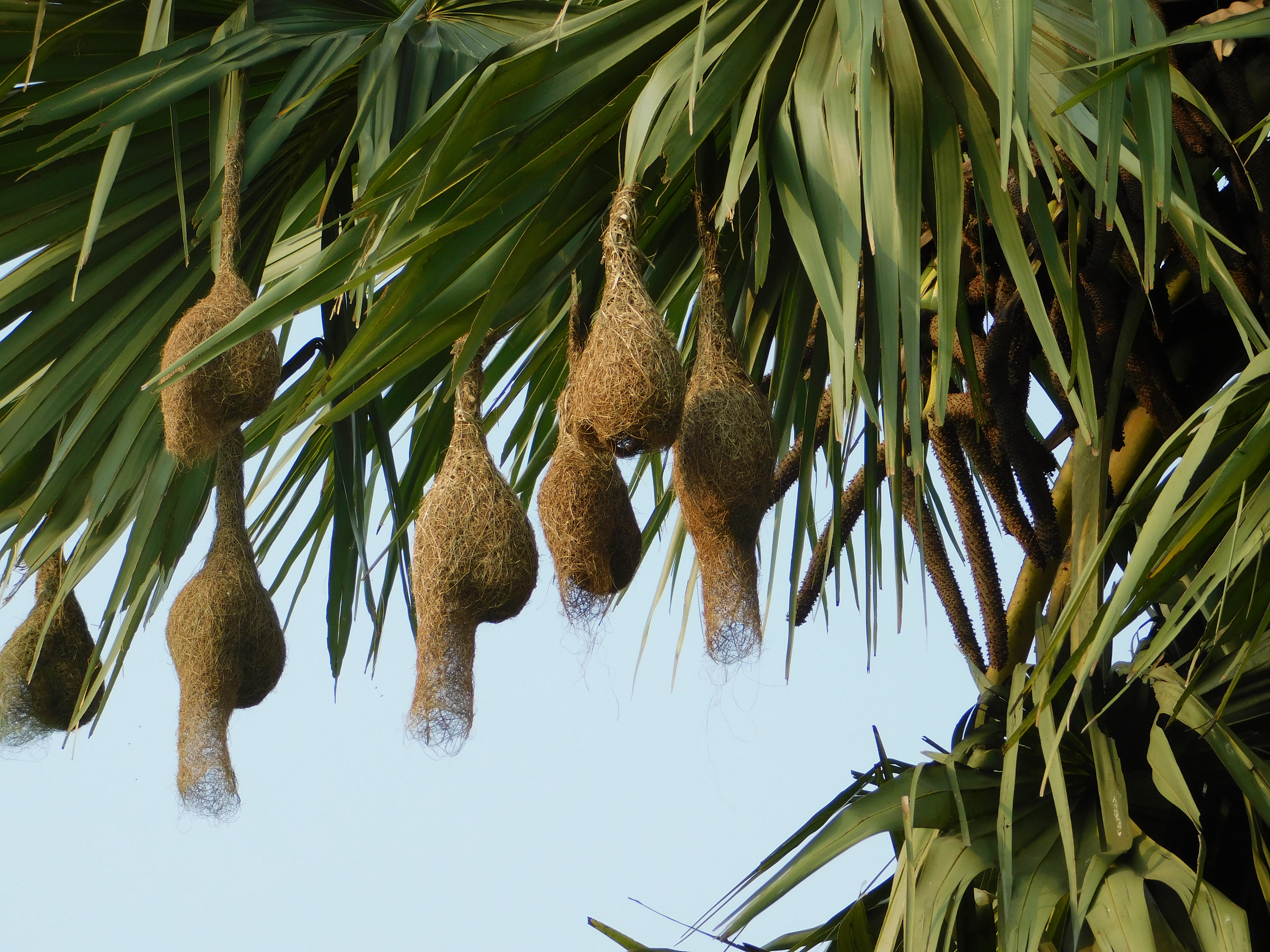
Nests hanging on Palmyra Palm

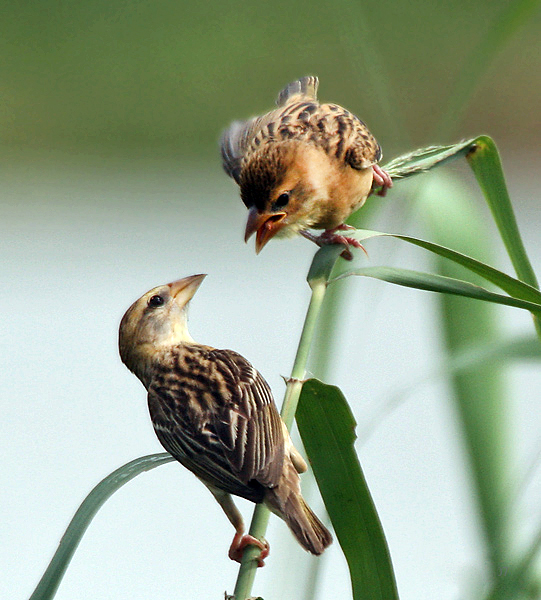
Female P. p. burmanicus feeding juvenile

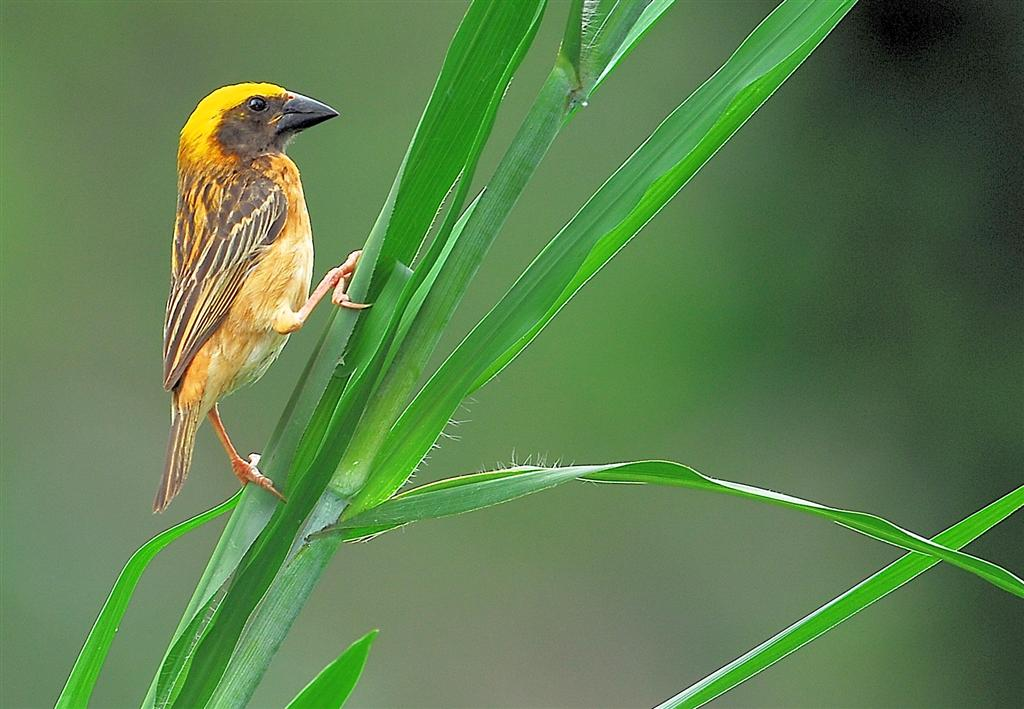
Male P. p. burmanicus showing bright yellow crown

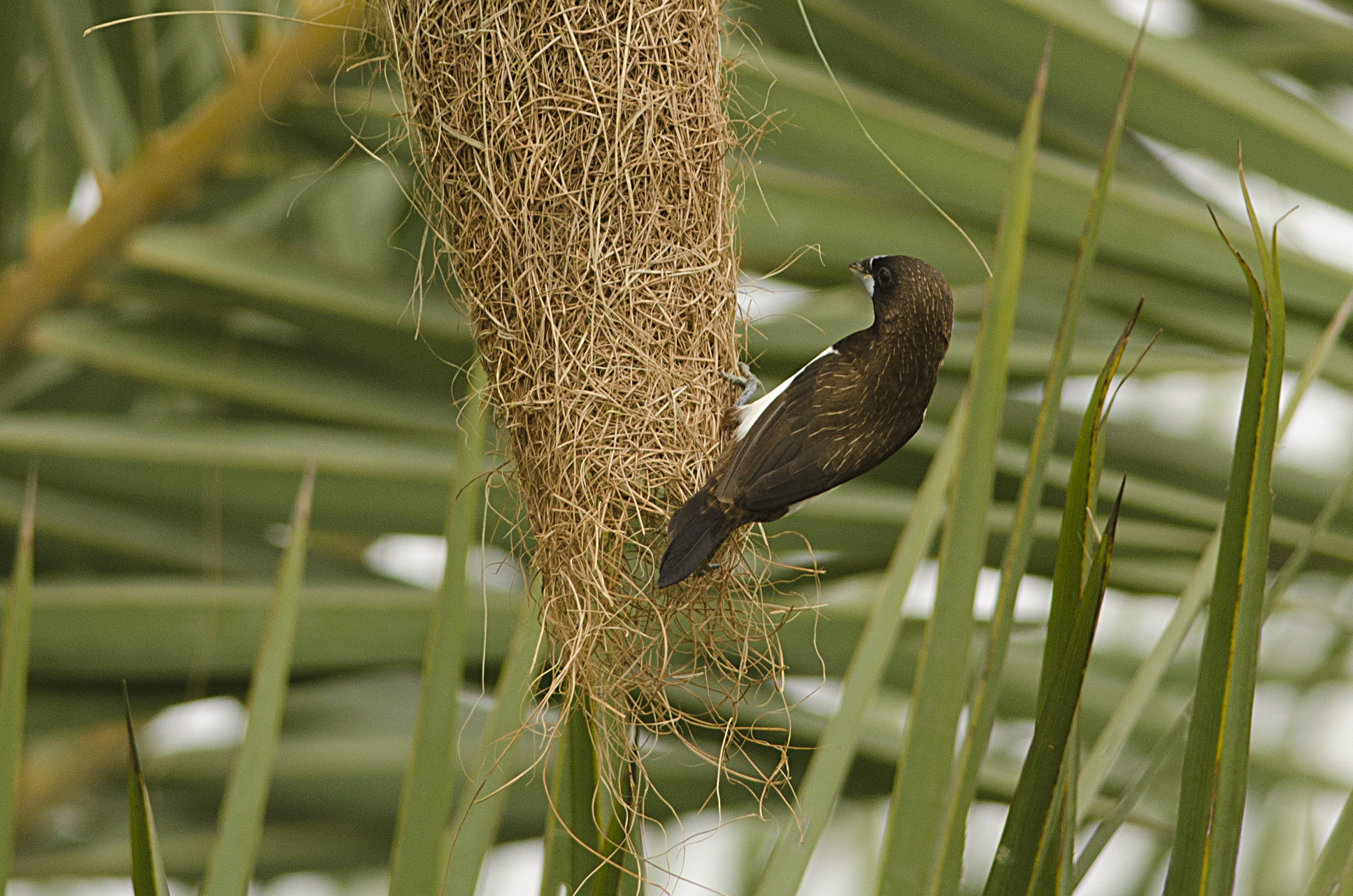
White-rumped munia using an abandoned nest

== Other sources ==
- Alexander, Horace (1972). "Nest building of the Baya Weaver Bird". Newsletter for Birdwatchers. 12(9):12.
- Ali, Salim; Ambedkar, Vijaykumar C. (1956). "Notes on the Baya Weaver Bird, Ploceus philippinus Linn". J. Bombay Nat. Hist. Soc. 53 (3): 381–389.
- Ambedkar, V.C. (1978). "Abnormal nests of the Baya Weaver Bird Ploceus philippinus (Linn.)". J. Bombay Nat. Hist. Soc. 75 (Supplement): 1205–1211.
- Ambedkar, V. C. (1958). "Notes on the Baya: Breeding season 1957". J. Bombay Nat. Hist. Soc. 55 (1): 100–106.
- Anon. (1981). "Multiple Baya nests". Newsletter for Birdwatchers . 21(1):2–4.
- Davis, T. A. (1985). "'Blind' or 'closed' nests of Baya Weaverbird". J. Bombay Nat. Hist. Soc. 82 (3): 658–660.
- Davis, T. A. (1966). "Nesting Behaviour of the Baya (Ploceus philippinus, L.)". (Technical Report No. Nat 4/66.) Research and Training School, Indian Statistical Institute, Calcutta. 28 pages.
- Dewar, Douglas (1909). "The nesting habits of the Baya". J. Bombay Nat. Hist. Soc. 19 (3): 627–634.
- Khacher, Lavkumar (1977). "Note on the Baya Weaver bird Ploceus philippinus (Linn.)". J. Bombay Nat. Hist. Soc. 74 (3): 533.
- Mathew, DN (1971). Ecology and biology of the Baya Weaver Bird Ploceus philippinus. Ph.D. dissertation. Bombay: University of Bombay.
- Mohan, D. (1991). "Common Baya Weaver Bird—Nest Building Habits". Newsletter for Birdwatchers . 31(9-10):2–4.
- Punde, A.B. (1912). "Migration of the Baya (Ploceus baya)". J. Bombay Nat. Hist. Soc. 21 (2): 675–676.
- Serrao, J.S. (1971). "Nesting of the Baya Weaver Bird Ploceus philippinus". Newsletter for Birdwatchers . 11(10):11.
- Sharma, S.K. (1995). "Nests of Baya used as filling fibre in southern Rajasthan". Newsletter for Birdwatchers . 35(3):57–58.
- Sharma, Satish Kumar (1987). "Host plants used by Baya Weaver Bird (Ploceus philippinus Linn.) for nesting in eastern Rajasthan (Breeding period 1982)". J. Bombay Nat. Hist. Soc. 84 (1): 218–220.
- Sharma, Satish Kumar (1988). "Buttressed nests of Baya Weaver Bird Ploceus philippinus (Linn.)". J. Bombay Nat. Hist. Soc. 85 (2): 432.
- Sharma, Satish Kumar (1985). "A study of qualitative aspect of abnormal nesting in Baya Weaver Bird the Ploceus philippinus and P. benghalensis". J. Southern Forest Ranger's College 61:50–54.
- Sharma, Satish Kumar (1991). "Nests of Baya Weaver Birds Ploceus philippinus and wintering Arthropods". J. Bombay Nat. Hist. Soc. 88 (2): 289–290.
- Sharma, Satish Kumar (1995). "A study of abnormal nests of Baya Weaver Bird Ploceus philippinus (Linn.) in Rajasthan". J. Bombay Nat. Hist. Soc. 92 (1): 67–76.
- Sidhartha, D. (1981). "Baya nests in October". Newsletter for Birdwatchers. 21(1):8.
- Singh, T. G. M. (1980). "An observation on the behaviour of Indian Baya (Ploceus phillipinus) in captivity during solar eclipses". Mayura 1(2):20–21.
- Stairmand, D.A. (1971). "Pre-monsoon breeding of the Baya Ploceus philippinus". Newsletter for Birdwatchers . 11(9):12.
- Thapliyal, J. P.; Tewary, P. D. (1964). "Effect of light on the pituitary, gonad and plumage pigmentation in the Avadavat (Estrilda amandava) and Baya Weaver (Ploceus philippinus)". Proc. Zool. Soc. London 142, 67–71.
- Vardhani, B. P.; Rao, P. S.; Srimannarayana, G. (1992). "The efficacy of certain plant extracts as repellents against House Sparrow, Passer domesticus and Baya Weaver Bird Ploceus philippinus". J. Appl. Zool. Res. 3(2):193–194.
