= K. K. Neelakantan =

Indian ornithologists

Induchoodan
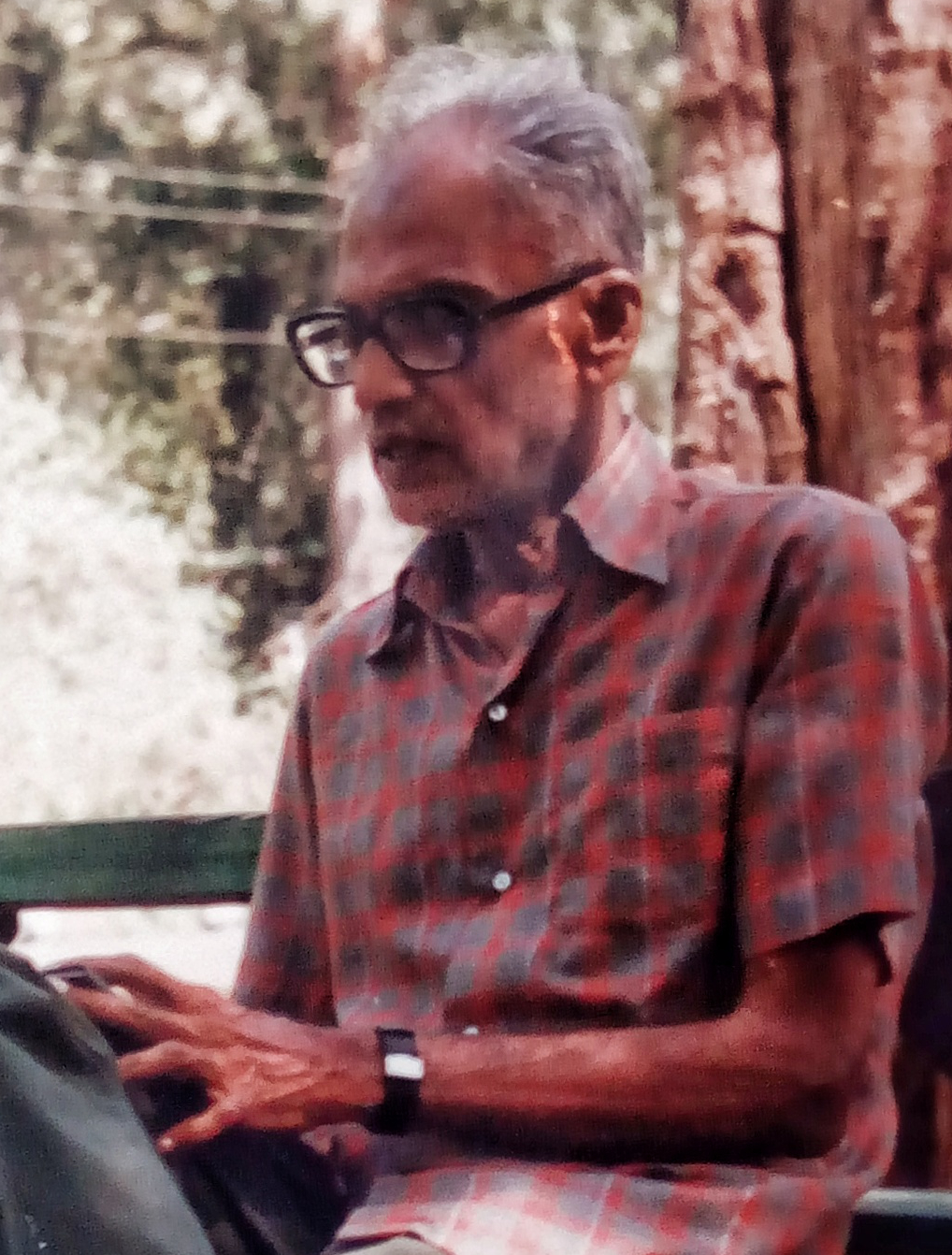
- Neelakantan in Thekkady, 1987
- Born: Kavassery Kailasam Neelakantan; 15 April 1923; Monkombu, Alleppy District, Kerala, British Raj
- Died: 14 June 1992 (aged 69); Kavassery, Kerala, India
- Occupations: Professor of English, Amateur Ornithologist
- Website: https://www.induchoodan.in

Kavassery Kailasam Neelakantan (15 April 1923 – 14 June 1992) better known by his pen name Induchoodan, was a leading Indian ornithologist. He is widely regarded as a pioneer of the environmental movement in Kerala for popularizing bird study through his books written in Malayalam.

== Early life ==
Neelakantan was born in 1923 in his mother's home at Mongombu, a village in Alleppy district. His father Kailasam Ayyer belonged to Kavassery near Alathur, Palghat District. As his father was a veterinary surgeon in the Mysore Government Service, his early schooling was in Karnataka. The rest of his schooling was done in ASMMHSS Alathur & Devakotai in Tamil Nadu. He studied for Intermediate in the Malabar Christian College, Kozhikode and for the B.A. (Hons) in English literature in the Madras Christian College (1941–44).

== Career ==
He started his career in early 1944 as a tutor in The American College in Madurai. From here he was transferred to the Loyola College Madras, then to Rajamundry and again to Victoria College, Palakkad where he continued till 1957. After that he served the Government College, Chittoor, The Government College for Women, Thiruvananthapuram, the Maharaja’s College, Ernakulam and University College Thiruvananthapuram. During his term as the Head of the Department of English in the Thiruvananthapuram University College, he retired in 1978.

== Works ==
His magnum opus Keralathile Pakshikal (Birds of Kerala) first published in 1958 is considered to be a classic in Malayalam. Described with illustrations of 261 birds found in Kerala, it is considered a unique work among Indian languages. A collection of his essays on environment, bird watching and birds titled Pullu Thottu Poonara Vare won the award of the State Department of Science, Technology and environment for popular Science writing and also the I. C. Chacko Endowment prize by the Kerala Sahitya Academy. Pakshikalum Manushyarum, his other work on birds and bird watching for children, also has won two awards from the Kerala Government and Kairali Children's Book Trust instituted for Children's literature.

When the editor for Macmillan Publishers approached him for a book on any subject of his own choice in English, he offered instead to write a book on birds and bird watching for children in Malayalam. He started bird watching at a young age when he was living in his ancestral house at Kavassery. He practiced this hobby very seriously at all places wherever he had been working.

In 1949, Induchoodan got the rare good fortune of stumbling upon the largest pelicanry in India. He found it at Aredu some 13 miles from Tadepalligudam in the East Godavari District. This finding was published in 1949. Induchoodan was the president of Prakriti Samrakshna Samithi and led the Silent Valley Agitation during the year 1979. He was the founder and President of Kerala Natural History Society and Honorary member of WWF India. He pursued the study of birds until his death at the age of 69.

The biography titled ‘Pakshikalum Oru Manushyanum’ (Birds and a Man) was authored by Suresh Elamon and published by Mathrubhumi Books in April 2024.

=== List of publications ===
- Neelakantan, K. K. (1982): The Pintail (Anas acuta Linn.) - an addition to the birds occurring in Kerala. J. Bombay Nat. Hist. Soc. 79(3), 667–668.
- Neelakantan, K. K. (1986): Pond heron afloat. Newsletter for Birdwatchers. 26(5-6), 11–13.
- Neelakantan, K. K. (1980): The breeding of the Indian Koel Eudynamys scolopacea. Newsletter for Birdwatchers. 20(1), 7.
- Neelakantan, K. K. (1980): A pelican's pathetic plight. Tigerpaper 7(2), 21–24.
- Neelakantan, K. K. (1983): The Black Ibis in South India. Newsletter for Birdwatchers. 23(7-8), 17.
- Neelakantan, K. K. (1981): The Brownwinged Tern (Sterna anaethetus): an addition to the birds of Kerala. J. Bombay Nat. Hist. Soc. 78(1), 167–168.
- Neelakantan, K. K. (1973): The Indian Lorikeet (Loriculus vernalis): Its courtship and mating. J. Bombay Nat. Hist. Soc. 70(3), 554–556.
- Neelakantan, K. K. (1975): The Indian Moorhen (Gallinula chloropus) breeding in Kerala. J. Bombay Nat. Hist. Soc. 72(2), 537–538.
- Neelakantan, K. K. (1975): A day at a nest of the Great Black Woodpecker (Dryocopus javensis). J. Bombay Nat. Hist. Soc. 72(2), 544–548.
- Neelakantan, K. K. (1975): Curious behaviour of a Loten's Sunbird (Nectarinia lotenia). J. Bombay Nat. Hist. Soc. 72(3), 858–859.
- Neelakantan, K. K. (1976): On a nesting pair of Tailor Birds (Orthotomus sutorius). J. Bombay Nat. Hist. Soc. 73(1), 219–221.
- Neelakantan, K. K. (1976): On some nests of the Tailor Bird (Orthotomus sutorius). J. Bombay Nat. Hist. Soc. 73(2), 396–400.
- Neelakantan, K. K. (1979): The voice of the juvenile Brown Hawk-Owl [Ninox scutulata (Raffles)]. J. Bombay Nat. Hist. Soc. 76(2), 363–364.
- Neelakantan, K. K. (1986): Cuckoo. In: Encyclopedia of Indian Natural History. (Ed: Hawkins, RE) Bombay Natural History Society & Oxford University Press, Delhi, 158.
- Neelakantan, K. K. (1986): Extinct and vanishing birds. In: Encyclopedia of Indian Natural History. (Ed: Hawkins, RE) Bombay Natural History Society & Oxford University Press, Delhi, 205–206.
- Neelakantan, K. K. (1986): Owl. In: Encyclopedia of Indian Natural History. (Ed: Hawkins, RE) Bombay Natural History Society & Oxford University Press, Delhi, 425.
- Neelakantan, K. K. (1971): Calls of the Malabar Jungle Owlet (Glaucidium radiatum malabaricum). J. Bombay Nat. Hist. Soc. 68(3), 830–832.
- Neelakantan, K. K. (1972): On the Southern Racket-tailed Drongo Dicrurus paradiseus paradiseus (Linn.). J. Bombay Nat. Hist. Soc. 69(1), 1–9.
- Neelakantan, K. K. (1953): Common Grey Hornbill (Tockus birostris) eating fruits of the Yellow Oleander (Thevetia neriifolia). J. Bombay Nat. Hist. Soc. 51(3), 738.
- Neelakantan, K. K. (1953): Juvenile Brahminy Kites (Haliastur indus) learning things the modern way. J. Bombay Nat. Hist. Soc. 51(3), 739.
- Neelakantan, K. K. (1953): Strange habit of Terns breeding on Godavari sand-flats. J. Bombay Nat. Hist. Soc. 51(3), 740–741.
- Neelakantan, K. K. (1953): Occurrence of the Pheasant-tailed Jacana (Hydrophasianus chirurgus) in Madras State. J. Bombay Nat. Hist. Soc. 51(3), 741–742.
- Neelakantan, K. K. (1953): Observations on the nesting habits of some common birds. J. Bombay Nat. Hist. Soc. 51(3), 743–745.
- Neelakantan, K. K. (1954): The secondary song of birds. J. Bombay Nat. Hist. Soc. 52(2&3), 615–620.
- Neelakantan, K. K. (1956): Some observations on the breeding behaviour of the Chestnut Bittern Ixobrychus cinnamomeus (Gmelin) and the Black Bittern Dupetor flavicollis (Latham). J. Bombay Nat. Hist. Soc. 53(4), 704–708.
- Neelakantan, K. K. (1957): Hypnotic behaviour of a Whiteheaded Babbler (Turdoides striatus). J. Bombay Nat. Hist. Soc. 54(2), 460–461.
- Neelakantan, K. K. (1958): Water birds and our irrigation schemes. J. Bombay Nat. Hist. Soc. 55(2), 360–361.
- Neelakantan, K. K. (1958): The Blackbacked Woodpecker, Chrysocolaptes festivus (Boddaert), in Chittur Kerala. J. Bombay Nat. Hist. Soc. 55(3), 559.
- Neelakantan, K. K. (1958): The voice of the Kora, Gallicrex cinerea (Gmelin). J. Bombay Nat. Hist. Soc. 55(3), 560–561.
- Neelakantan, K. K. (1960): On the occurrence of the Redheaded Merlin (Falco chiquera) in Kerala. J. Bombay Nat. Hist. Soc. 57(2), 409–411.
- Neelakantan, K. K. (1962): Drumming by, and an instance of homo-sexual behaviour in, the Lesser Goldenbacked Woodpecker (Dinopium benghalense). J. Bombay Nat. Hist. Soc. 59(1), 288–290.
- Neelakantan, K. K. (1948): On the breeding of the Bluetailed Bee Eater (Merops superciliosus javanicus) in Rajahmundri, East Godavari District. J. Bombay Nat. Hist. Soc. 47(4), 741–742.
- Neelakantan, K. K. (1990): Breeding of the River Tern Sterna aurantia in Kerala. J. Bombay Nat. Hist. Soc. 87(1), 144–145.
- Neelakantan, K. K. (1964): Roosting of the Grey Wagtail [Motacilla caspica (Gmelin)] in the Thekkady Wild Life Sanctuary. J. Bombay Nat. Hist. Soc. 61(3), 691–692.
- Neelakantan, K. K. (1970): The occurrence of the Sanderling (Calidris albus) in Kerala. J. Bombay Nat. Hist. Soc. 67(3), 570.
- Neelakantan, K. K. (1969): Occurrence of the Terek Sandpiper, Tringa terek (Latham) in Kerala. J. Bombay Nat. Hist. Soc. 66(3), 623.
- Neelakantan, K. K. (1992): Puzzling plumages of the Little Ringed Plover. Newsletter for Birdwatchers. 32(1-2), 13–14.
- Neelakantan, K. K. (1990): Yellow-eyed Babbler Chrysomma sinensis in Kerala. J. Bombay Nat. Hist. Soc. 87(2), 302.
- Neelakantan, K. K.; Elamons (1988): Ambalamedu : a duck sanctuary. Sanctuary Asia 8(3), 42–47.
- Neelakantan, K. K. (1984): A note on the birds of Kerala. Newsletter for Birdwatchers. 24(1-2), 5–7.
- Neelakantan, K. K. (1984): A plea for some birds of Kerala. Newsletter for Birdwatchers. 24(3-4), 5–8.
- Neelakantan, K. K. (1984): A plea for some birds of Kerala. Newsletter for Birdwatchers. 24(7-8), 2–4.
- Neelakantan, K. K.; Elamons (1984): Teals or tourism. Hornbill 1984(3), 20–22.
- Neelakantan, K. K.; Sreenivasan, KV; Sureshkumar, VK (1980): The Crab Plover (Dromas ardeola) in Kerala. J. Bombay Nat. Hist. Soc. 77(3), 508.
- Neelakantan, K. K. (1952): More stray bird notes from Malabar. J. Bombay Nat. Hist. Soc. 50(3), 664–667.
- Neelakantan, K. K. (1949): A South Indian pelicanry. J. Bombay Nat. Hist. Soc. 48(4), 656–666.
- Neelakantan, K. K. (1950): Stray bird notes from Malabar. J. Bombay Nat. Hist. Soc. 49(3), 553–555.
- Neelakantan, K. K. (1990): On the voice of the Kora or Watercock Gallicrex cinerea. J. Bombay Nat. Hist. Soc. 87(2), 292–293.
- Neelakantan, K. K. (1992): The diary of a naturalist. Blackbuck. 8(4), 102–108.
- Neelakantan, P; Neelakantan, K. K. (1989): On the roosting of a pair of Tailor Birds. Newsletter for Birdwatchers. 29(9-10), 2–3.
- Neelakantan, K. K. (1991): Bluebreasted Banded Rail Rallus striatus Linn. nesting in Kerala. J. Bombay Nat. Hist. Soc. 88(3), 448–450.
- Neelakantan, K. K. (1991): Breeding of the Kora or Watercock Gallicrex cinerea in Kerala. J. Bombay Nat. Hist. Soc. 88(3), 450–451.
- Neelakantan, K. K. (1977): The sacred birds of Thirukkalukundram. Newsletter for Birdwatchers. 17(4), 6.
- Neelakantan, K. K. (1976): Communal roosting in the Redwhiskered Bulbul. Newsletter for Birdwatchers. 16(2), 4–5.
- Neelakantan, K. K. (1976): Seasonal variations in the occurrence of non-migratory birds. Newsletter for Birdwatchers. 16(2), 5–6.
- Neelakantan, K. K. (1976): Where do Darters sleep? Newsletter for Birdwatchers. 16(6), 9.
- Neelakantan, K. K. (1976): An interesting double-nest. Newsletter for Birdwatchers. 16(8), 9-10.
- Neelakantan, K. K. (1973): A trip to Ponmudi - a tale of disappointments and delights. Newsletter for Birdwatchers. 13(3), 1–3.
- Neelakantan, K. K. (1972): A note on the behaviour of two House Crows. Newsletter for Birdwatchers. 12(1), 11–12.
- Neelakantan, K. K. (1972): A castaway with birds. Newsletter for Birdwatchers. 12(4), 7–9.
- Neelakantan, K. K. (1993): The Crested Honey Buzzard Pernis ptilorhyncus (Temminck) breeding in Kerala. J. Bombay Nat. Hist. Soc. 90(2), 286–288.
- Neelakantan, K. K. (1971): The pelicanry at Kolamuru. Newsletter for Birdwatchers. 11(4), 1–3.
- Neelakantan, K. K. (1971): In memoriam Kolleru pelicanry? Newsletter for Birdwatchers. 11(8), 7–8.
- Neelakantan, K. K. (1964): The roosting habits of the barbet. Newsletter for Birdwatchers. 4(3), 1–2.
- Neelakantan, K. K. (1966): Bird quarrels. Newsletter for Birdwatchers. 6(5), 5–6.
- Neelakantan, K. K. (1969): Close association between the Grey Wagtail and the Forest Wagtail. Newsletter for Birdwatchers. 9(7), 10–11.
- Neelakantan, K. K. (1969): Pheasant-tailed Jacana in Kerala. Newsletter for Birdwatchers. 9(11), 8.
- Neelakantan, K. K. (1969): The Baybanded Cuckoo in North Kerala. Newsletter for Birdwatchers. 9(12), 3.
- Neelakantan, K. K. (1963): Where to go to watch birds. Newsletter for Birdwatchers. 3(9), 4–5.
- Neelakantan, K. K. (1963): Tickell's flowerpecker and red tree-ant. Newsletter for Birdwatchers. 3(12), 2.
- Neelakantan, K. K. (1965): The nesting of the Heartspotted Woodpecker. Newsletter for Birdwatchers. 5(3), 6–8.
- Neelakantan, K. K. (1965): The slaughter of Imperial Pigeons in Cherai, Kerala. Newsletter for Birdwatchers. 5(6), 7–8.
- Neelakantan, K. K. (1965): 'Little Egret Egretta garzetta breeding in Kerala.'. Newsletter for Birdwatchers. 5(6), 8.
- Neelakantan, K. K. (1965): More about the birds of Thekkady. Newsletter for Birdwatchers. 5(7), 1–4.
- Neelakantan, K. K. (1965): Breeding of the Little Egret in Kerala. Newsletter for Birdwatchers. 5(9), 9.
- Neelakantan, K. K. (1966): Strange choice of roost by Crows. Newsletter for Birdwatchers. 6(1), 1–2.
- Neelakantan, K. K. (1966): Behaviour of a captive Great Hornbill. Newsletter for Birdwatchers. 6(2), 8.
- Neelakantan, K. K. (1967): Reflections on a report of arson by the Common Crow. Newsletter for Birdwatchers. 7(5), 3–4.
- Neelakantan, K. K. (1967): More about Moondaidappu. Newsletter for Birdwatchers. 7(7), 7–8.
- Neelakantan, K. K. (1968): A note on the behaviour of two House Crows. Newsletter for Birdwatchers. 8(9), 2–3.
- Neelakantan, K. K. (1954): Some observations on the breeding behaviour of the Chestnut Bittern Ixobrychus cinnamomeus (Gmelin) and the Black Bittern Dupetor flavicollis (Latham). J. Bombay Nat. Hist. Soc. 53(4), 704–708.
- Neelakantan, K. K. (1978): Biology is for birds. Newsletter for Birdwatchers. 18(7), 9-10.
- Neelakantan, K. K. (1975): The Purplerumped Sunbird. Newsletter for Birdwatchers. 15(1), 8.
- Mohankumar, C; Nair, SSC; Neelakantan, K. K. (1975): Nesting of the Little Egret: a new record for Kerala. Newsletter for Birdwatchers. 15(7), 5–6.
- Neelakantan, K. K. (1970): Woodpeckers: Friends or foes? Newsletter for Birdwatchers. 10(8), 1–3.
- Neelakantan, K. K. (1993): The pathetic plight of the Grey (Spotbilled) Pelican. Blackbuck. 9(3&4), 72–80.
- Neelakantan, K. K. (1980): A project for the eighties: Saving the Spottedbilled Pelican. Hornbill 1980(1), 21–24.
- Neelakantan, K. K. (1969): Motiveless malignity or purposeless pestering. Newsletter for Birdwatchers. 9(6), 4.
- Neelakantan, K. K. (1969): The mating of the Goldenback Woodpecker Dinopium benghalense. Newsletter for Birdwatchers. 9(6), 6.
- Neelakantan, K. K. (1962): Woodpeckers nesting in old nest-tunnels. Newsletter for Birdwatchers. 2(6), 8–9.
- Neelakantan, K. K. (1962): Birds of Cochin and Ernakulam. Newsletter for Birdwatchers. 2(6), 10.
- Neelakantan, K. K. (1986): The Pond Heron keeps pace with progress. Blackbuck. 2(2), 31–32.
- Neelakantan, K. K. (1974): Jungle Mynas Acridotheres fuscus anting. Newsletter for Birdwatchers. 14(5), 8–9.
- Neelakantan, K. K. (1962): The food of the Magpie Robin. Newsletter for Birdwatchers. 2(9), 8–9.
- Neelakantan, K. K. (1973): On a roost of the Whiteheaded (Blyth's) Myna Sturnus malabaricus blythii. Newsletter for Birdwatchers. 13(9), 4–7.
- Neelakantan, K. K. (1976): The Malabar Grey Hornbill Tockus griseus. Newsletter for Birdwatchers. 16(3), 4–6.
- Neelakantan, K. K. (1964): The Green Barbet Megalaima viridis. Newsletter for Birdwatchers. 4(4), 6–7.
- Neelakantan, K. K. (1964): More about the Green Barbet Megalaima viridis. Newsletter for Birdwatchers. 4(9), 5–7.
- Neelakantan, K. K. (1969): Nesting of the Wiretailed Swallow Hirundo smithii in Kerala. Newsletter for Birdwatchers. 9(8), 6.
- Neelakantan, K. K. (1965): Young Forest Eagle-Owl in captivity. Peacock 2(4), 18–19.
- Neelakantan, K. K. (1965): Rare encounters. Peacock 2(6), 61–63.
- Neelakantan, K. K. (1979): Pakshikalum manushyrum: Pakshinirikshanathinu oru amukham [Birds and men: An introduction to bird-watching]. The MacMillan Company of India Limited, Trivandrum. 80 pages.
- Neelakantan, K. K. (1983): Comment. Mayura 4(3), 25.
- Neelakantan, K. K. (1962): Plumage problems. Newsletter for Birdwatchers. 2(3), 8–9.
- Neelakantan, K. K. (1962): Correspondence. Newsletter for Birdwatchers. 2(3), 12–13.
- Neelakantan, K. K. (1962): Courtship and mating of the Black Drongo. Newsletter for Birdwatchers. 2(4), 9.
- Neelakantan, K. K. (1962): Matins and vespers of 9 June 1957. Newsletter for Birdwatchers. 2(5), 9-10.
- Neelakantan, K. K.; Suresh Kumar, VK (1980): Occurrence of the Blackwinged Stilt (Himantopus himantopus) in Kerala. J. Bombay Nat. Hist. Soc. 77(3), 510.
- Neelakantan, K. K.; Sashikumar, C; Venugopalan, R (Eds.) (1993): A book of Kerala birds. Part 1. World Wide Fund for Nature-India. Kerala State Committee, Trivandrum. 143 pages.
