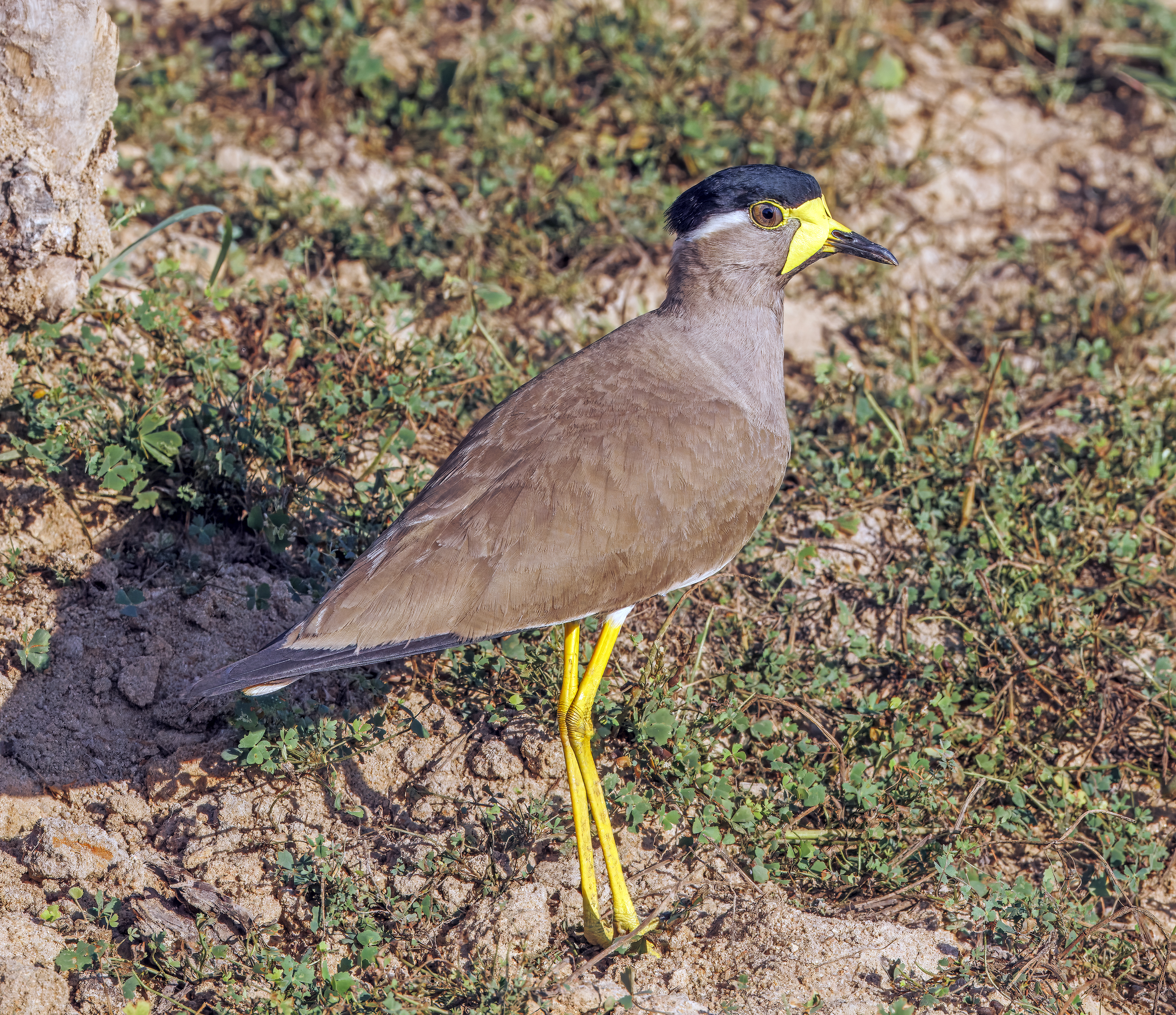
- in Yala National Park, Sri Lanka Calls

Conservation status
- Least Concern (IUCN 3.1)

Scientific classification
- Kingdom: Animalia
- Phylum: Chordata
- Class: Aves
- Order: Charadriiformes
- Family: Charadriidae
- Genus: Vanellus
- Species: V. malabaricus

Binomial name
- Vanellus malabaricus (Boddaert, 1783)

Synonyms
- Charadrius malabaricus Charadrius malabaricus (lapsus); Hoplopterus malabaricus Lobipluvia malabarica Lobipluria malabarica (lapsus); Sarciophorus malabaricus Vanellus malarbaricus Sarciophorus bilobus

= Yellow-wattled lapwing =

Species of bird

The yellow-wattled lapwing (Vanellus malabaricus) is a lapwing that is endemic to the Indian subcontinent. It is found mainly on the dry plains of peninsular India and has a sharp call and is capable of fast flight. Although they do not migrate, they are known to make seasonal movements in response to rains. They are dull grey brown with a black cap, yellow legs and a triangular wattle at the base of the beak. Like other lapwings and plovers, they are ground birds and their nest is a mere collection of tiny pebbles within which their well camouflaged eggs are laid. The chicks are nidifugous, leaving the nest shortly after hatching and following their parents to forage for food.

== Taxonomy ==
The yellow-wattled lapwing was described by the French polymath Georges-Louis Leclerc, Comte de Buffon in his Histoire Naturelle des Oiseaux in 1781. The bird was also illustrated in a hand-coloured plate engraved by François-Nicolas Martinet in the Planches Enluminées D'Histoire Naturelle. This plate was produced under the supervision of Edme-Louis Daubenton to accompany Buffon's text. Neither the plate caption nor Buffon's description included a scientific name but in 1783 the Dutch naturalist Pieter Boddaert coined the binomial name Charadrius malabaricus in his catalogue of the Planches Enluminées. The type locality is the Malabar Coast in southwest India. The current genus Vanellus was erected by the French zoologist Mathurin Jacques Brisson in 1760. Vanellus is Medieval Latin for a "lapwing". It is a diminutive of the Latin vanus meaning "winnowing" or "fan". The species is monotypic.

== Description ==
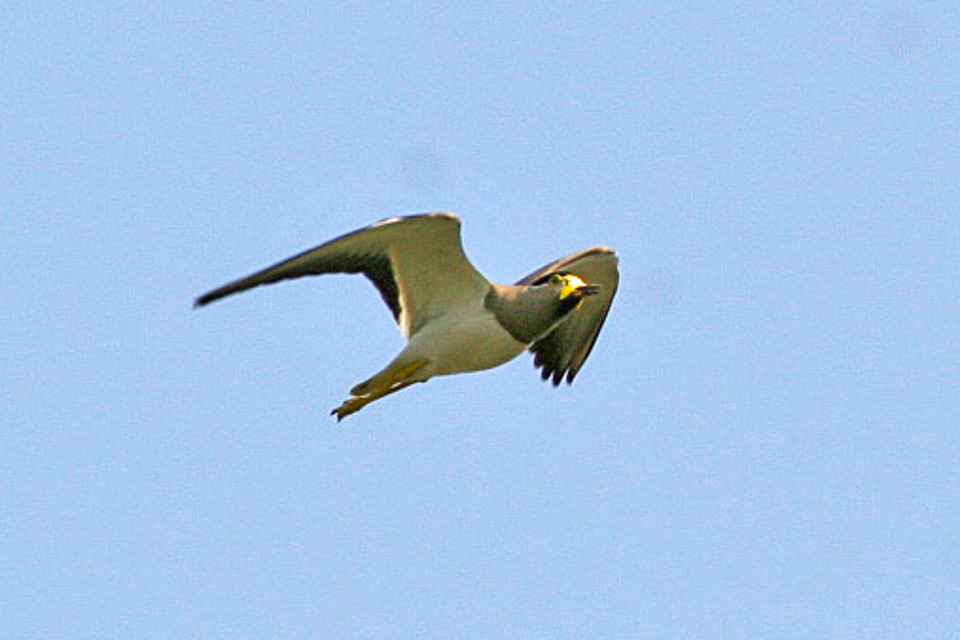
Yellow-wattled Lapwing in flight

These are conspicuous and unmistakable birds found in dry stony and open grassland or scrub habitats. They are medium-sized pale brown waders with a black crown which is separated from the brown on the neck by a narrow white band and large yellow facial wattles. The chin and throat are black and the brown neck and upper breast is separated from the white belly by a narrow blackish line. The tail has a subterminal black band which does not extend into the outer tail-feathers. There is a white wingbar on the inner half of the wing. The bill is yellow at the base. They have tiny yellow carpal spurs. The crown feathers can be raised slightly in displays. They are mostly sedentary but populations make long-distance movements in response to the monsoons. They are occasional visitors to the Kathmandu valley in Nepal and a vagrant was seen in Malaysia.

There are no recognized subspecies, but there is a size increase from south to north. They are 260-280mm long with a wing of 192-211mm, bill 23-26mm, tarsus 57-66mm and tail 71-84mm. Juveniles have a brown crown and the sexes are alike but males have slightly longer wings and tarsi. The call is a sharp tchee-it call.

Local names include zirdi in Hindi, chitawa in Telugu and jithiri in Rajasthan and Pakistan, pili tatihri in Punjabi, laori in Malvi and Nimadi, parasna titodi or vagdau titodi in Gujarati, pitmukhi titvi in Marathi, manjakanni in Malayalam, haladi tittibha in Kannada, aalkati in Tamil and kiraluwa in Sinhalese.

== Habitat and distribution ==
This species is common in much of India, being seen in a variety of open lowland habitats. It tends to be seen in drier habitats than the red-wattled lapwing, Vanellus indicus. They are found in most parts of India, parts of Pakistan, Nepal, Bangladesh and Sri Lanka. They make short-distance movements in response to rain but the exact pattern is not known.

== Behaviour and ecology ==
These lapwings breed in the dry season with peak breeding in March to May ahead of the monsoons. The nest territory has been estimated, based on the distance to nearest neighbours, to be about 2.7 acres. They lay four eggs in a ground scrape. A nest in a clump of grass has been noted as exceptional. Parents visit water and wet their breast feathers ("belly soaking"; they may stay for as much as 10 minutes to soak water) which may then be used to cool the eggs or chicks. The four eggs typically hatch simultaneously, even though they are laid with a difference of a few days. The nidifugous young are well camouflaged as they forage with the parents. Chicks squat flat on the ground and freeze when parents emit an alarm call. A second brood may be raised, particularly when the first fails and young from a previous brood have been seen along with parent birds incubating a second clutch. Simultaneous courtship displays among several pairs in close proximity has been noted. In one study more than 60% of the nests had 4 eggs-clutches with the rest having 3 eggs. Hatching success was found to be about 27.58% and egg loss was due to predation and nest damage. The incubation period was 27–30 days. When the nests are approached, the incubating bird attempts to move away from the nest without drawing attention to it.

The food of the yellow-wattled lapwing is beetles, termites and other invertebrates, which are picked from the ground. The feather mite Magimelia dolichosikya has been noted as an ectoparasite of this species.

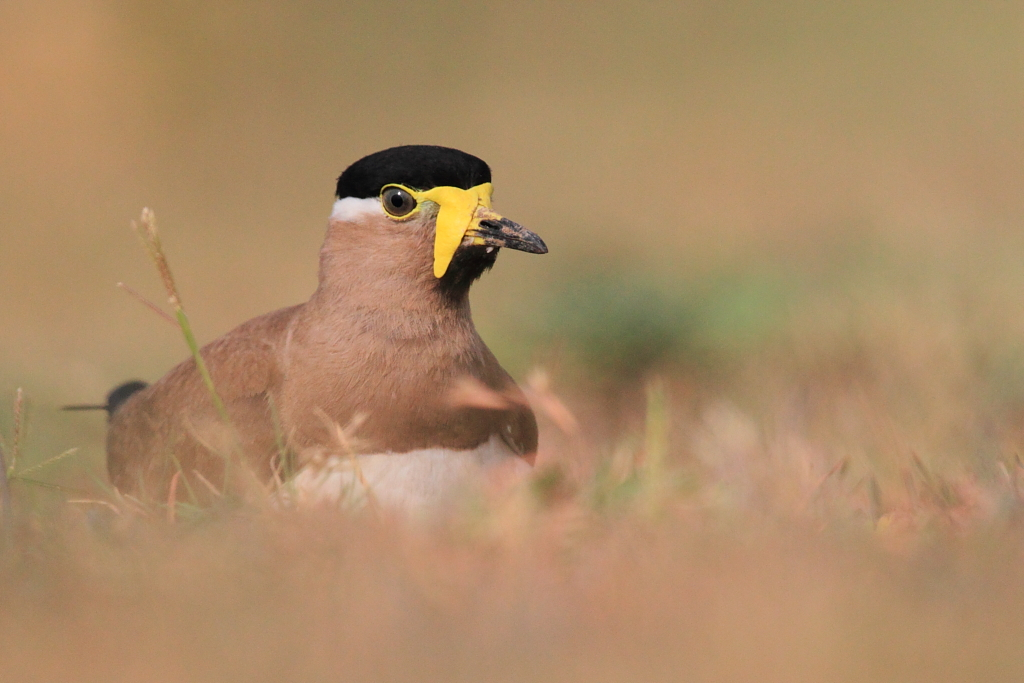
Sitting on the nest

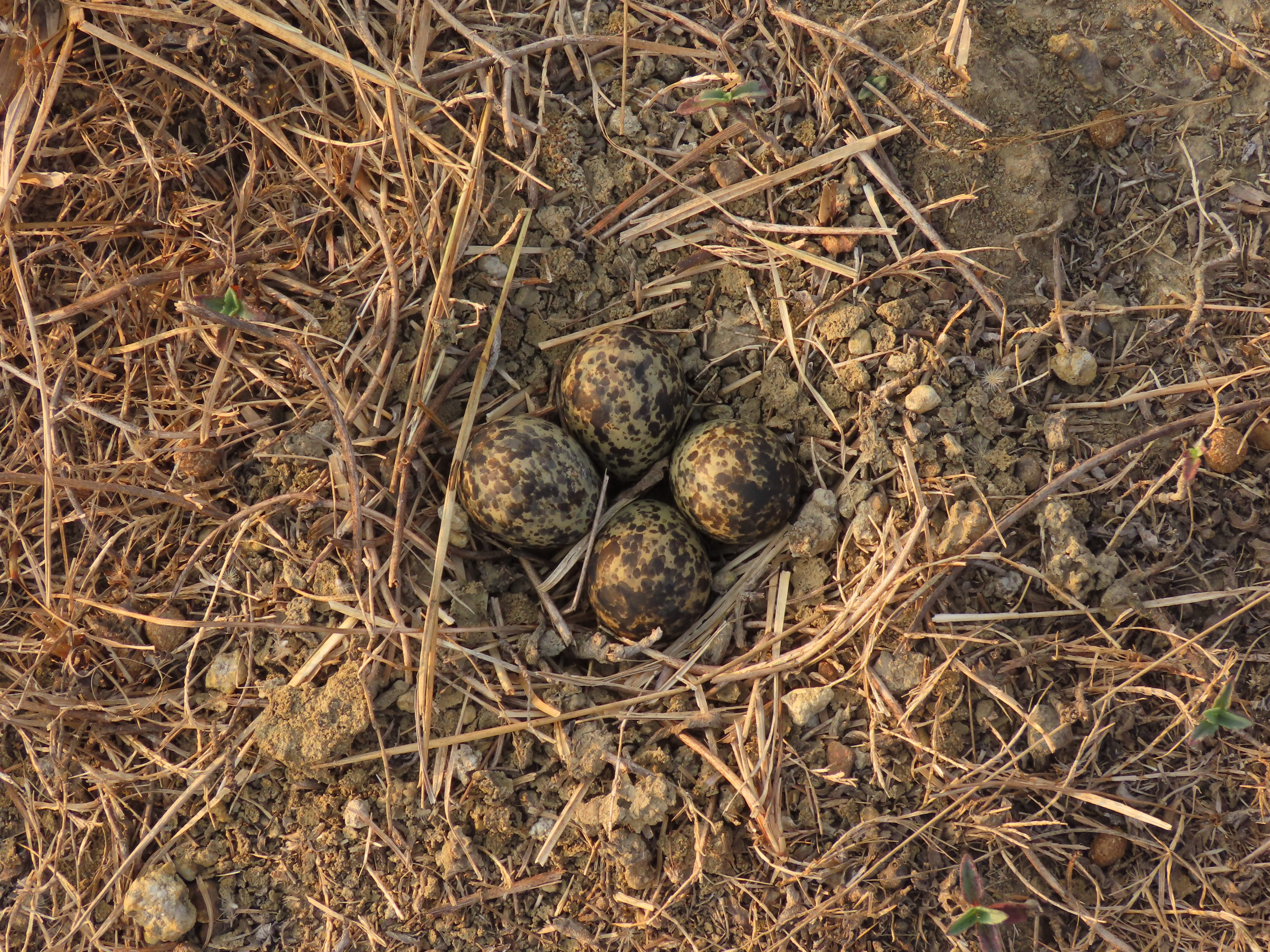
Egg clutch

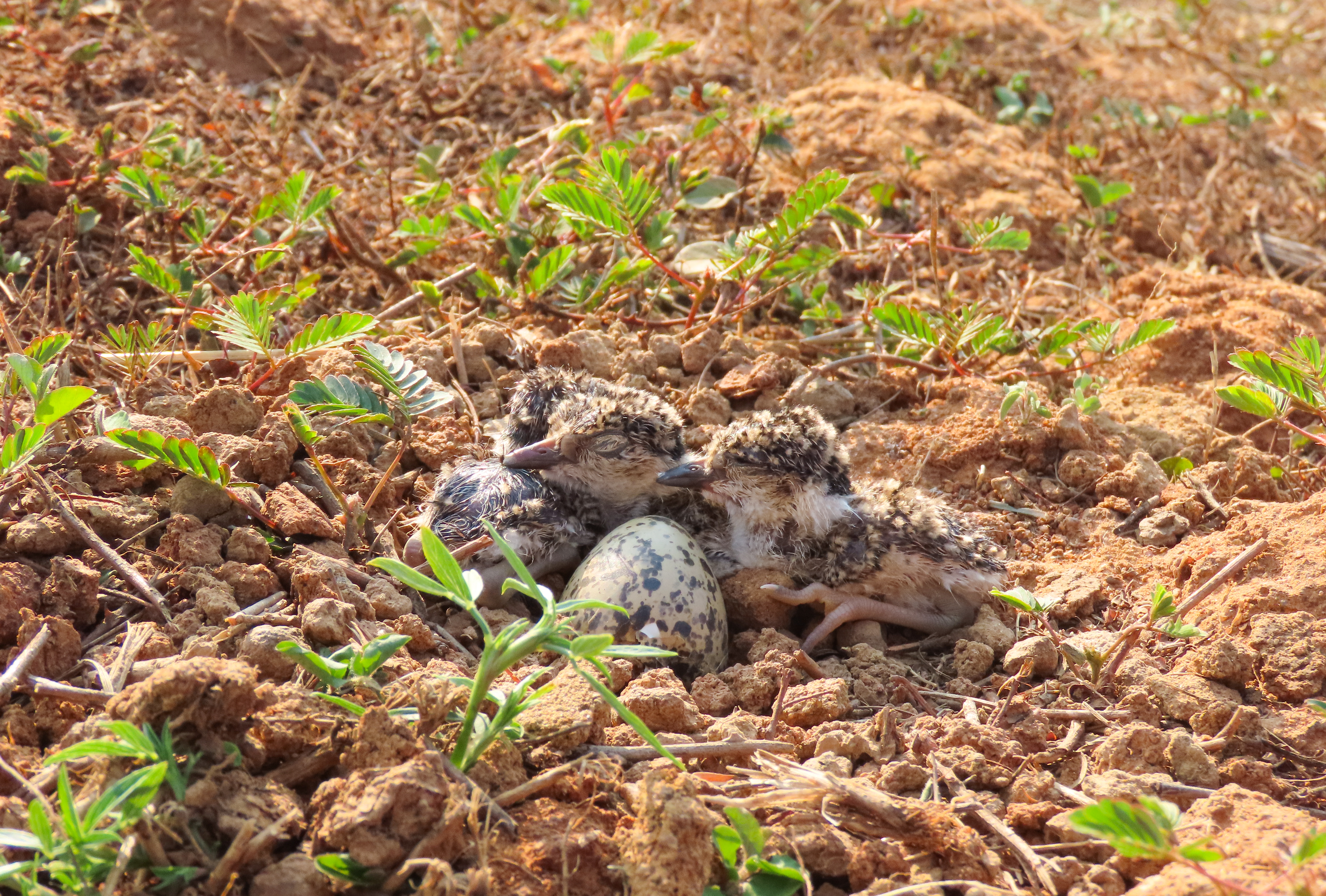
Newly hatched chicks

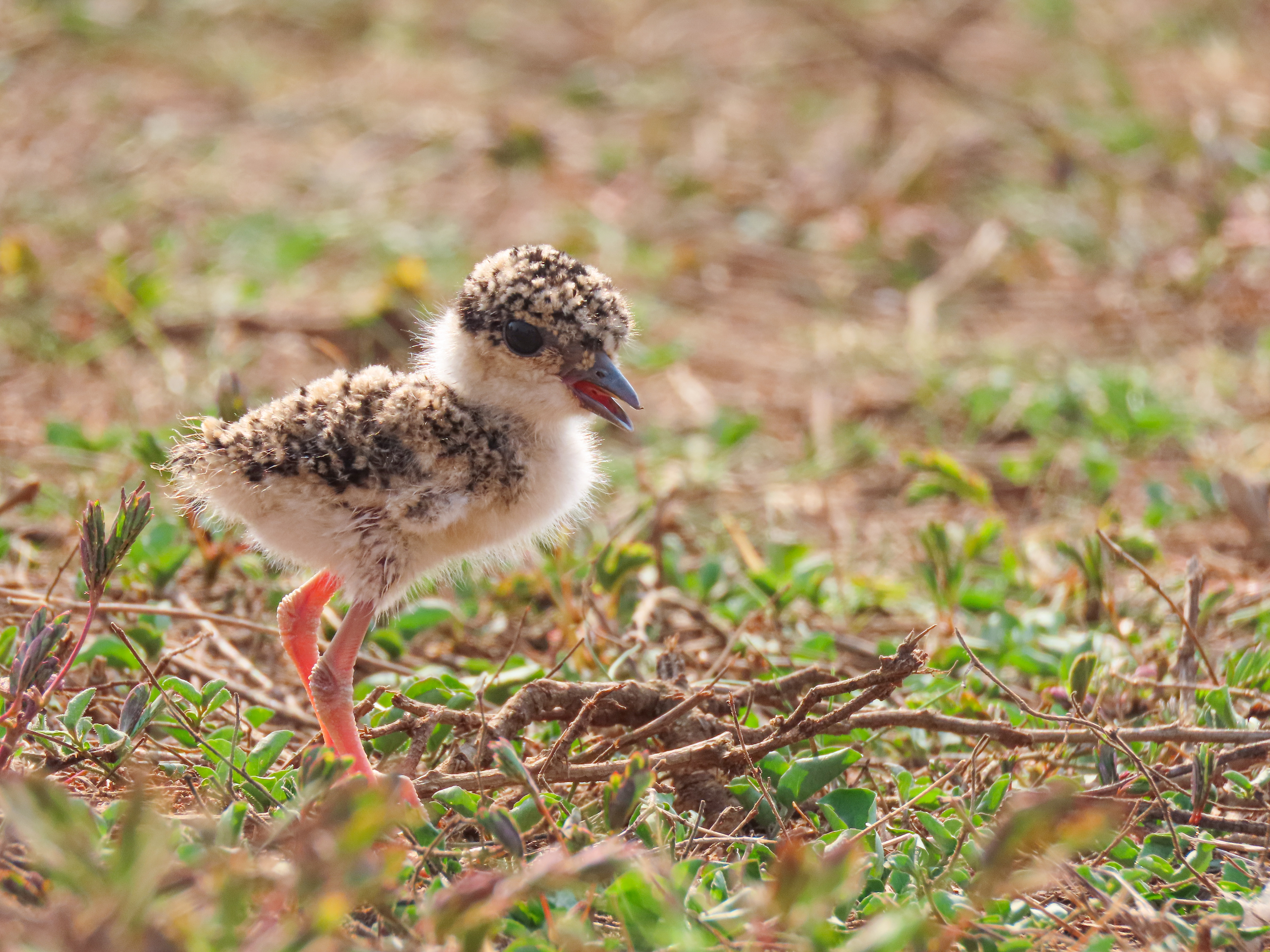
Nidifugous chick

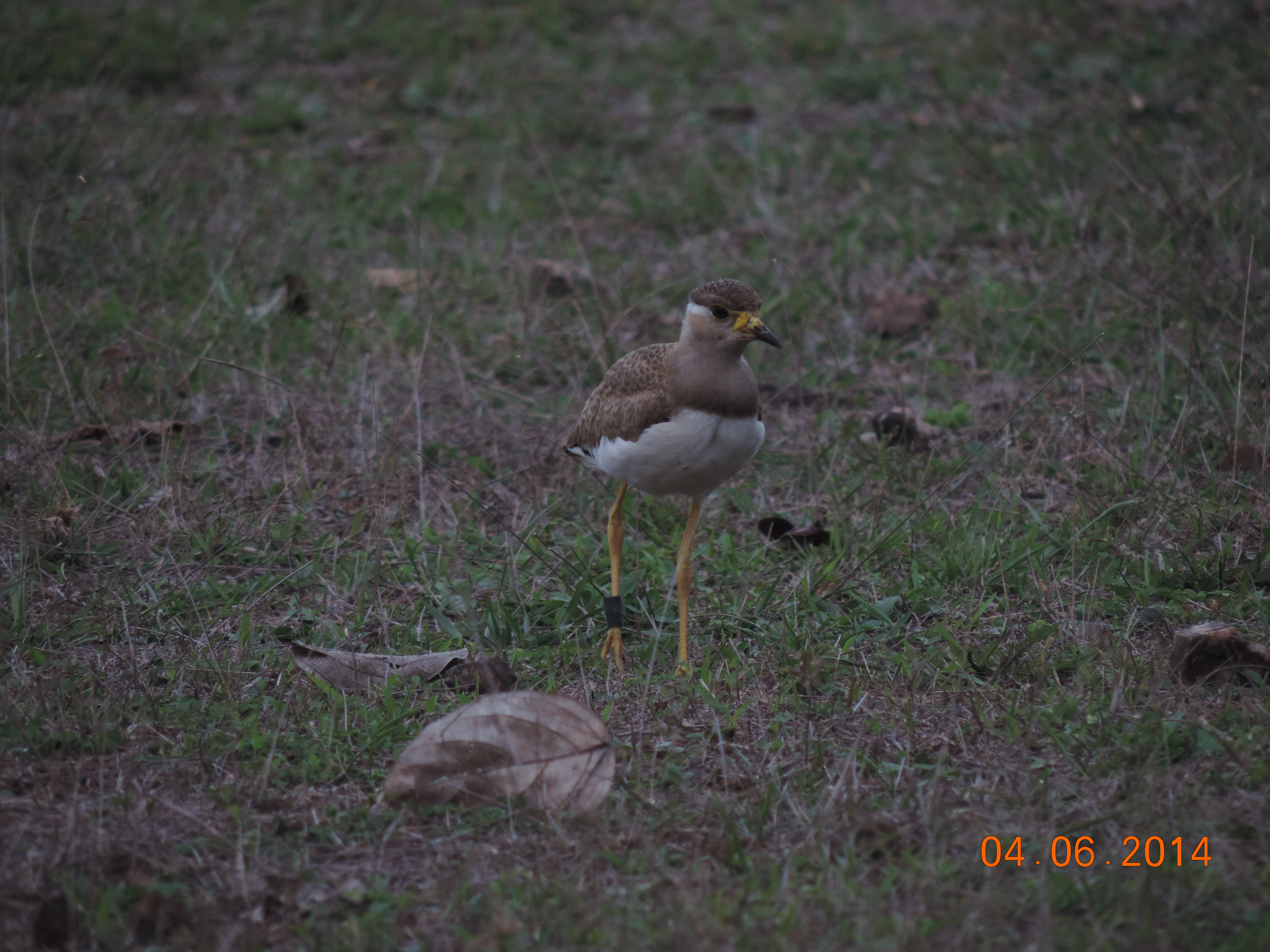
Young bird (7 weeks old)

== Other sources ==
- Dhindsa, MS (1983). "Yellow-wattled Lapwing: a rare species in Haryana and Punjab". Pavo. 21 (1&2): 103–104.
- Jayakar, SD; Spurway, H (1965). "Interference with a nest site of the Yellow-wattled Lapwing". Newsletter for Birdwatchers. 5 (6): 5.
- Jayakar, SD; Spurway, H (1965). "Interference with a nest site of the Yellow-wattled Lapwing". Newsletter for Birdwatchers. 5 (8): 6–7.
- Rao, Janaki Rama; Vikramrka, A. & Chari, N. (1983). "Flight characteristics, moment of inertia of the wing and flight behaviour of yellow-wattled lapwing Lobipluvia malabarica (Boddaert)". Comp. Physiol. Ecol. 8: 1–4.
