= Zafar Futehally =

Indian naturalist and conservationist (1920–2013)

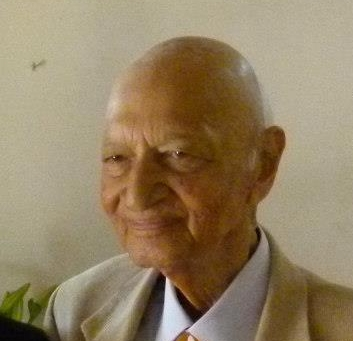
- Born: March 19, 1920; Bombay, Bombay Presidency, British India
- Died: August 11, 2013 (aged 93)
- Education: St. Xavier's College, Mumbai
- Spouse: Laeeq Futehally
- Children: 3, including Zai Whitaker
- Relatives: Romulus Whitaker (son-in-law)
- Family: Tyabji family
- Awards: 1971 Padma Shri; 1981 Order of the Golden Ark

Zafar Rashid Futehally (19 March 1920 – 11 August 2013) was an Indian naturalist and conservationist best known for his work as the secretary of the Bombay Natural History Society and for founding the Newsletter for Birdwatchers, a periodical that helped birdwatchers around India communicate their observations. Awarded Padma Shri by the Government of India in the year 1971, Zafar Futehally was also honoured with Dutch order of merit the Order of the Golden Ark in 1981 and Karnataka Rajyotsava award by the Government of Karnataka in 1983.

== Early life and education ==
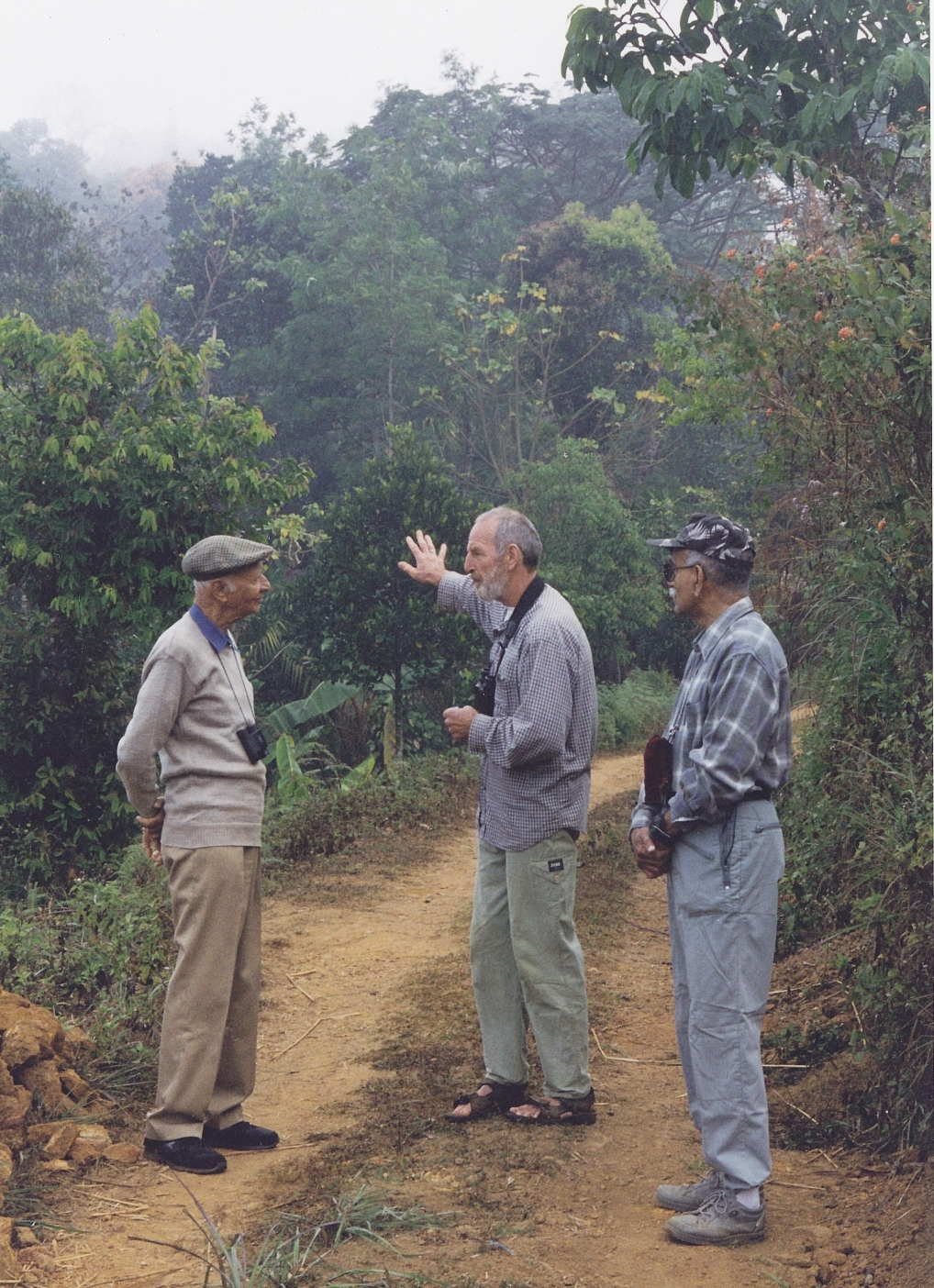
Zafar Futehally (at left) in Kerala in January 2002

Zafar Futehally was born in Andheri in 1920. The family lived at Gulshun, a property bought from Homi Mody in 1918. This land was mortgaged by his father to establish N. Futehally & Co., one of the first Indian companies to deal in the export of cotton to and import of textiles from Japan. In 1924 the family moved to Kobe in Japan to run the company branch and returned to India only in 1927. Futehally studied economics at St. Xavier's College in Bombay. Graduating with a BA in economics and political science in 1941 he wrote the public service commission examination, stood 84 among 3400 candidates and went through several interviews but did not get selected.

== Career ==
He was then offered work at his brother's company, Dynacraft Machine Company from 1942. The company was run along with his brother and cousin but in 1985 the Futehally brothers were removed from the board. Zafar's maternal grandfather was Badruddin Tyabji, the eminent lawyer and president of the Indian National Congress and was a distant cousin of Salim Ali.

Zafar was married to Laeeq Futehally (1921-6 July 2014), a niece of Salim Ali, on 19 December 1943. They had three children: a son, Murad, and two daughters Zahida (Zai) and Shama who also took to writing. Zai wrote biographies of Romulus Whitaker and Salim Ali. Shama (d. 2004) was the author of novels "Tara Lane" and "Reaching Bombay Central", a translator of the Meera Bhajans and Urdu poetry apart from numerous other literary works.

In 1972, Zafar moved to Bangalore where he lived for a while in the Palace orchards area before moving to a farm house in Dodda Gubbi on the outskirts of Bangalore. Laeeq took her skills in gardening and landscaping while also writing on the topic in a column in the Deccan Herald. A dacoit attack in 1987 at their home in Dodda Gubbi forced the couple to move to Kodaikanal with their daughter Zai for four years before returning to live in Koramangala in Bangalore. In Kodaikanal, they worked with the Palani Hills Conservation Council. In 2013 he left Bangalore to move back to his home in Kihim. He died on 11 August 2013 at his home in Kihim, following a bronchial infection. He was cremated at Kihim according to his wishes.

=== Ornithology and conservation ===
In 1944 Salim Ali invited the couple to his camp in Palanpur, Saurashtra where he was running a bird survey. From this point, Futehally regularly joined Salim on camps. Somewhere in the 1950s a poorly written newspaper article in the Times of India on the magpie robin received the ire of Salim Ali and the editor, N.J. Nanporia, asked Salim if he could suggest someone who could write for the newspaper on birds. Zafar Futehally took the suggestion and started a column called Birdwatcher's Diary which ran for thirty years (second in longevity to the column of Madhaviah Krishnan). This also led to radio shows which became quite popular. Around the 1950s Laeeq joined Quest magazine produced by the Indian Committee for Cultural Freedom led by Minoo Masani which was partly sponsored by the CIA. Futehally founded the Newsletter for Birdwatchers, a periodical, in 1959. In 1962 Futehally became a member of the executive committee of the Bombay Natural History Society and later its Honorary Secretary, a position that he held until 1973 when he moved from Bombay to Bangalore. A dispute between Humayun Abdulali and Salim Ali led to the latter resigning from the position of Vice President. In 1959 there was WHO interest in the study of Kyasanur forest disease and it was suggested that this was being carried by migratory birds. A study was begun with Salim Ali heading the project. Alfred Schifferli from the Sempach Ornithological Station helped train them in mist netting and other handling techniques. The "Newsletter" included Salim Ali, Biswamoy Biswas and other eminent ornithologists of its time on the editorial board and was for many years mimeographed and distributed to subscribers in India and outside. In later years the covers were printed and still later the entire issue was printed. The newsletter encouraged an essay style of writing and some authors like Ramachandra Guha found their first opportunity to publish in it. The Newsletter for Birdwatchers continues to be popular among birdwatchers interested in the India region. The newsletter also pioneered large-scale collaborative studies on birds.

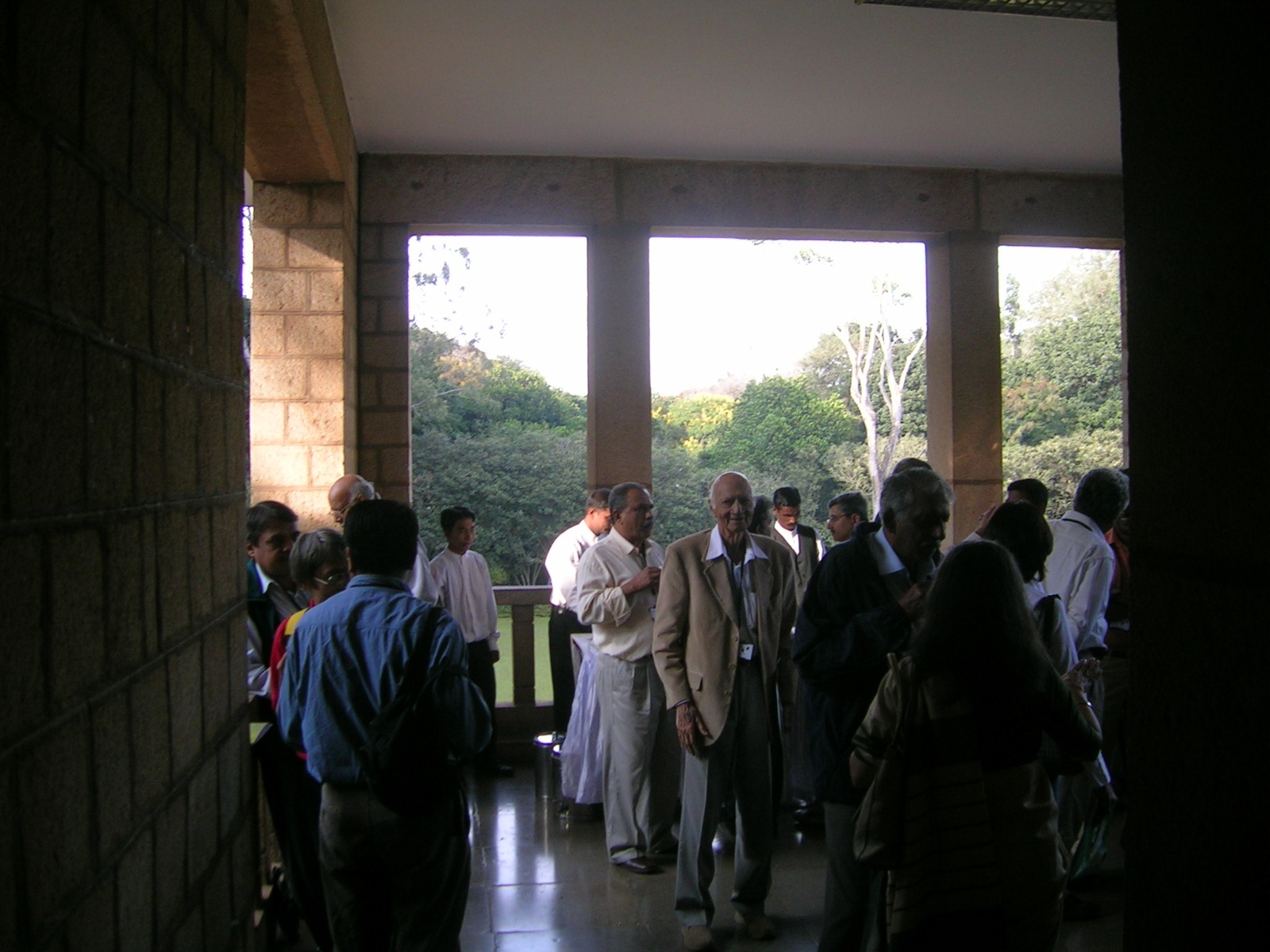
In November 2008 at a meeting to organize an ornithological federation in India, Raman Research Institute

In 1965 he was involved in organizing the IUCN meeting at New Delhi and became a member of its executive board in 1966. He became Vice-President of the IUCN in 1969, received the Padma Shri in 1970, Order of the Golden Ark in 1980 and the Karnataka Rajyotsava award of 1983. In 1973, Futehally was a member of the committee that was set up to study the impact of a dam on the river Kuntipuzha which threatened to destroy the forests of the Silent Valley region. He was also a steering group member of Project Tiger, during the early years of its establishment.

Futehally founded the Bangalore Environment Trust along with Satish Dhawan, Venkatraman Radhakrishnan (Sir C.V. Raman's son) and others in 1987. The organization took an interest in the conservation of lakes and trees in and around Bangalore. In December 2000 he underwent a by-pass surgery Towards the end of 2003, following a cataract removal, he allowed the first few issues of the 2004 Newsletter for Birdwatchers to be guest edited however this led to differences between the guest editors and the publisher leading to a break up of the Newsletter. A new newsletter was launched and he became an emeritus editor for the periodical, Indian Birds.

=== Conservation debates ===
During his position at the BNHS and the World Wildlife Fund he was able to lobby for action, chiefly by influencing the then Prime Minister Indira Gandhi. His letters to the government helped in the establishment of Karnala bird sanctuary in Raigad in the 1960s, instead of being earmarked for industrial development. In the 1970s, he supported Dillon Ripley and the Smithsonian Institution for a project that proposed to radio-collar and study tigers in India. The project met with considerable resistance, with Kailash Sankhala and Madhaviah Krishnan suggesting that Indians could conduct such studies on their own. Ripley's past in the OSS and politics related to PL 480 grants in India were also to influence the refusal of the Indian government to permit Smithsonian research. Futehally, who was then in WWF-India, was criticized for his support since the IUCN and WWF international did not support the Smithsonian proposal. Ripley subsequently engineered a coup in WWF-US which involved the overthrow of its president, C. R. Gutermuth, on the ground that he had taken up a conflicting position as president of the National Rifle Association of America. The Smithsonian tiger tracking project was finally funded in part by WWF-US but were able to obtain permission only in Nepal.

In later years, he continued to write about conservation issues particularly in Bangalore. In one issue, the government of Karnataka handed over lakes (particularly Hebbal Lake) within the city to private hoteliers and water-based entertainment companies. This was opposed by many citizens as being contradictory to the role of government in public welfare. Zafar Futehally held the view that private enterprise could be conservation and welfare-oriented, a view which did not receive widespread support.

=== Publications ===
Futehally wrote numerous popular articles in the media. One of his early publications on a Paradise Flycatcher inspired the Indian poet Nissim Ezekiel to write a poem about it. As the founder and editor of the Newsletter for Birdwatchers, he selected articles from bird enthusiasts and friends in India as well as from outside. The articles were selected for readability rather than dry scientific communication although many scientific observations were made in its pages. He also edited and published an anthology of writings by Indian birdwatchers, "India through its birds", which was published in 2007.

In 2014, his memoirs were posthumously published as a book, The Song of the Magpie Robin.

== Bibliography ==
- Futehally, Zafar (with Shanthi and Ashish Chandola) (2014) The Song of the Magpie Robin. Rupa Publications, New Delhi.
