= Newsletter for Birdwatchers =

Indian periodical

- Former editors: Zafar Futehally
- Categories: Ornithology, Birdwatching
- Frequency: Bimonthly
- Publisher: Navbharat Enterprises
- First issue: 1960
- Final issue: November/December 2012
- Country: India
- Language: English
- Website: www.nlbw.co.cc
- ISSN: 0028-9426
- OCLC: 183422131

Newsletter for Birdwatchers is an Indian periodical of ornithology and birdwatching founded in 1960 by Zafar Futehally, who edited it until 2003. It was initially mimeographed and distributed to a small number of subscribers each month. It is one of the oldest periodicals devoted to ornithology in India. The editorial board in its early years included Salim Ali, Biswamoy Biswas and other ornithologists in the region. The present editorial board includes many ornithologists, viz., Dr. A.M.K. Bharos, Dr. S.P. Bhatnagar, Dr. A.K. Chakravarthy, Dr. Ranjan Kumar Das, Dr. S. Devasahayam, Dr. Raju Kasambe, B.S. Kulkarni, Dr. Dipankar Lahkar, Arvind Mishra, Dr. Geeta S. Padate, K. Mrutumjaya Rao, A.N. Yellappa Reddy, Dr. Rajiv Saxena, Dr. A.B. Shanbhag, Arunayan Sharma, Dr. Hiren B. Soni, S. Shreyas, S. Sridhar and Dr. Abraham Verghese as in January 2022. The nature of the articles are largely informal and often essay-like. Important observations were often republished in other journals such as the Journal of the Bombay Natural History Society, however the outreach of more serious journals to amateur birdwatchers in the region was limited.

It was later produced once in two months in a printed form by S. Sridhar of Navbharat Press in Bangalore who took up both the publication and editorship in 2003 when Futehally shifted affiliation to another periodical named Indian Birds which was published from Hyderabad. It was then published every two months in English from Bangalore. The magazine is still published bimonthly.Now it is celebrating its Diamond Jubilee of publications. All the issues up to December 2020 are uploaded on its website (https://sites.google.com/view/nlbw).
