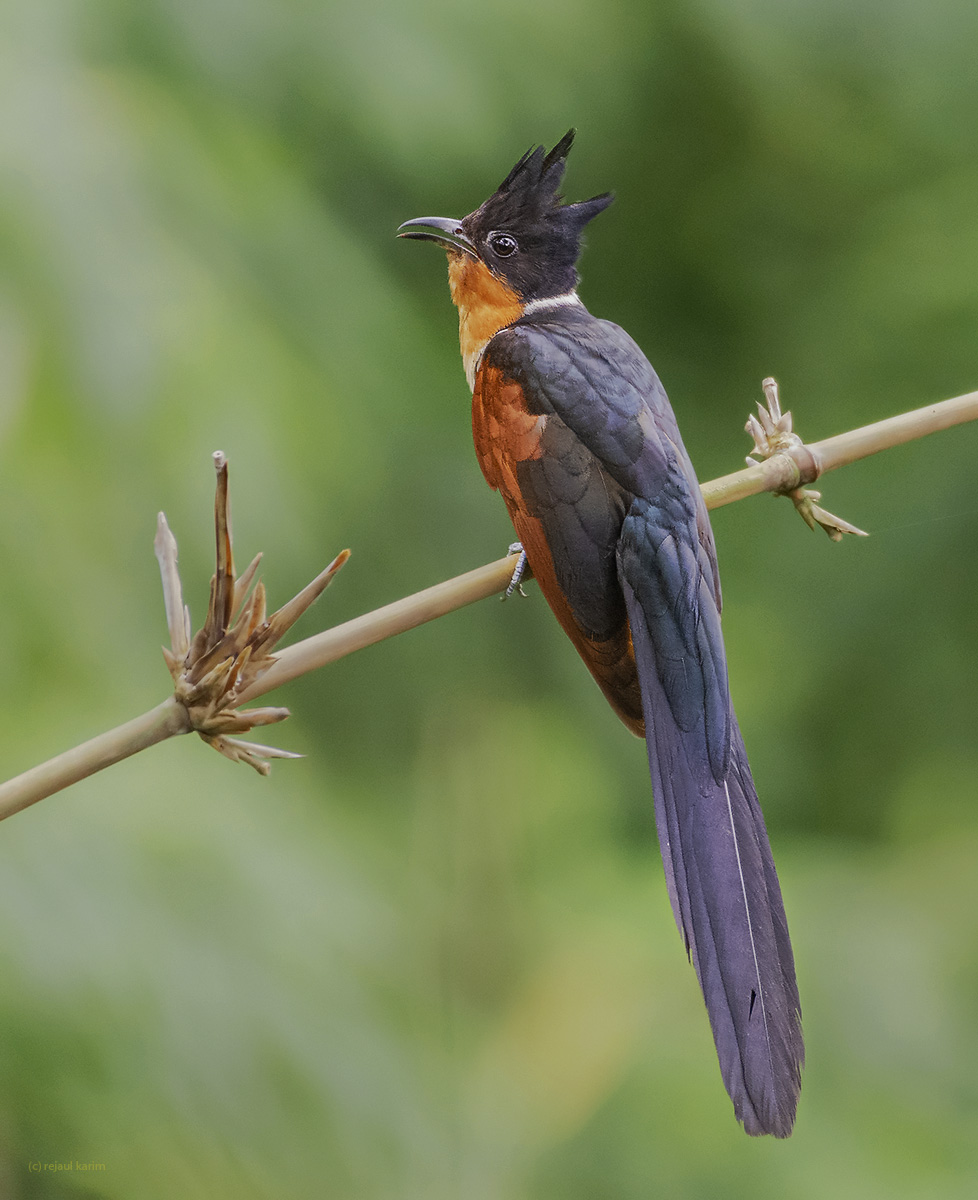
- Chestnut-winged cuckoo in Guwahati, Assam, July 2020

Conservation status
- Least Concern (IUCN 3.1)

Scientific classification
- Kingdom: Animalia
- Phylum: Chordata
- Class: Aves
- Order: Cuculiformes
- Family: Cuculidae
- Genus: Clamator
- Species: C. coromandus

Binomial name
- Clamator coromandus (Linnaeus, 1766)

Synonyms
- Cuculus coromandus Linnaeus, 1766

= Chestnut-winged cuckoo =

Species of bird

The chestnut-winged cuckoo or red-winged crested cuckoo (Clamator coromandus) is a cuckoo found in Southeast Asia and parts of South Asia. It has dark glossy upperparts, a black head with long crest chestnut wings, a long graduated glossy black tail, rufous throat dusky underside and a narrow white nuchal half collar. They breed along the Himalayas and migrate south in winter to Sri Lanka, southern India and tropical Southeast Asia including parts of Indonesia, Thailand and the Philippines. It is about 47 cm (19 in) long.

== Description ==
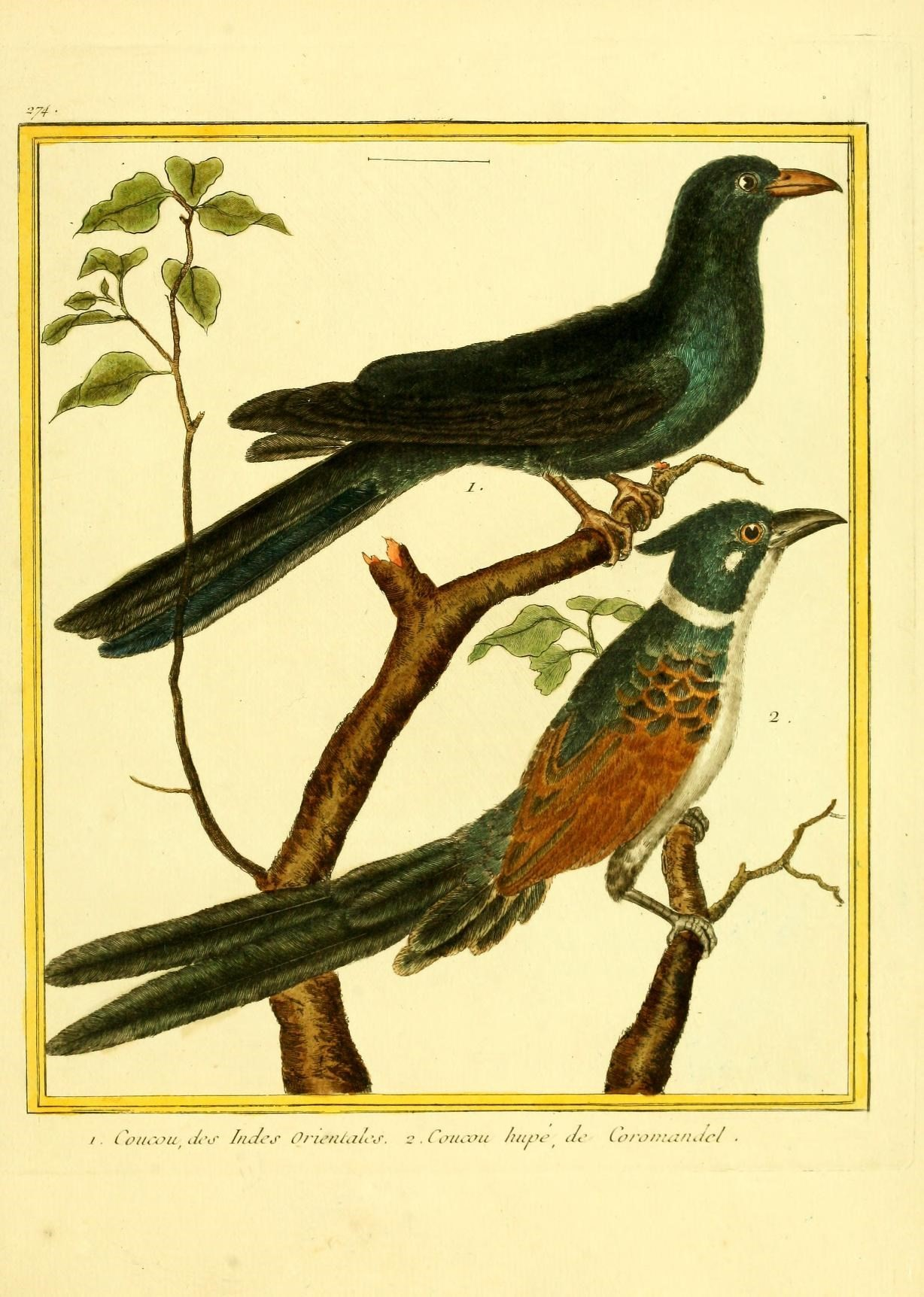
Drawing, 18th Century. In the rear an asian koel, in front a chestnut-winged cuckoo

This dark and crested cuckoo has chestnut wings, a glossy black crest and a graduated tail (the feathers shortening in steps from the center outwards) whose terminal edges are white and inconspicuous unlike the white tips of the Jacobin cuckoo which is found in parts of its range. The black capping on the head is broken from black of the back by a white collar that extends to the sides of the neck. The lower parts are rufous turning to dark grey towards the vent. Young birds are dusky with a scaly appearance to the wing feathers.

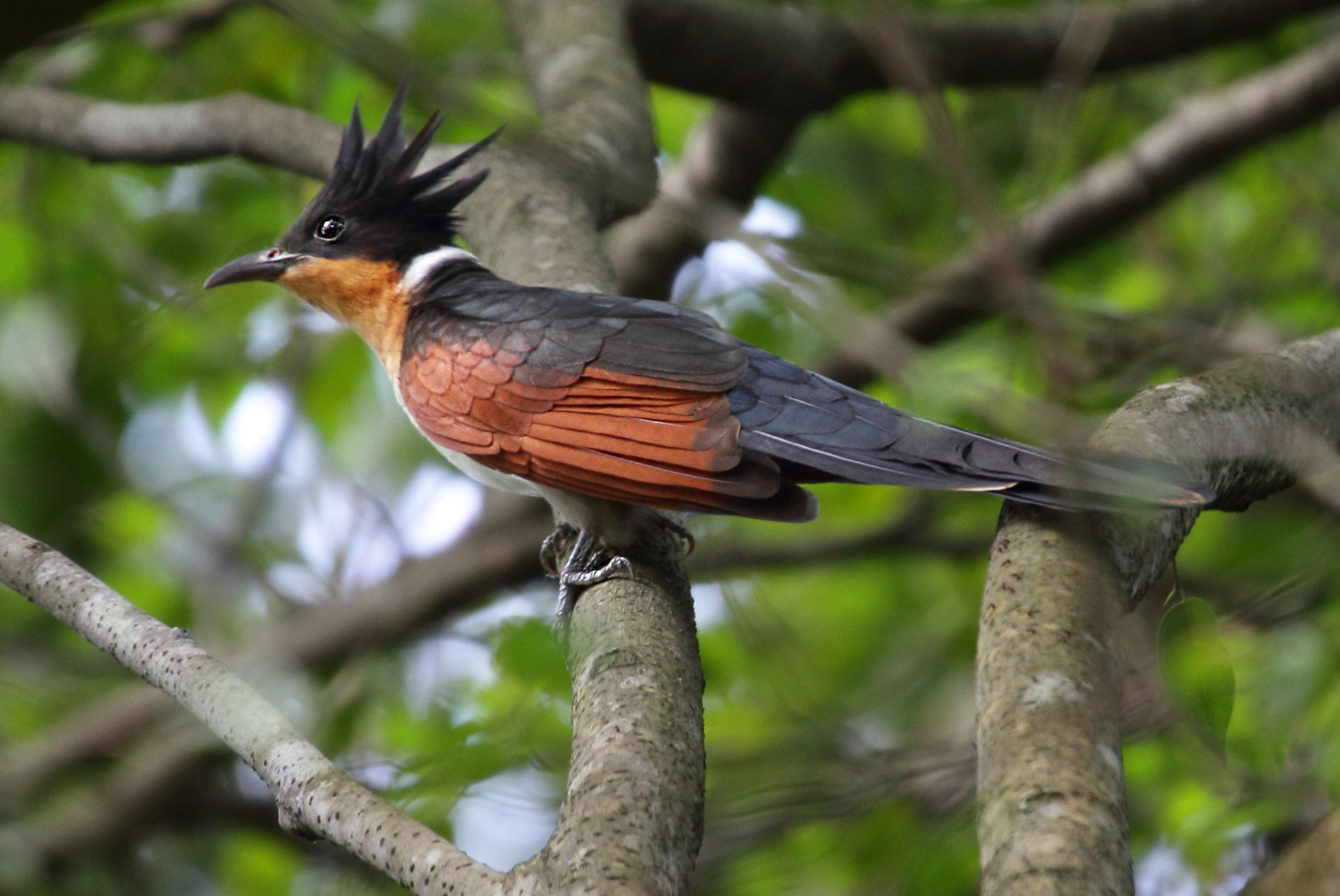
Chestnut-winged cuckoo in Singapore, Dec 2012, by William Lee

== Taxonomy ==
The species was first given its binomial name by Linnaeus in 1766. His description of what he called Cuculus coromandus was based on the notes of Brisson who described the bird as "Le coucou hupрé de Coromandel" which was collected on the Coromandel coast of India (probably near Pondicherry which was a French colony). Buffon noticed the close relation to the Jacobin cuckoo and called it "le Jacobin huppé de Coromande". The species was later placed under the genus names of Coccystes, Oxylophus before being placed in Clamator.

== Distribution ==
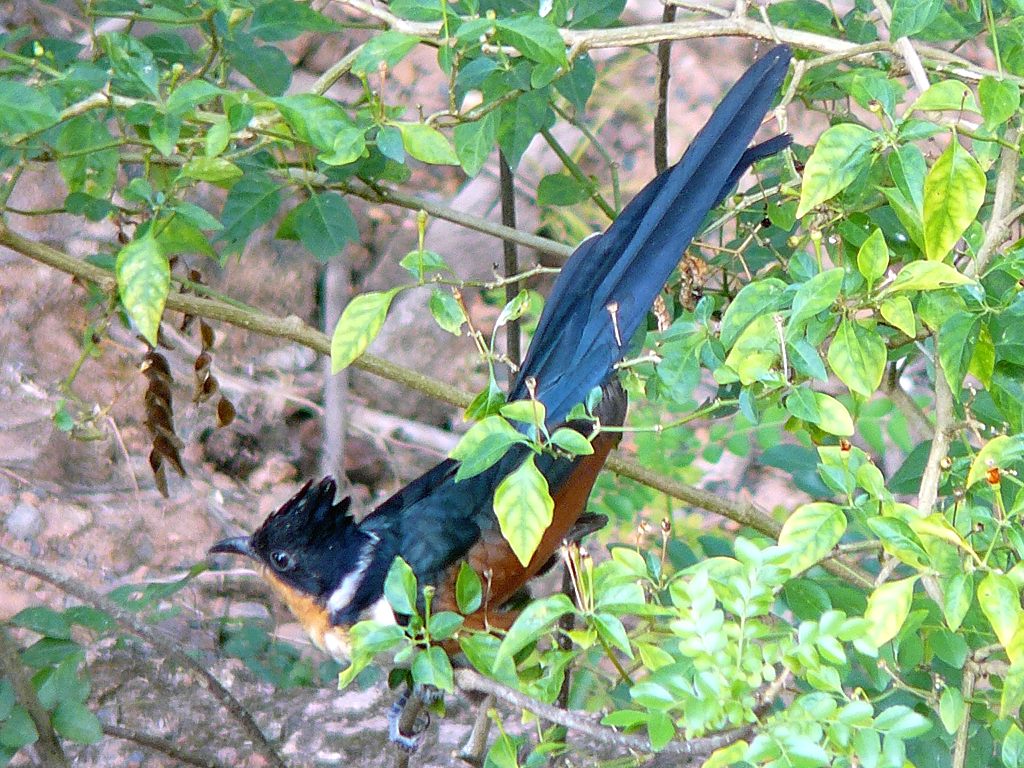
In Kerala, India

The species is found from the western Himalayas to the eastern Himalayas and extends into Southeast Asia. It has been recorded from India, Nepal, China, Indonesia, Laos, Bhutan, Bangladesh, Cambodia, Thailand, Myanmar, Malaysia, Vietnam, Sri Lanka and the Philippines. Some populations may be non-migratory.

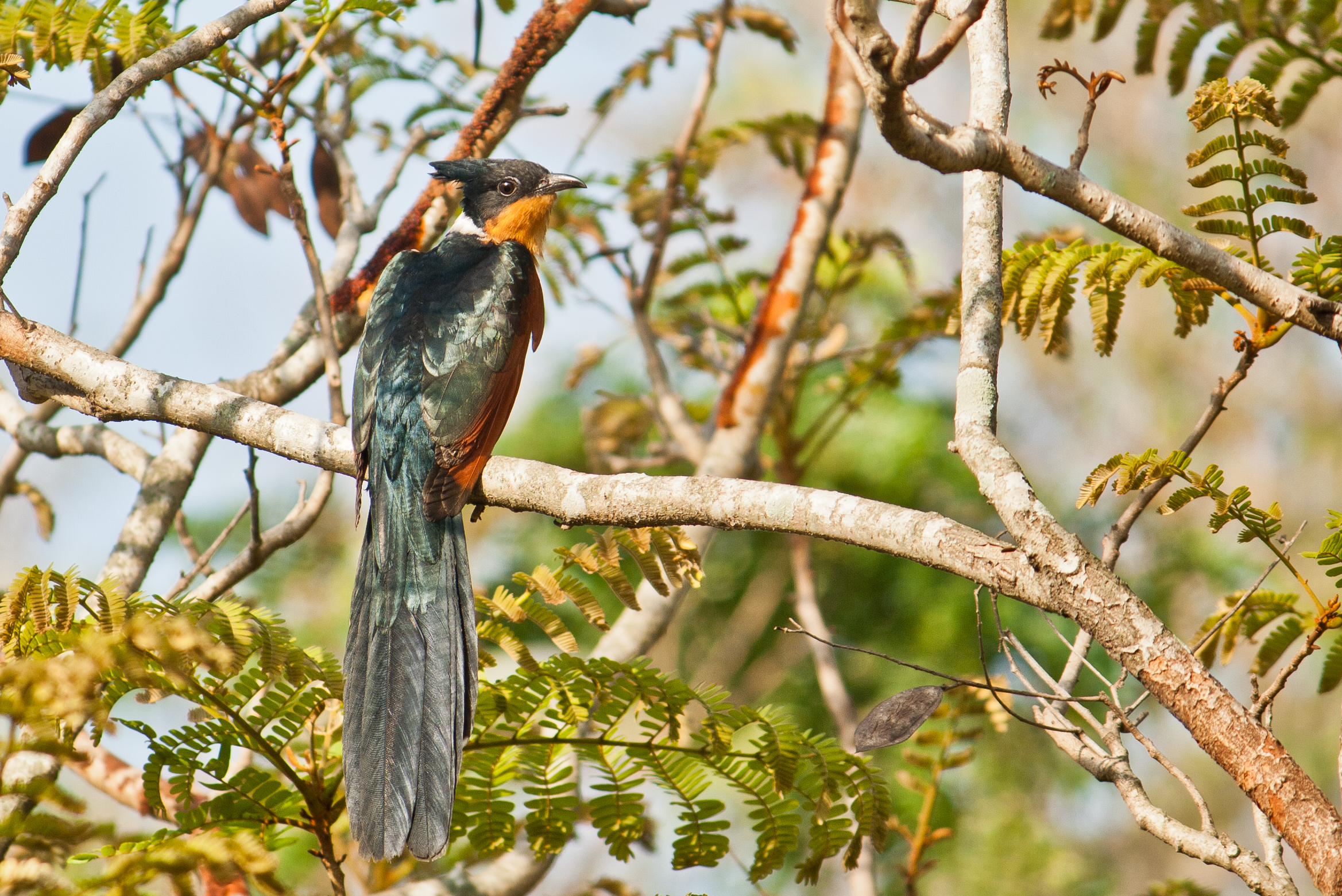
In Chennai

During migration in India, it moves along the Eastern Ghats in its southward migration with exhausted individuals often being discovered in the vicinity of homes. In mid-October, they are found in numbers at Point Calimere, possibly into Sri Lanka. Some appear to winter in the Western Ghats.

== Behaviour ==
This cuckoo sometimes joins mixed species foraging flocks and is usually seen singly.

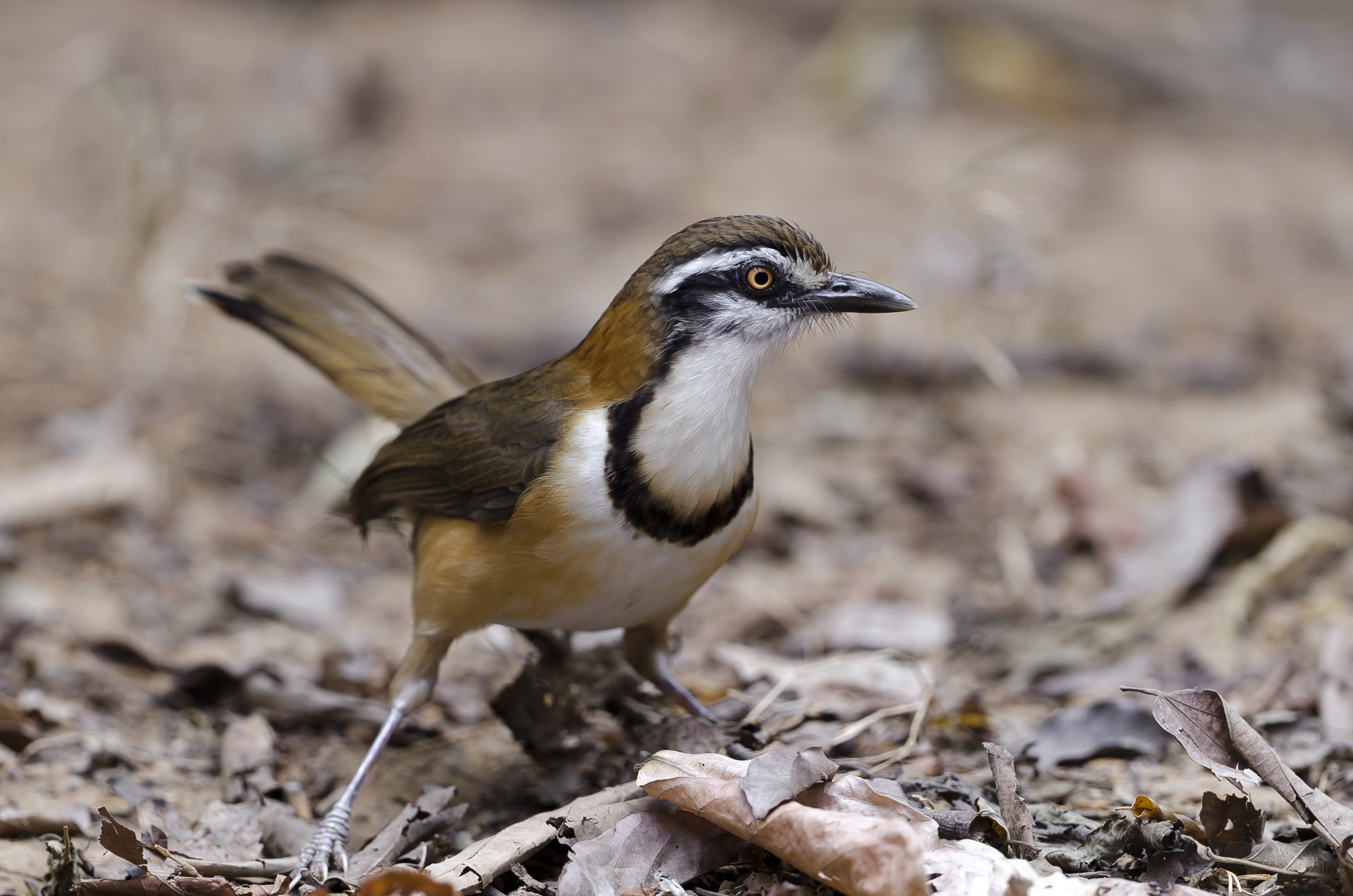
Garrulax monileger, the most frequently parasitised host bird of the Chestnut-winged Cuckoo

As a brood parasite, the breeding season is in summer and it is said to lay its eggs mainly in the nest of Garrulax laughingthrushes, especially G. monileger and G. pectoralis. The eggs are very spherical. The calls include fluty twin-notes repeated with short intervals.
