= Jungle babbler =

Jungle Babbler

Conservation status
- Least Concern (IUCN 3.1)

Scientific classification
- Kingdom: Animalia
- Phylum: Chordata
- Class: Aves
- Order: Passeriformes
- Family: Leiothrichidae
- Genus: Argya
- Species: A. striata

Binomial name
- Argya striata (Dumont, 1823)

Synonyms
- Turdoides striatus Malacocercus terricolor Cossyphus striatus Crateropus canorus

Species of bird

The jungle babbler (Argya striata) is a member of the family Leiothrichidae found in the South Asian subcontinent. Jungle babblers are gregarious birds that forage in small groups of six to ten birds, a habit that has given them the popular name of "seven sisters" in urban Northern India, and (seven brothers) in Bengali, with cognates in other regional languages which also mean "seven brothers".

The jungle babbler is a common resident breeding bird in most parts of the South Asian subcontinent and is often seen in gardens within large cities as well as in forested areas. In the past, the orange-billed babbler Argya rufescens of Sri Lanka was considered to be a subspecies of jungle babbler, but has now been elevated to a species.

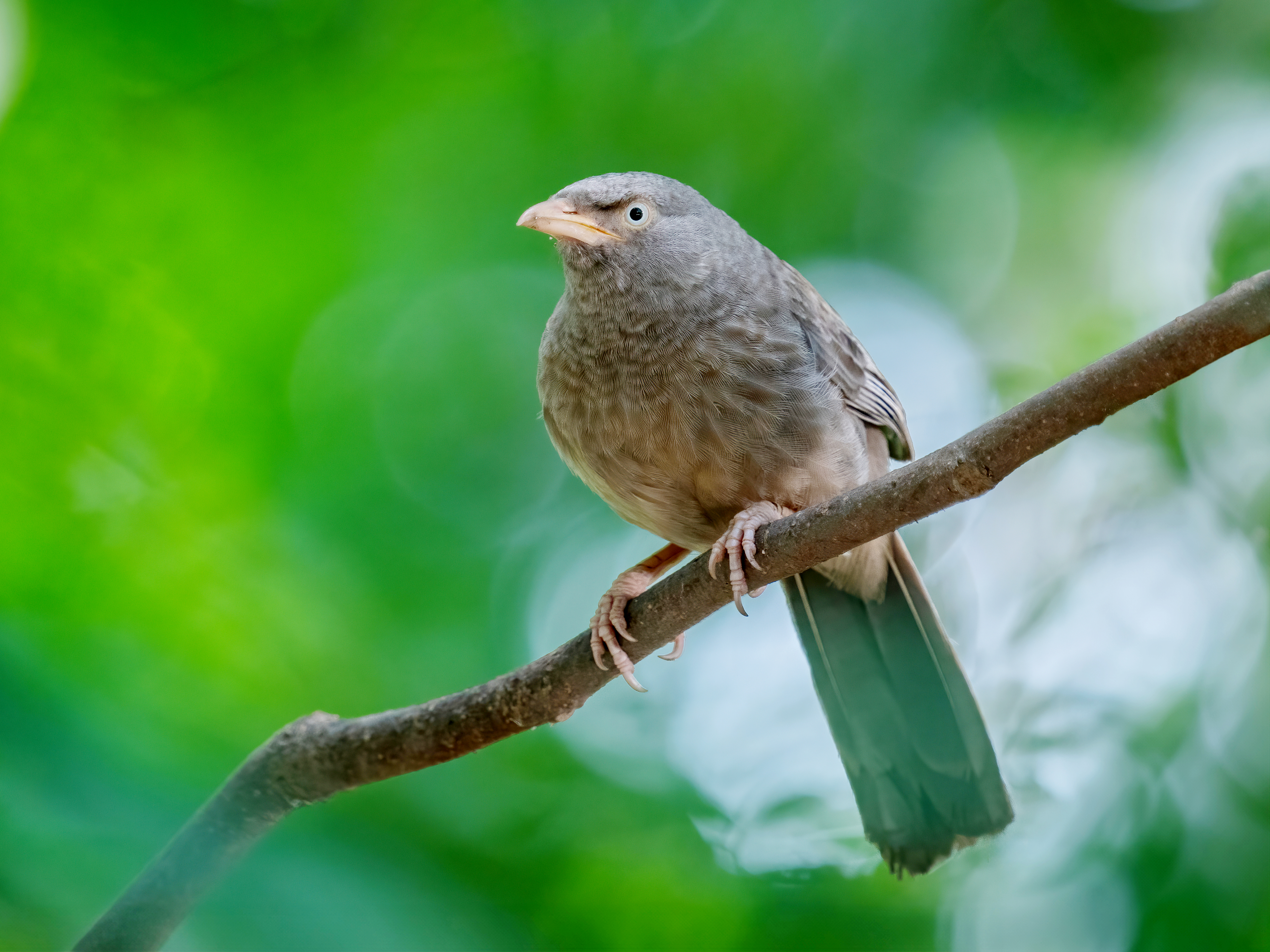
Argya striata striata at Koshi Tappu Wildlife Reserve, Nepal

== Taxonomy ==
The jungle babbler was described by the French zoologist Charles Dumont de Sainte Croix in 1823, based on specimens from Bengal. He coined the binomial name Cossyphus striatus. This babbler was formerly placed in the genus Turdoides but following the publication of a comprehensive molecular phylogenetic study in 2018, it was moved to the resurrected genus Argya.

There are several named geographically isolated subspecies that show plumage shade differences. Former race rufescens of Sri Lanka is considered a full species. The widely accepted subspecies include:

- A. s. striata (Dumont de Sainte Croix, 1823) which is found over much of northern India south of the Himalayan foothills extending to Himachal Pradesh, Uttar Pradesh, Bhutan, Assam, Odisha and northeastern Andhra Pradesh. The form found in parts of Odisha, orissae, is said to be more rufous above and is usually subsumed into this.
- A. s. sindiana (Ticehurst, 1920) is a paler desert form that is found in the Indus River plains of Pakistan and extends into Rajasthan and the Rann of Kutch in India.
- A. s. somervillei (Sykes, 1832) is found in the northern Western Ghats.
- A. s. malabarica (Jerdon, 1845) is found in the southern Western Ghats.
- A. s. orientalis (Jerdon, 1845) is found in peninsular India east of the Western Ghats.

Some older literature can be confusing due to some incorrect usage, such as with Whistler (1944, Spolia Zeylanica, 23:131), who used the name affinis which is a completely different species, Argya affinis, restricted to peninsular India. Although the two can sometimes be confused in poor lighting conditions, their calls are entirely different.

== Description ==
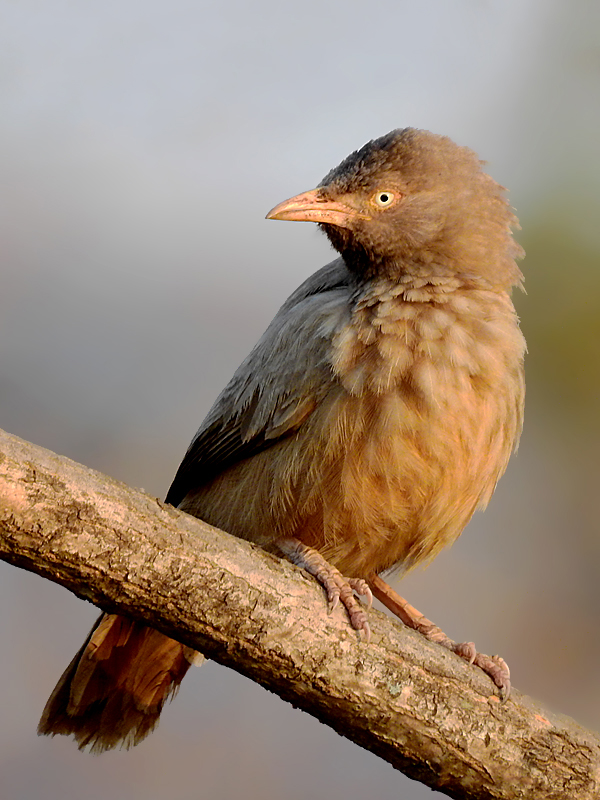
Adult A. s. somervillei from Maharashtra.

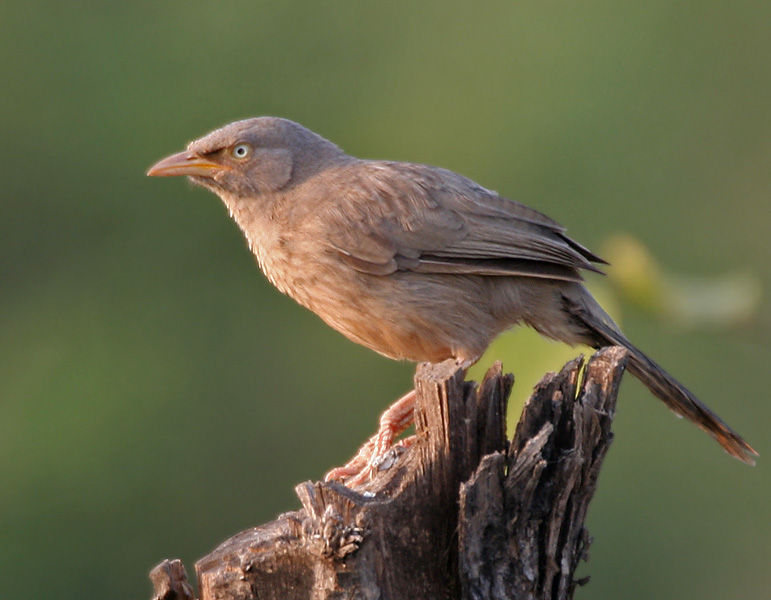
Adult A. s. orientalis in Kawal, A.P., India.

The jungle babbler's habitat is forest and cultivation. This species, like most babblers, is non-migratory, and has short rounded wings and a weak flight. The sexes are identical, drably coloured in brownish grey with a yellow-bill making them confusable only with the endemic yellow-billed babblers of peninsular India and Sri Lanka. The upper parts are usually slightly darker in shade and there is some mottling on the throat and breast. Subspecies somervillei of Maharashtra has a very rufous tail and dark primary flight feathers. The jungle babbler can be separated from the white-headed babbler by the dark loreal zone between the bill and the eye as well as the lack of a contrasting light crown. The calls of the two species are however distinct and unmistakable. The jungle babbler has harsh nasal calls while the white-headed babbler has high pitched calls. Another babbler that is similarly found in urban areas is the large grey babbler; however, that species has a distinctive long tail with white outer tail feathers.

The jungle babbler lives in flocks of seven to ten or more. It is a noisy bird, and the presence of a flock may generally be known at some distance by the harsh mewing calls, continual chattering, squeaking and chirping produced by its members.

== Behaviour and ecology ==
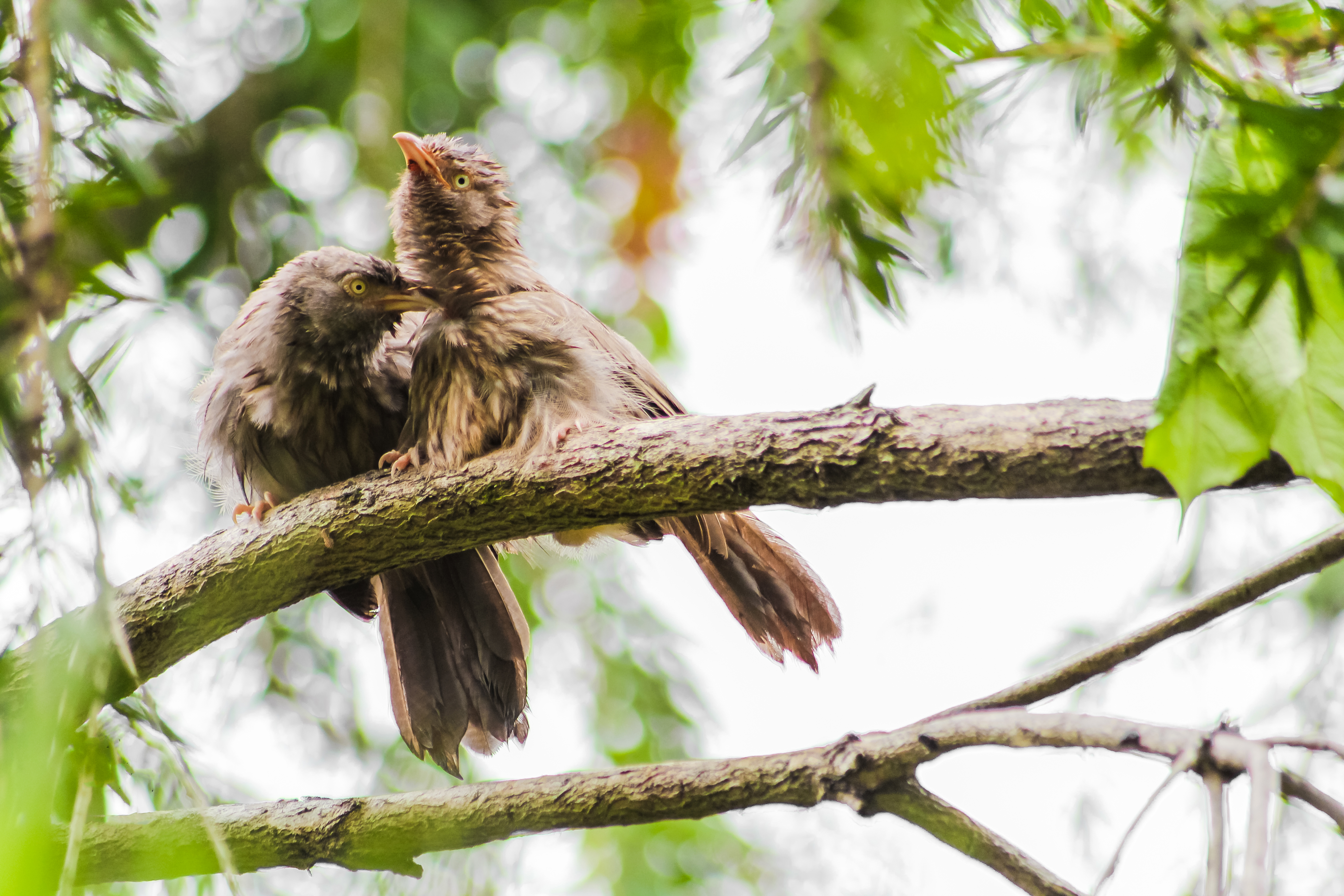
A pair from Western Ghats allopreening after a monsoon rain

Jungle babblers are gregarious and very social. They sometimes form the core of a mixed-species foraging flock. They feed mainly on insects, but also eat grains, nectar and berries. The groups maintain territories and will defend them against neighbours, which are nevertheless sometimes tolerated. For their size, they are long lived and have been noted to live as long as 16.5 years in captivity.

When foraging, some birds take up a high vantage point and act as sentinels. They are known to gather and mob potential predators such as snakes. A study of their activity budget showed them to have greater similarity to social primates than to comparable birds.

Young birds have a dark iris. Older birds have an iris of a pale creamy colour and it has been found that the iris has a dark epithelium, which becomes invisible when the muscle fibres develop in the iris and make the dark basal colours invisible and thus appear cream-coloured.

They breed throughout the year, with peak breeding in northern India being noted between March–April and July–September. Birds reach sexual maturity after their third year. The nest is built halfway up in a tree, concealed in dense masses of foliage. The normal clutch is three or four (but can be up to seven) deep greenish blue eggs. In northern India, birds breeding during July–September tend to be parasitized by the pied crested cuckoo and sometimes by the common hawk-cuckoo. Helpers assist the parents in feeding the young. Post fledging survival is very high.

Parasitised jungle babblers feeding a common hawk-cuckoo.

Jungle babbler feeding their fledglings

Birds fledge and females tend to leave their natal group after about two years. Birds within a group often indulge in allopreening, play chases and mock fights. When threatened by predators, they have been said to sometimes feign death.

== In culture ==
Jungle babblers are very common near towns and cities, particularly in northern India and Southern Pakistan. They are well known for their habit of moving in groups, which has earned them the local Hindi-Urdu name Saat Bhai (meaning "seven brethren"); in English, however, this is often translated as the "Seven Sisters". Visitors to India and Pakistan are very likely to notice these vocal and active birds, and Frank Finn notes an incident during the colonial period in India:

Some years back, a new Viceroy was being shown the wonders of his temporary kingdom, and among these the Taj at Agra held, of course, an important place. Arrived before the glorious monument of Eastern love and pride, the artless Aide-de-Camp was mute; the gilded staff were still as Kipling says, in anxious expectation of the comment of His Excellency. But this, alas when it came was merely the remark: "What are those funny little birds?" The shock must have been the greater for the fact that the mean fowls thus honoured were it seems, of that singularly disreputable species which is commonly known in India as the "Seven Sisters" or "Seven Brothers," or by the Hindi and Urdu equivalent of saat-bhai.

The Indian folklorist Saratcandra Mitra recorded a belief among the Lushai-Kuki people that during a solar eclipse, humans could transform into jungle babblers.

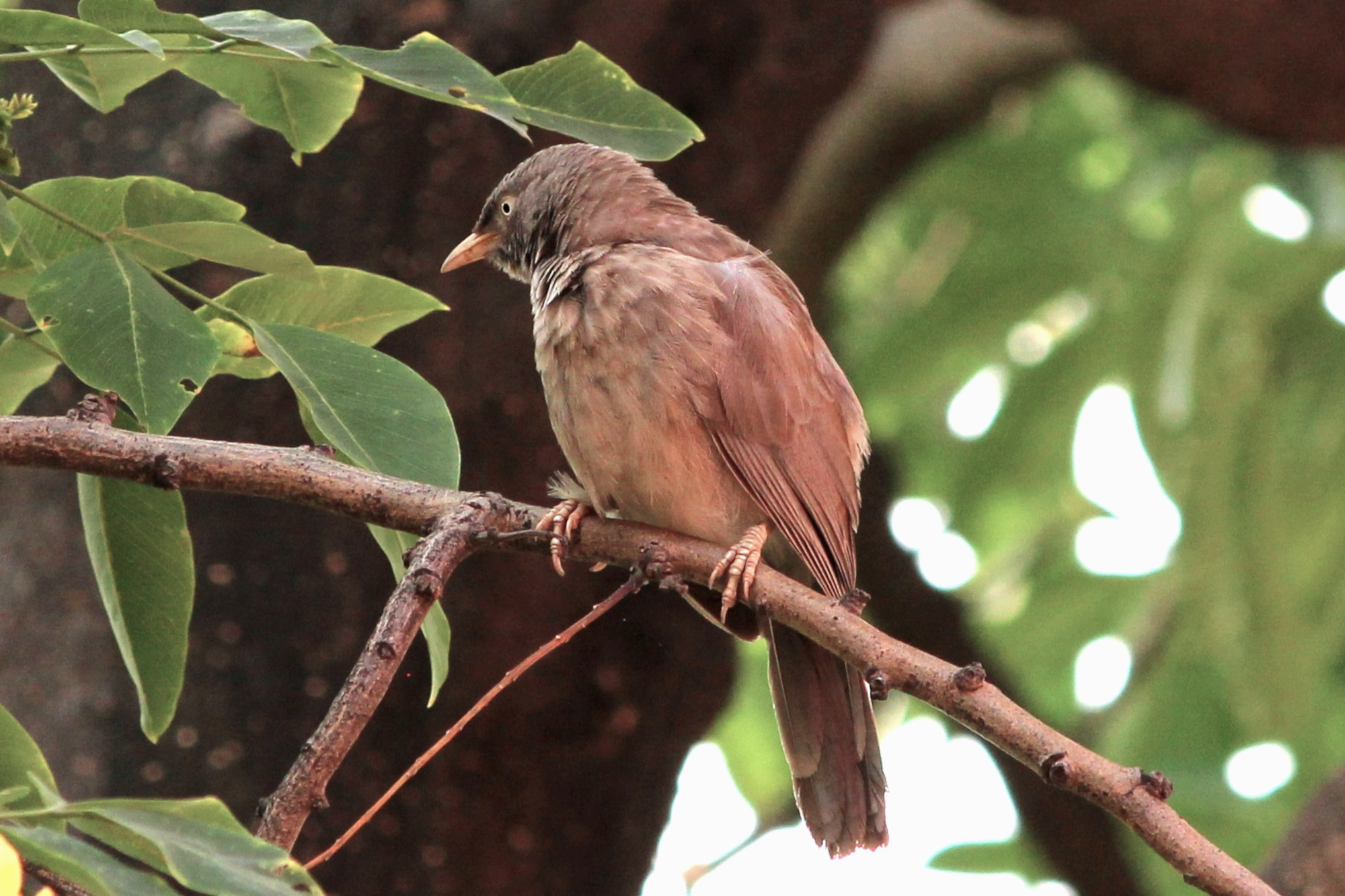
Jungle babbler in Chandigarh.

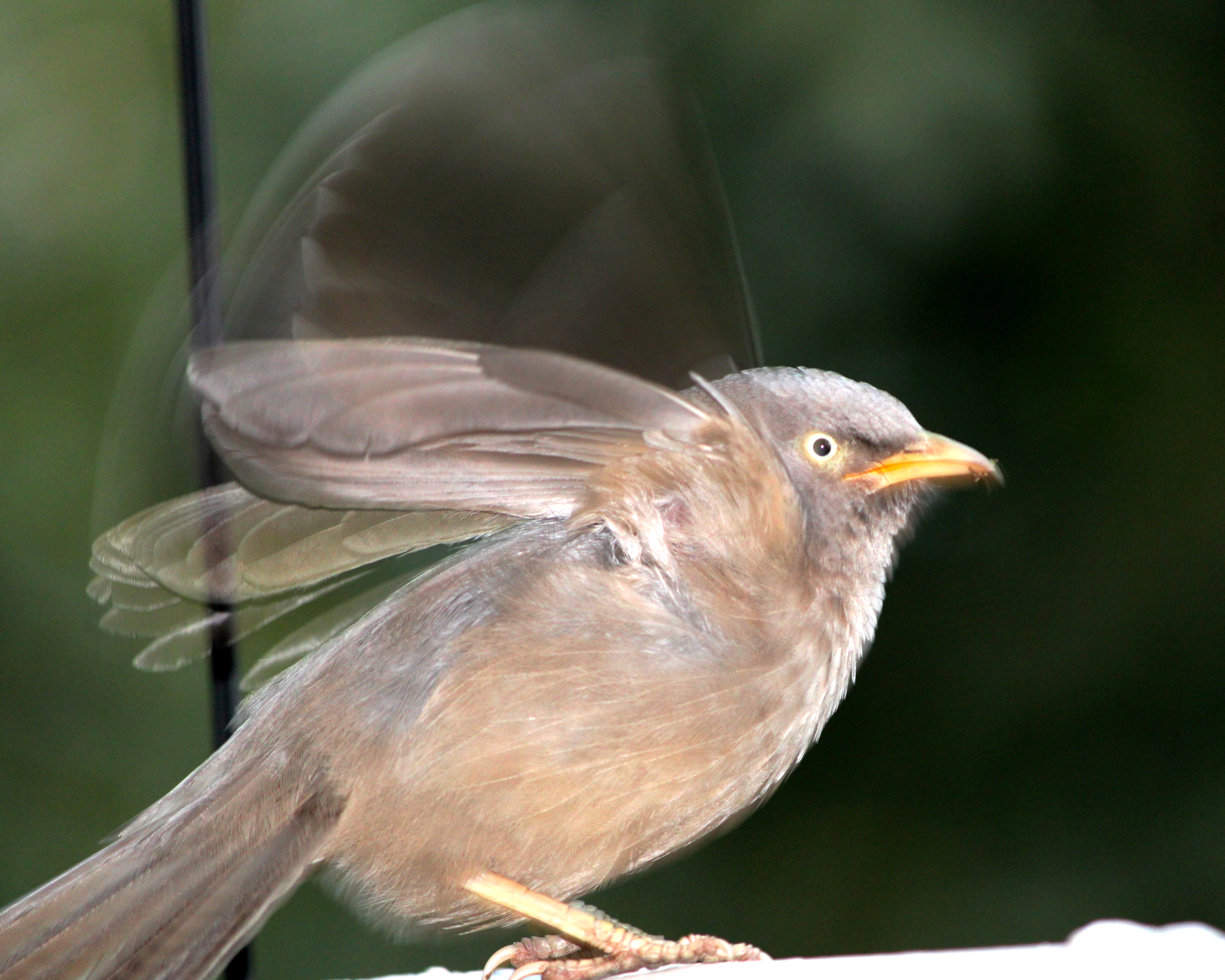
Jungle babbler

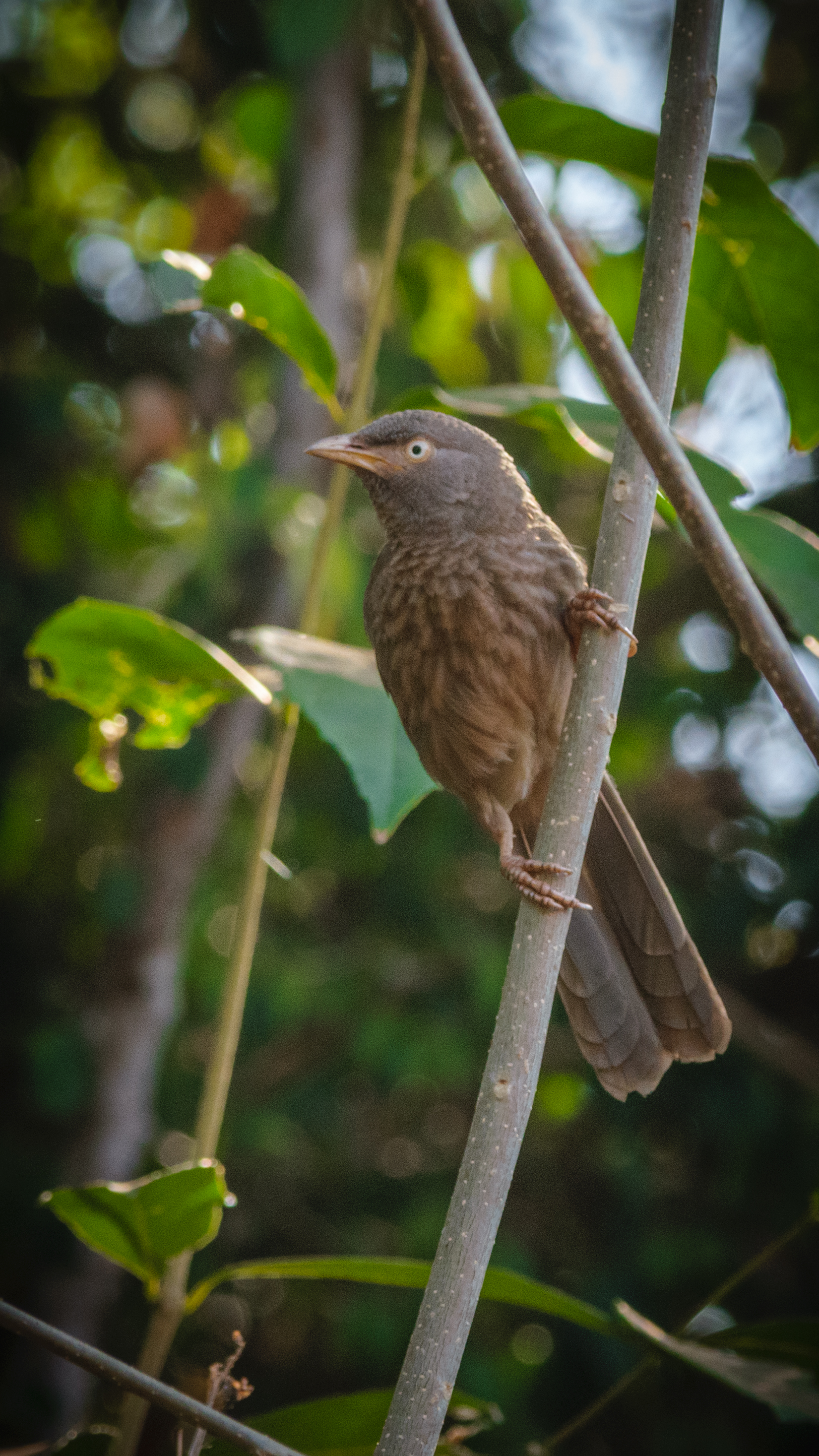
Subspecies malabarica

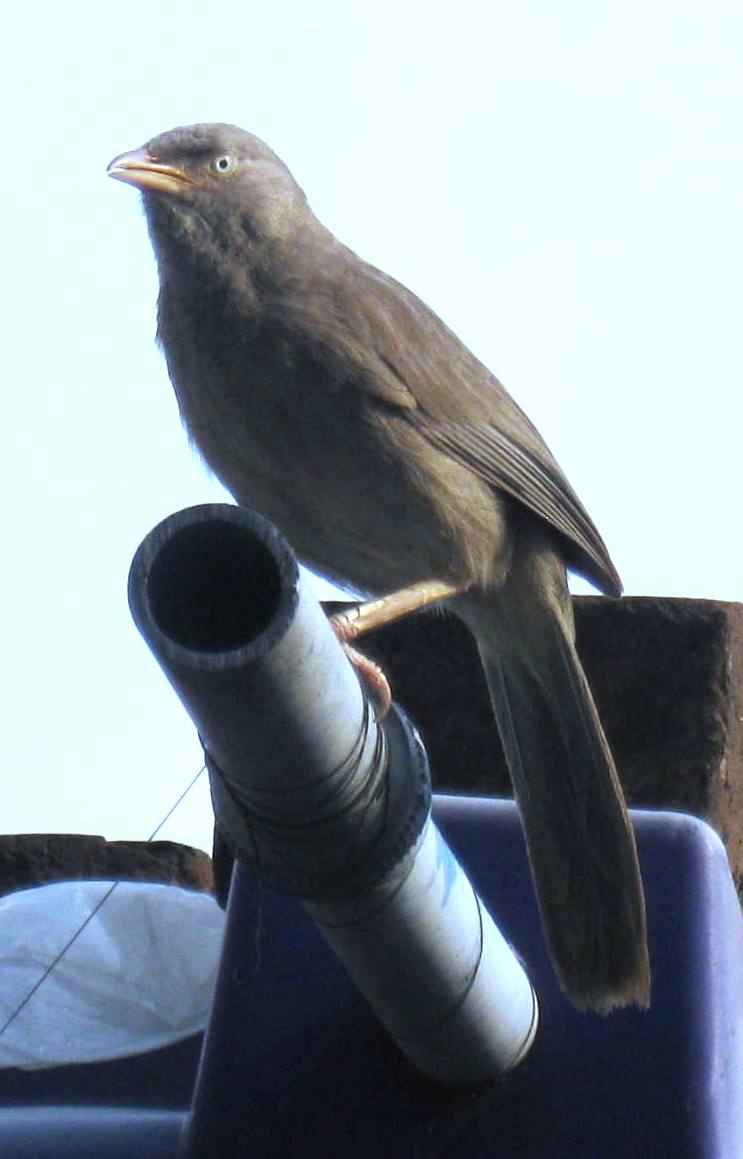
A jungle babbler, Kolkata, West Bengal, India

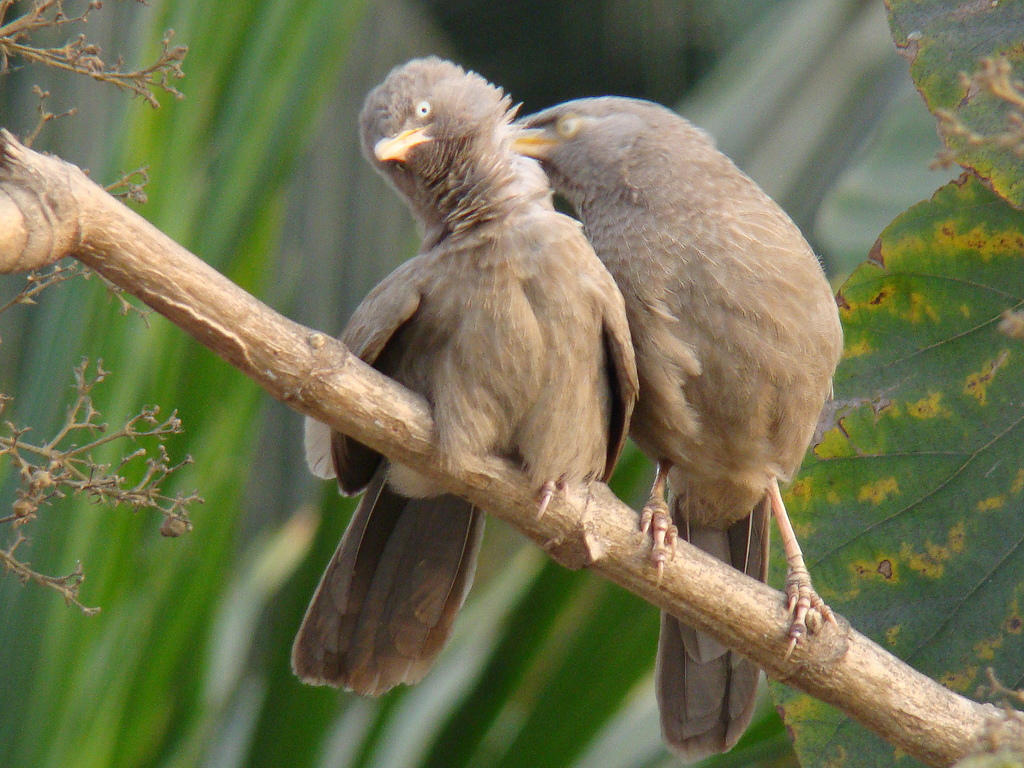
Nominate race from Kolkata allopreening
