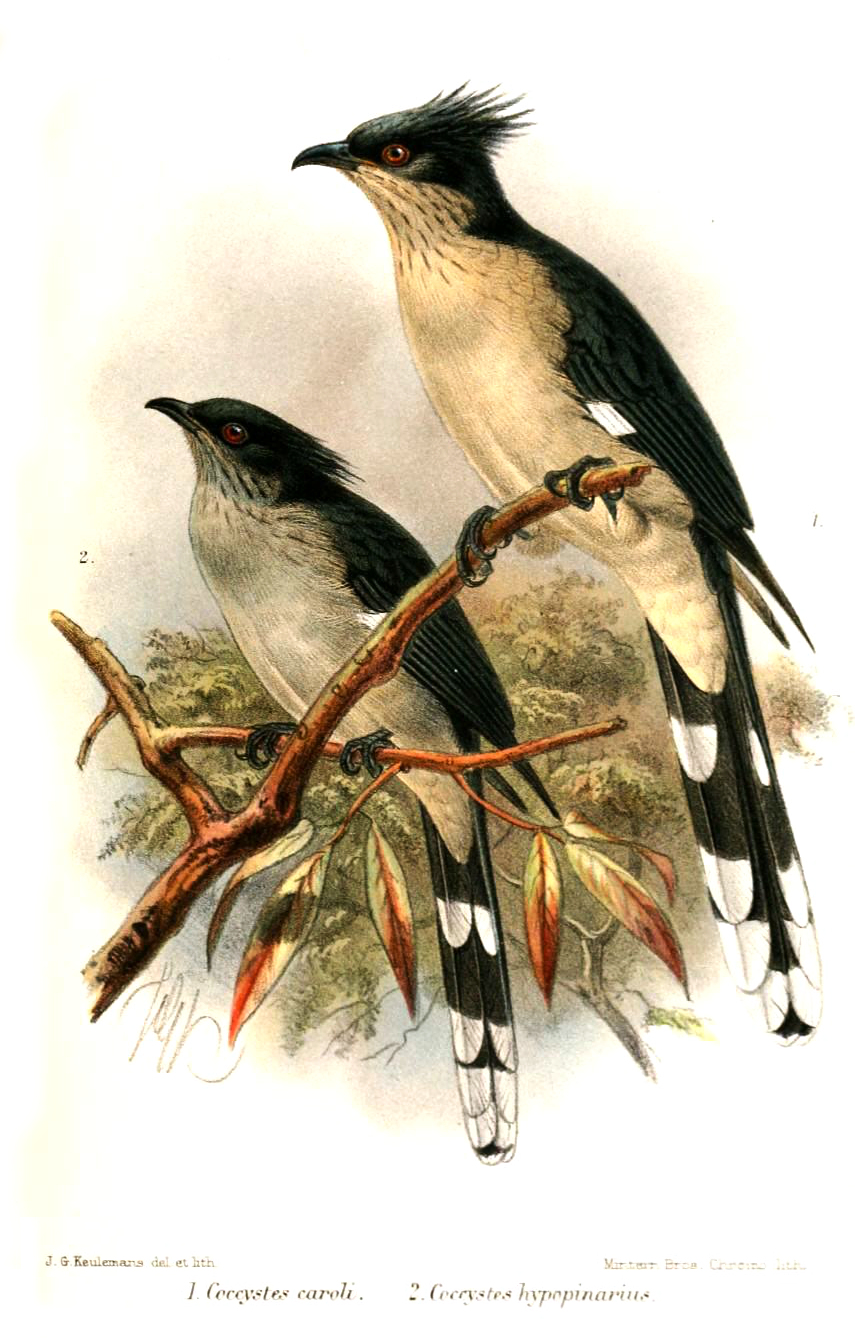
- Jacobin cuckoo, Clamator jacobinus (serratus on the left and pica to the right); Illustration by Keulemans, 1891

Scientific classification
- Kingdom: Animalia
- Phylum: Chordata
- Class: Aves
- Order: Cuculiformes
- Family: Cuculidae
- Genus: Clamator; Kaup, 1829

Type species
- Cuculus glandarius Linnaeus, 1758

Species
- C. glandarius C. jacobinus C. levaillantii C. coromandus

= Clamator =

Genus of birds

Clamator is a genus of large brood-parasitic cuckoos with crests and graduated tails.

The genus was erected by German naturalist Johann Jakob Kaup in 1829 with the great spotted cuckoo (Clamator glandarius) as the type species. The name Clamator is Latin for "he who shouts" from clamare, "to shout".

== Species ==
There are four species:

Genus Clamator – Kaup, 1829 – four species
Common name	Scientific name and subspecies	Range	Size and ecology	IUCN status and estimated population
Chestnut-winged cuckoo	Clamator coromandus (Linnaeus, 1766)	northern Indian subcontinent, China and Southeast Asia	Size: Habitat: Diet:	LC
Great spotted cuckoo	Clamator glandarius (Linnaeus, 1758)	Africa and the Mediterranean Basin	Size: Habitat: Diet:	LC
Levaillant's cuckoo	Clamator levaillantii (Swainson, 1829)	Sub-Saharan Africa	Size: Habitat: Diet:	LC
Jacobin cuckoo or pied cuckoo	Clamator jacobinus (Boddaert, 1783) Three subspecies: C. j. serratus (Sparrman, 1786); C. j. pica (Hemprich & Ehrenberg, 1833); C. j. jacobinus (Boddaert, 1783)	South Asia and Sub-Saharan Africa	Size: Habitat: Diet:	LC

== Distribution ==
Clamator cuckoos are found in warmer parts of southern Europe and Asia, and in Africa south of the Sahara Desert. These are birds of warm open scrubby habitats, but some species are at least partially migratory, leaving for warmer and wetter areas in winter.

These are large cuckoos, all at least 33 cm (13 in) long, with broad chestnut wings and long narrow tails. They are strikingly patterned with black, white and brown plumage. The sexes are similar but the juvenile plumages are distinctive. The two African species each also have two distinct colour morphs, light and dark.

All the Clamator cuckoos are brood parasites, which lay a single egg in the nests of medium-sized hosts, such as magpies, starlings, shrikes, laughingthrushes, bulbuls and babblers, depending on location. Unlike the common cuckoo, neither the hen nor the hatched chick of Clamator species evict the host's eggs, but the host's young often die because they cannot compete successfully with the cuckoo for food.

These are noisy birds, with persistent and loud calls. They feed on large insects, with hairy caterpillars, which are distasteful to many birds, being a specialty.
