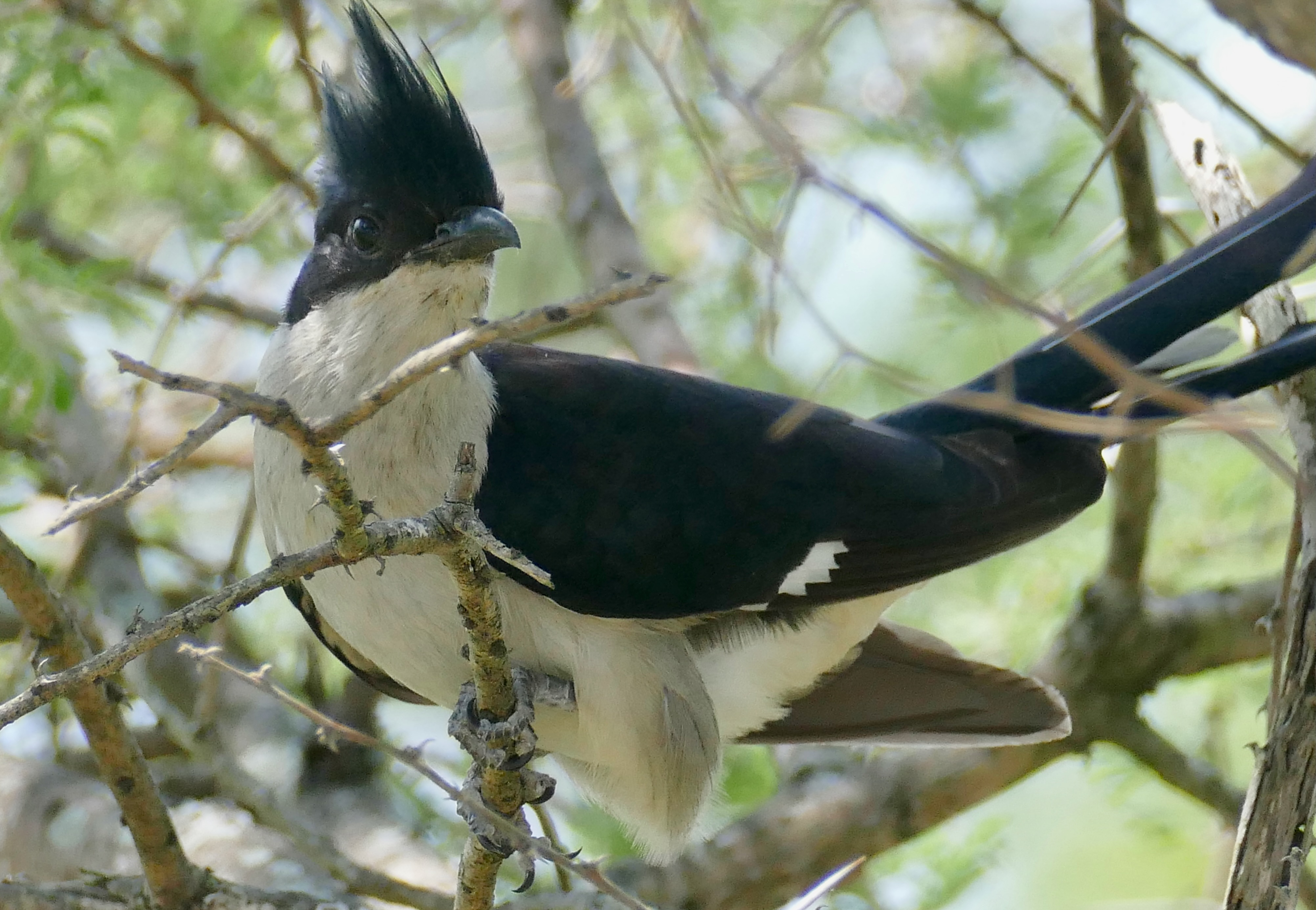
- An adult bird in South Africa

Conservation status
- Least Concern (IUCN 3.1)

Scientific classification
- Kingdom: Animalia
- Phylum: Chordata
- Class: Aves
- Order: Cuculiformes
- Family: Cuculidae
- Genus: Clamator
- Species: C. jacobinus

Binomial name
- Clamator jacobinus (Boddaert, 1783)
- dark green - year round yellow - summer only blue - winter cream - passage only

Synonyms
- Oxylophus jacobinus Coccystes melanoleucos Coccystes hypopinarius

= Jacobin cuckoo =

Species of bird

The Jacobin cuckoo (Clamator jacobinus), also pied cuckoo or pied crested cuckoo, is a member of the cuckoo order of birds that is found in Africa and Asia. It is partially migratory and in India, it has been considered a harbinger of the monsoon rains due to the timing of its arrival. It has been associated with a bird in Indian mythology and poetry, known as the chātaka (Sanskrit: चातक) represented as a bird with a beak on its head that waits for rains to quench its thirst.

== Taxonomy ==
The Jacobin cuckoo was described by the French polymath Georges-Louis Leclerc, Comte de Buffon in his Histoire Naturelle des Oiseaux in 1780. The bird was also illustrated in a hand-coloured plate engraved by François-Nicolas Martinet in the Planches Enluminées D'Histoire Naturelle. This was produced under the supervision of Edme-Louis Daubenton to accompany Buffon's text. Neither the plate caption nor Buffon's description included a scientific name but in 1783 the Dutch naturalist Pieter Boddaert coined the binomial name Cuculus jacobinus in his catalogue of the Planches Enluminées. The type locality is the Coromandel Coast of southeast India.

The current genus Clamator was erected by German naturalist Johann Jakob Kaup in 1829 with the great spotted cuckoo (Clamator glandarius) as the type species. The name is the Latin word for "shouter" from clamare, "to shout". The specific epithet jacobinus and the English name Jacobin refer to the pied plumage which resembles the black and white garments of monks belonging to the Dominican Order. In France Dominicans were known as "Jacobins".

The three subspecies with their breeding ranges are:

- C. j. serratus (Sparrman, 1786) – South Africa, southern Zambia
- C. j. pica (Hemprich & Ehrenberg, 1833) – Africa south of the Sahara to north Zambia and Malawi, northwest India to Nepal and Myanmar
- C. j. jacobinus (Boddaert, 1783) – south India, Sri Lanka, south Myanmar

== Description ==
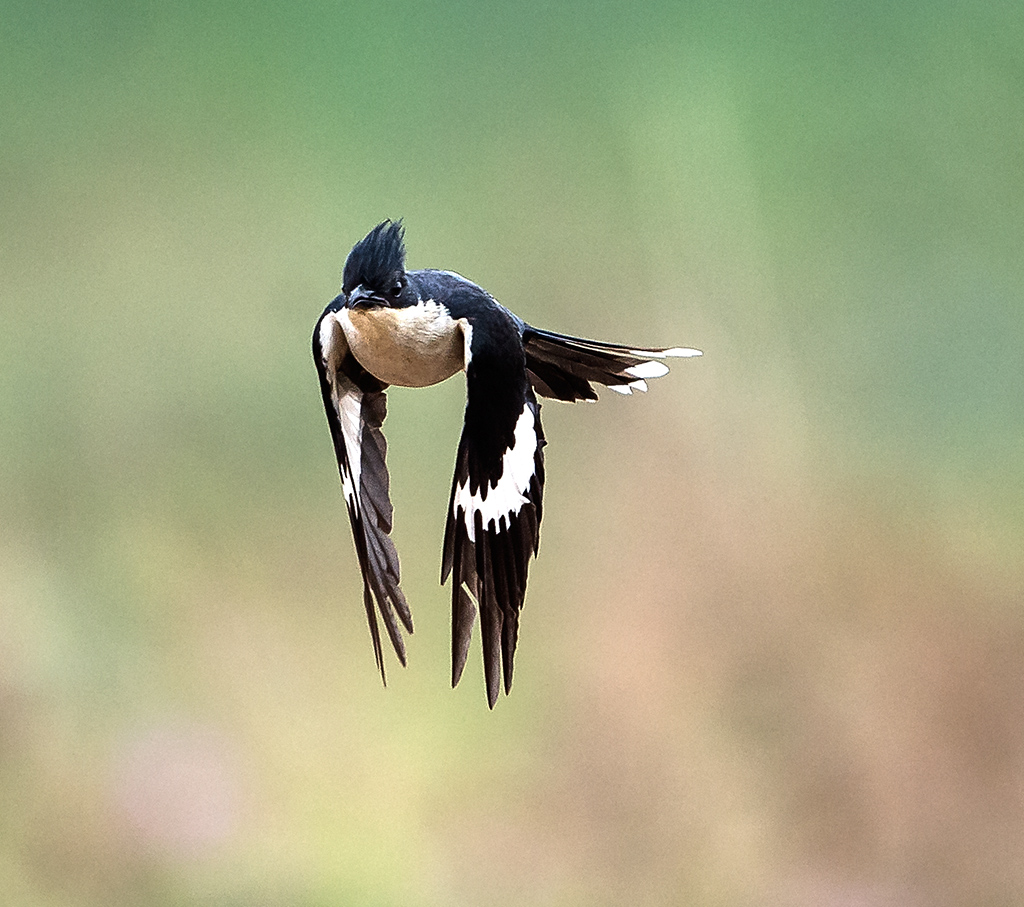
In flight, the white wing patches and tail edges are prominent

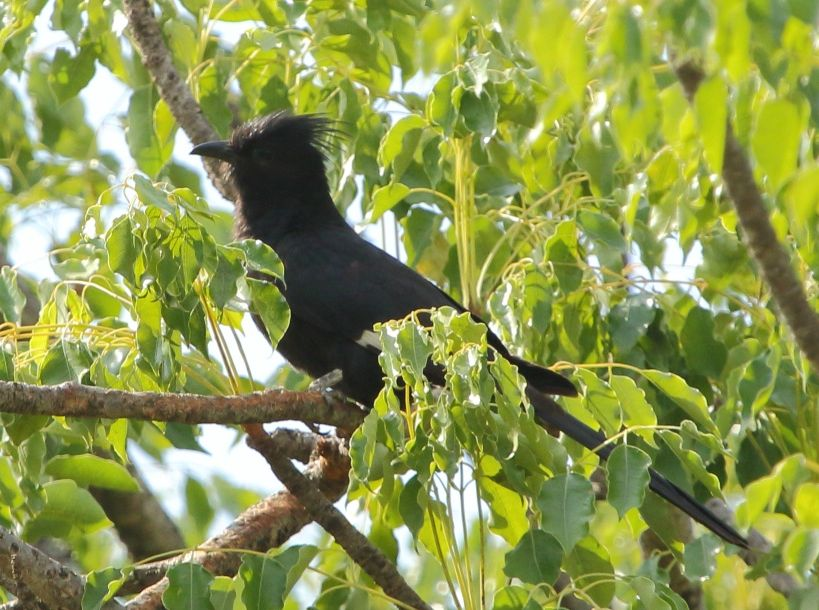
Black-phase Jacobin cuckoo in KwaZulu-Natal

This medium-sized, slim black and white cuckoo with a crest is distinctive. The white wing patch on the black wing and the pattern make it unmistakable even in flight. They are very vocal during the breeding season. The call is a ringing series of whistling notes "piu-piu" with the calls of the nominate form more rapid and slightly Mellower.

In India the subspecies serratus (Sparrman, 1786) is a summer breeding visitor to northern India and is believed to migrate to southern Africa. This is larger and longer winged than the nominate subspecies found in the southern peninsular region and Sri Lanka is said to be a local migrant. No ringing evidence exists to support the actual migration to Africa.

In Africa, subspecies serratus and pica (Hemprich & Ehrenberg, 1833) show two phases, a pied phase with white or whitish below and a black phase where the only white is on the wing patch. Mating appears to be assortative, with pied phase males pairing with pied phase females. An all-rufous color phase has been noted in Central Africa. There is lack of clarity on the migration and plumage variation involved. Subspecies pica has been said to be the form that migrates between Africa and India however Rasmussen & Anderton (2005) suggest serratus as being the valid name for the Afro-Indian migrants.

In the past some other African subspecies have been suggested such as hypopinarus from South Africa and caroli from the Gabon.

== Distribution and habitat ==
The species is distributed south of the Sahara in Africa and south of the Himalayas in India. Also found in Sri Lanka and parts of Myanmar. Within Africa, there are movements of the species although they are resident in tropical Africa. The east African population is migratory and moves over southern Arabia into India during April. The habitat of the species is mainly in thorny, dry scrub or open woodland avoiding areas of dense forest or extremely dry environments.

== Behaviour and ecology ==
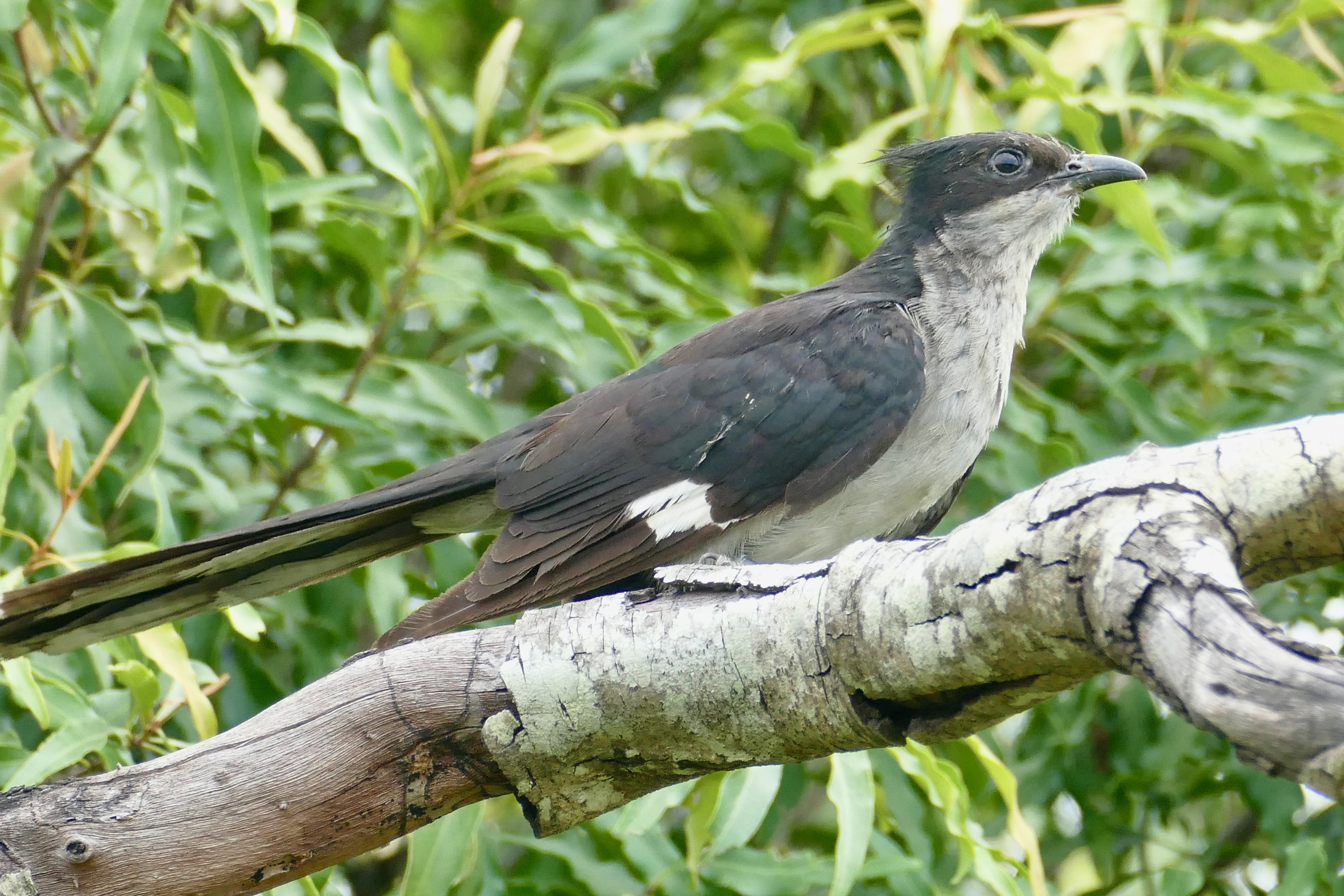
C. j. serratus is the largest race and an intra-African migrant. It has a grey tone to the underpart plumage, and variable streaking on the throat.

In the breeding season, birds call from prominent perches and chase each other with slow wing-beats and pigeon like clapping flight. Courtship feeding has been observed in Africa. The species is a brood parasite and in India the host is mainly species of babblers in the genus Turdoides. The colour of the eggs matches those of the host, typically turquoise blue. The eggs are slightly larger than those of the common babbler (T. caudatus) or the jungle babbler (T. striata). Other hosts include the red-vented bulbul, and the eggs laid are then mostly white. Eggs are laid hurriedly in the morning into the nest of the host often dropped from above while the bird perches on the rim of the nest and over the host eggs often resulting in the cracking of one or more host eggs. In Africa, the males distract the host while the female lays the egg. Multiple eggs may be laid in the nest of a host and two young cuckoos were found to fledge successfully in several occasions. In Africa, the hosts include Pycnonotus barbatus, P. capensis, Turdoides fulvus, Turdoides rubiginosus, Lanius collaris, Andropadus importunus, Terpsiphone viridis, Dicrurus adsimilis and a few other species. Babblers in the genus Turdoides are communal breeders and cuckoo chick are raised by several members of the group. A pied cuckoo chick was observed to be fed by four jungle babblers.

The skin of young birds darkens form pink to purplish brown within two days of hatching. The mouth linking is red with yellow gape flanges. Unlike some cuckoos, nestlings do not evict the eggs of the host from the nest although they claim most of the parental attention and food resulting sometimes, in the starvation of host nestlings.

These cuckoos feed on insects including hairy caterpillars that are picked up from near or on the ground. Caterpillars are pressed from end to end to remove the guts before they are swallowed. They sometimes feed on fruits.

Jacobin cuckoos are occasionally targeted as prey by the sparrowhawk (Accipiter nisus), which has been recorded attacking the significantly larger cuckoo by forcing it to the ground with its talons, then ripping away with its hooked beak.

== In culture ==
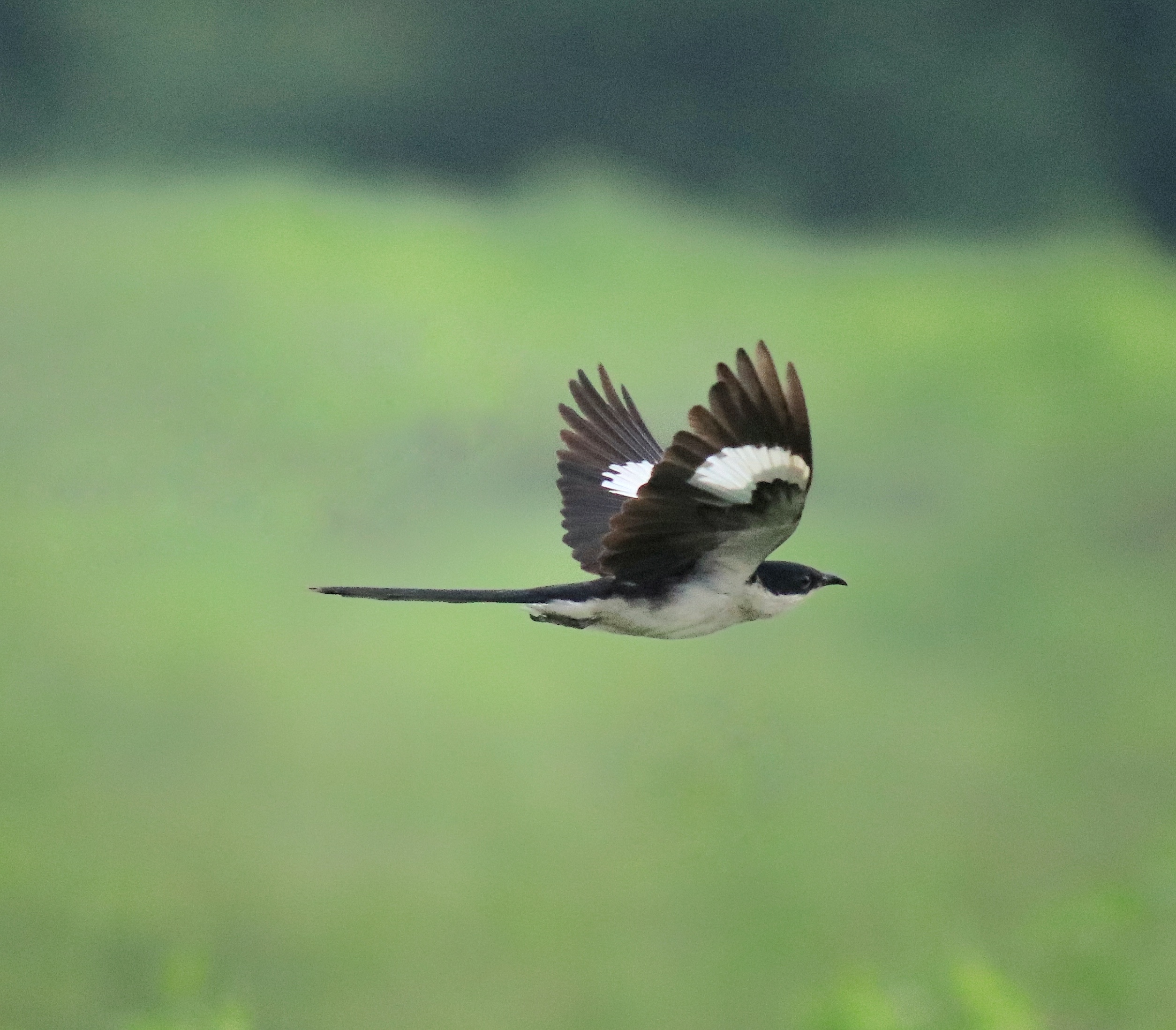
In Kerala, India

This species is widely mentioned in ancient Indian poetry as the chātaka. According to Indian mythology it has a beak atop its head and it thirsts for the rains. The poet Kalidasa used it in his "Meghadoota" as a metaphor for deep yearning and this tradition continues in literary works. Satya Churn Law, however noted that in Bengal, the bird associated with the "chataka" of Sanskrit was the common iora unlike the Jacobin cuckoo suggested by European orientalists. He further noted that a captive iora that he kept drank water only from dew and spray picked up from plant leaves suggesting that it may have been the basis for the idea that the "chatak" only drank raindrops. To compound the issues with matching vernacular names, it has been pointed out that in Bengal chātak also refers to skylarks (which are also crested). It is also mentioned in the poem 'Are ghaas ki roti' where it is said that if Maharana Pratap was to surrender to Akbar, a dystopian future will ensue where the chātak will drink water from the ground.

== Other sources ==
- Johnsingh AJT, Paramanandham K (1982). "Group care of white-headed babblers Turdoides affinis for a pied-crested cuckoo Clamator jacobinus chick". Ibis. 124 (2): 179–183. doi:10.1111/j.1474-919X.1982.tb03758.x.
- Ali Salim (1931). "Notes on the Pied Crested Cuckoo (Clamator jacobinus) in Alibag Taluk (Kolaba District)". J. Bombay Nat. Hist. Soc. 34 (4): 1071–1072.
- Jamdar Nitin (1987). "Occurrence of Pied Crested Cuckoo (Clamator jacobinus) in Suru Valley, Ladakh". J. Bombay Nat. Hist. Soc. 84 (1): 208–209.
- Liversidge R (1971). "The biology of the Jacobin Cuckoo Clamator jacobinus". Ostrich. 40 (sup1): 117–37. doi:10.1080/00306525.1969.9639115.
- Liversidge R (1961). "Pre-incubation development of Clamator jacobinus". Ibis. 103a (4): 624. doi:10.1111/j.1474-919x.1961.tb02466.x.
