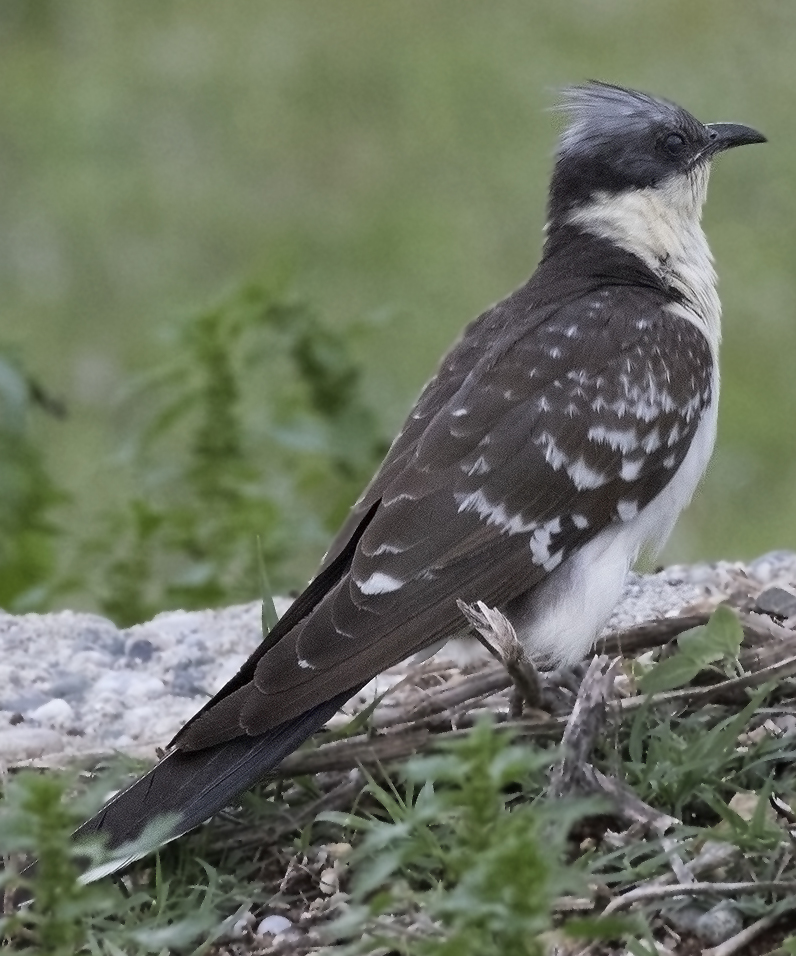

Conservation status
- Least Concern (IUCN 3.1)

Scientific classification
- Kingdom: Animalia
- Phylum: Chordata
- Class: Aves
- Order: Cuculiformes
- Family: Cuculidae
- Genus: Clamator
- Species: C. glandarius

Binomial name
- Clamator glandarius (Linnaeus, 1758)
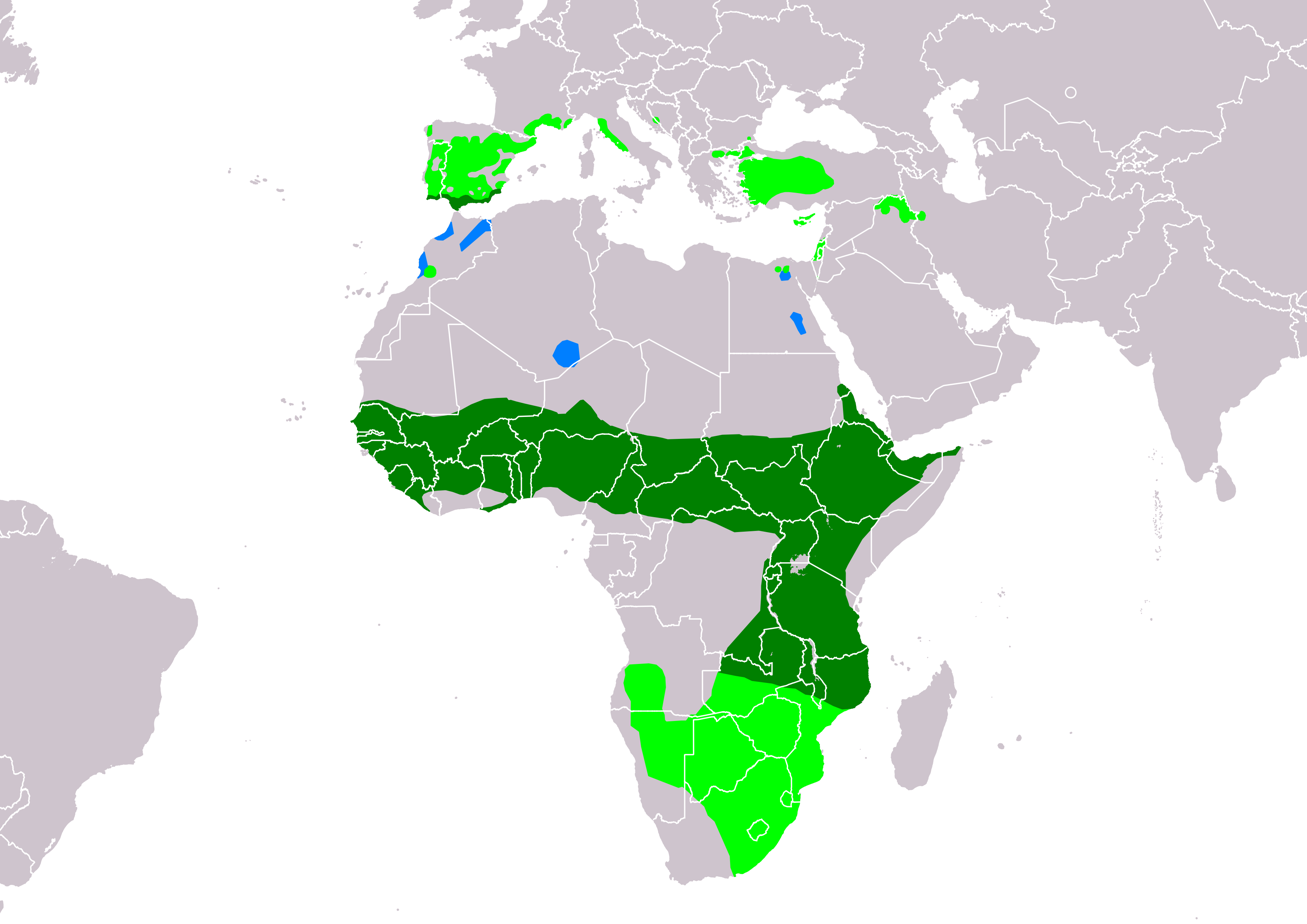
- Range of C. glandarius Breeding Resident Non-breeding

Synonyms
- Cuculus glandarius Linnaeus, 1758

Audio
- Great spotted cuckoo call (Clamator glandarius) in León, Spain

= Great spotted cuckoo =

Species of bird

The great spotted cuckoo (Clamator glandarius) is a member of the cuckoo order of birds, the Cuculiformes, which also includes the roadrunners, the anis and the coucals.

It is widely spread throughout Africa and the Mediterranean Basin. It is a brood parasite that lays its eggs in the nests of corvids, in particular the Eurasian magpie.

== Taxonomy ==
In 1747 the English naturalist George Edwards included an illustration and a description of the great spotted cuckoo in the second volume of his A Natural History of Uncommon Birds. He used the English name "The Great Spotted Cuckow". Edwards based his hand-coloured etching on a specimen that had been shot in Gibraltar and sent to the English naturalist Mark Catesby in London. When in 1758 the Swedish naturalist Carl Linnaeus updated his Systema Naturae for the tenth edition, he placed the great spotted cuckoo with the other cuckoos in the genus Cuculus. Linnaeus included a brief description, coined the binomial name Cuculus glandarius and cited Edwards's work. The great spotted cuckoo is now placed in the genus Clamator that was introduced by German naturalist Johann Jakob Kaup in 1829. The species is monotypic: no subspecies are recognised. The genus name Clamator is Latin for "shouter" from clamare, "to shout". The specific epithet glandarius is Latin meaning "of acorns".

== Description ==
This species is slightly larger than the common cuckoo at 35–39 cm (14–15 in) in length, but looks much larger with its broad wings and long narrow tail. The adult is grey above with a slender body, long tail and strong legs. It has a grey cap, grey wings, a yellowish face and upper breast, and white underparts. Sexes are similar. The juveniles have blackish upperparts and cap, and chestnut primary wing feathers. This species has a magpie-like flight.

It is a bird of warm open country with trees. It feeds on insects, spiders, small reptiles and hairy caterpillars, which are distasteful to many birds.

The great spotted cuckoo's call is a loud cher-cher-kri-kri and variations.

== Behaviour ==
=== Breeding ===
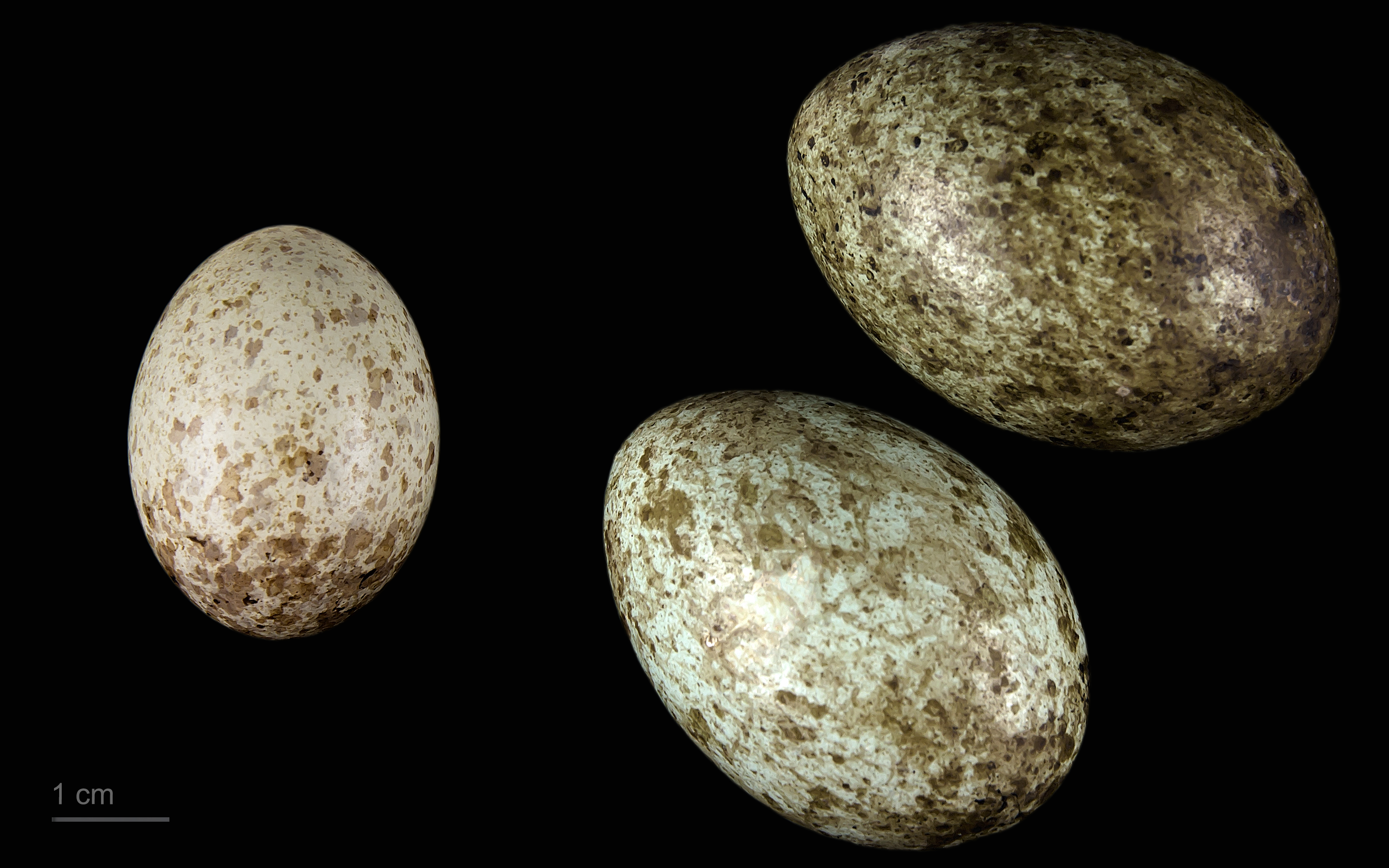
Clamator glandarius in a clutch of Corvus cornix - MHNT

Unlike the common cuckoo, neither the hen nor the hatched chick of this species evict the host's eggs, but the young magpies often die because they cannot compete successfully with the cuckoo for food. However it has been shown that this species' chicks secrete a repellent scent when predators threaten. The repellent protects great spotted cuckoo chicks themselves as well as the host's chicks from predators. Carrion crow (Corvus corone corone) chicks survive better if a great spotted cuckoo chick shares their nest. Birds of prey and feral cats less frequently prey on crow's nests that include a great spotted cuckoo chick. Crow chicks benefit only when predators are very active; when there is less predation, losing food to great spotted cuckoo chicks harms the crow chicks without compensation.
