= Saratchandra Mitra =

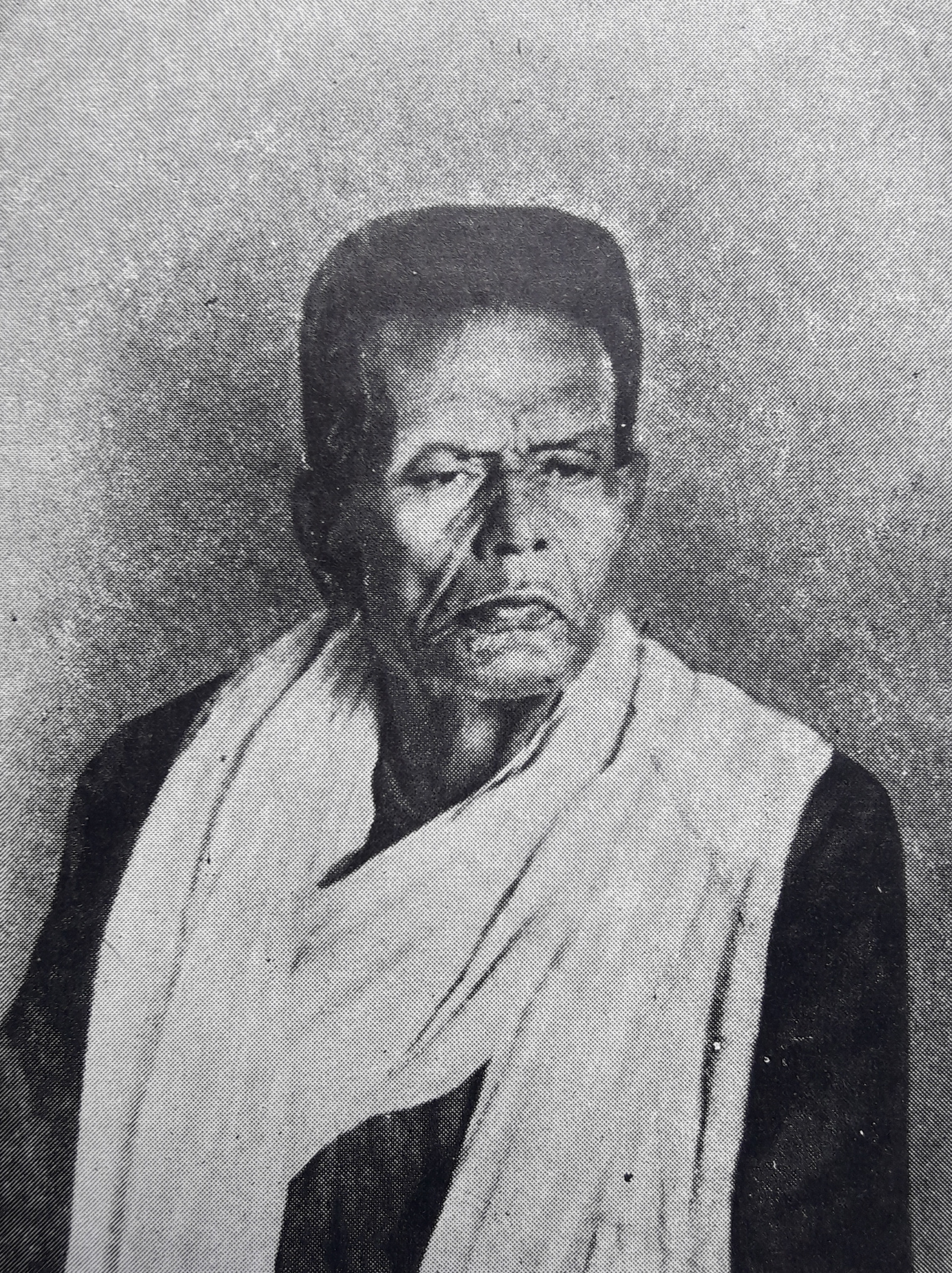

Saratchandra Mitra (Sarat Chandra Mitra in his English writings, sometimes as Çarat Candra Mitra) (15 November 1863 – 15 December 1938) was a Bengali folklorist and scholar who studied and wrote extensively on plants and animals in Indian lore. Although trained in legal practice, he was appointed in later life as the founding head and professor of the department of anthropology at the University of Calcutta.

== Biography ==
Saratchandra came from a family with origins in Hogulkuria in Sutaniti Taluk where his ancestor Rammohan Mitra had moved to after leaving his original home at Borisha due to raids made by the Mahrattas. Saratchandra's father was Narasinghachandra Mitra, a legal adviser and pleader to the Hathwa Raj, and his mother was Nistarini Dasi. Saratchandra's older brother Amulyachandra died young and sister Sailabala Dasi was married to Purnachandra Chaudhuri of Simla.

Saratchandra studied at the Calcutta Training Academy School at Chapra during 1875, followed by studies with scholarships at the Metropolitan Institution founded by Ishwarchand Vidyasagar before passing the Entrance Examination of 1880 from the City School at Calcutta in the first division. He received a BA with honours in English in 1885 from the Metropolitan Institution with scholarships followed by an MA in English in 1886 and a BL in 1888. He joined the Chapra Bar in May 1889 and was guided by his father. He continued to work with the Bar until 1894 although he attempted to move into Judicial services as a Gazetted officer. From February 1894 to March 1903 he worked as a Superintendent of Survey and Settlement in the Huthwa Raj. The Court of Wards was however abolished and he returned to the Chapra Bar (Saratchandra's father had worked here and died on 11 July 1905) in 1904 and worked till November 1911. From 1911 he worked as an assistant manager, appointed by the Maharani of Hathua. In 1921 he was appointed professor in charge of the newly created Department of Anthropology at the University of Calcutta but he retired in 1926 due to ill health and loss of vision. His position was then briefly taken by the American trained Biraja Sankar Guha who however moved out of the university to join government service.

== Writings ==
Saratchandra's interests were in travel, history, folklore, biography, and anthropology. He was influenced by the Ethnographic Survey of India which had begun in 1905 under Herbert Risley as well as the Linguistic Survey of India by George Grierson. He wrote on a range of subjects such as The Legends of Buddha in Indo-Hellenistic Art (In a Bombay-based magazine East and West, August 1913) which was reviewed by the Evening Gazette of Aberdeen. During his postings and travels in North Bihar he collected information from the local people. He was a prolific writer and published nearly 183 papers in the Journal of the Anthropological Society of Bombay, 97 in the Quarterly Journal of the Mythic Society, 37 in the National Magazine, Calcutta, 34 in Man-in-India (Ranchi), 21 each in the Journal of the Asiatic Society of Bengal and the Hindustan Review and many more in university journals. He also wrote under a pseudonym "Aescyem" (for his initials) to the Calcutta Review. He was a corresponding member of the Anthropological Society of Bombay from 1895. In 1912 the Society decided to reprint Mitra's collected writings as a book.

Mitra noted a lack of interest in natural history among Indians in India and was an early promoter of outdoor natural history education in schools.

Among the topics that Mitra explored where folk rhymes, drolls, tales, riddles, and beliefs. He took a particular interest in myth and lore around plants and animals and recorded a range of didactic and aetiological myths.

== Personal life ==
Saratchandra married Sarasibala Ray, daughter of the Subordinate Judge of Gaya district, Dineshchandra Ray. They had three sons.
