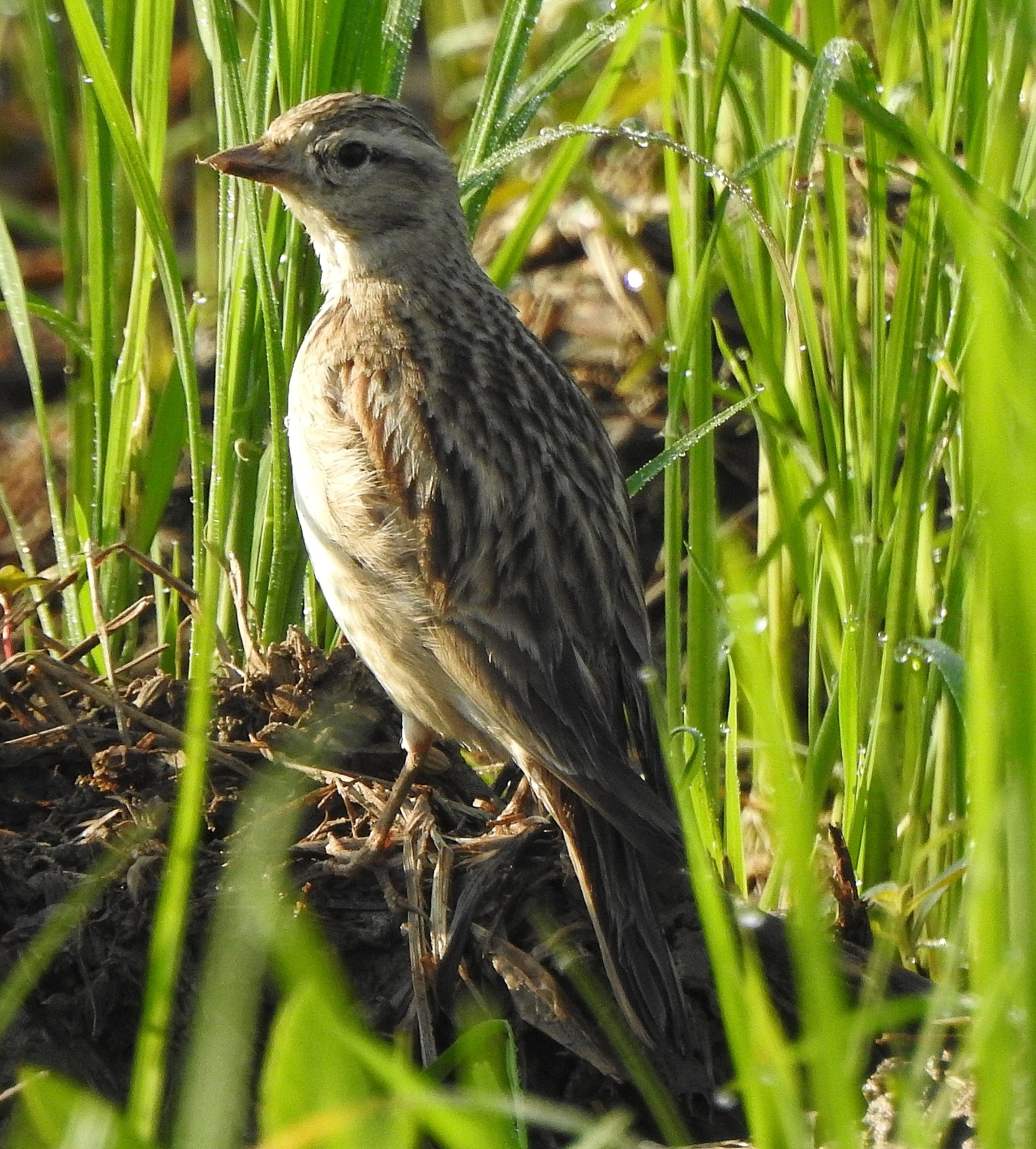

Conservation status
- Least Concern (IUCN 3.1)

Scientific classification
- Kingdom: Animalia
- Phylum: Chordata
- Class: Aves
- Order: Passeriformes
- Family: Alaudidae
- Genus: Calandrella
- Species: C. dukhunensis

Binomial name
- Calandrella dukhunensis (Sykes, 1832)

Synonyms
- Alauda Dukhunensis; Calandrella brachydactyla dukhunensis; Calandrella cinerea dukhunensis

= Mongolian short-toed lark =

Species of bird

The Mongolian short-toed lark or Sykes's short-toed lark (Calandrella dukhunensis) is a species of lark in the family Alaudidae. It breeds in China and Mongolia and winters in southern Asia.

== Taxonomy and systematics ==
The Mongolian short-toed lark was originally placed in the genus Alauda. It was then considered as a subspecies of the morphologically similar greater short-toed lark, but recent analyses of both mitochondrial and nuclear DNA showed that it was more closely related to Hume's short-toed lark. It was split in 2016 by the IOC, although not all other authorities have recognized this re-classification to date. Additionally, some authorities considered the Mongolian short-toed lark to be a subspecies of the red-capped lark. The name 'Mongolian short-toed lark' is also used as an alternate name for the Asian short-toed lark. The alternate name short-toed lark may also be used for three other species in the genus Calandrella.

== Description ==
The Mongolian short-toed lark is darker and has a shorter bill than the greater short-toed lark. The Mongolian short-toed lark breeds on the Tibetan Plateau and winters mainly in peninsular India.
