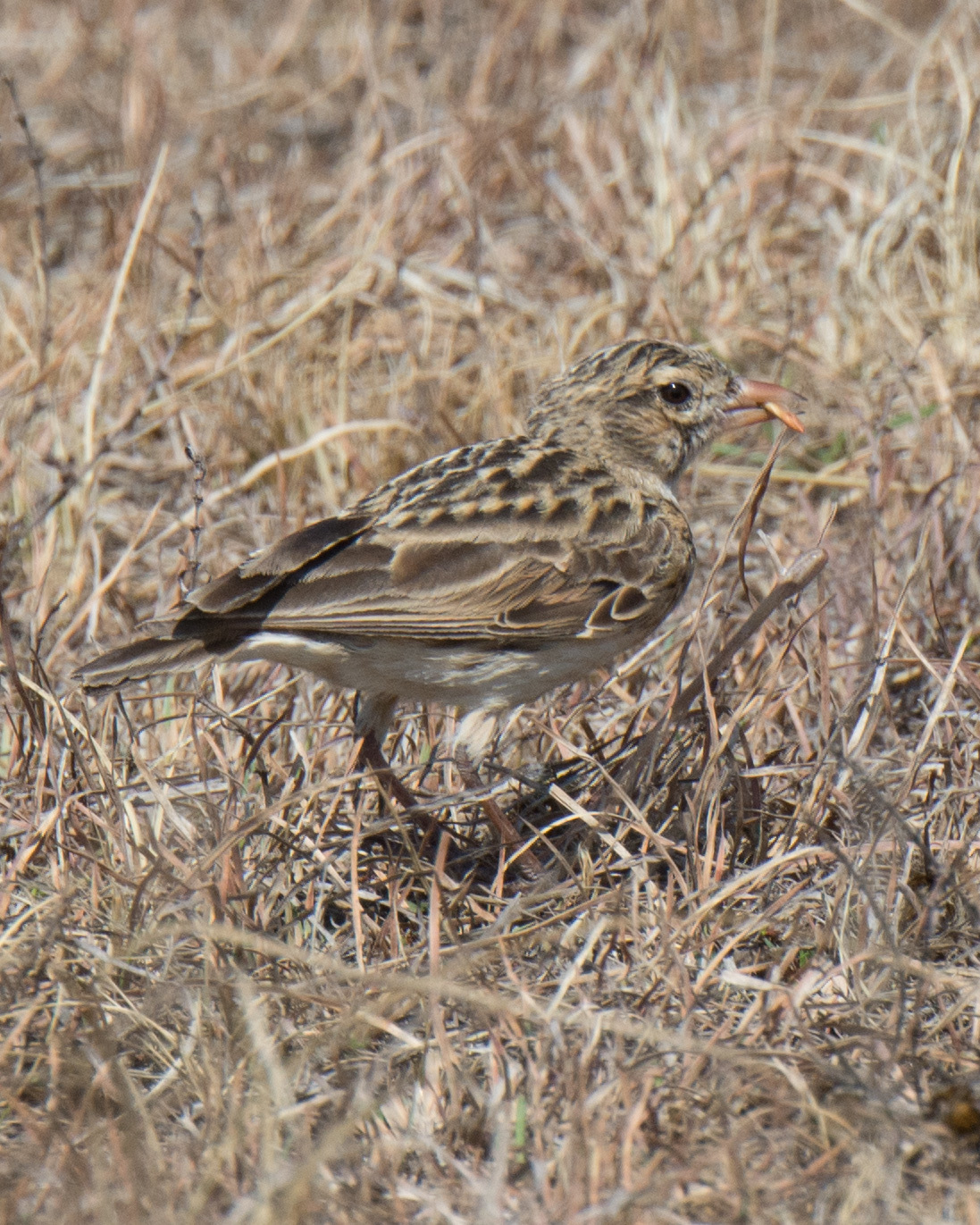

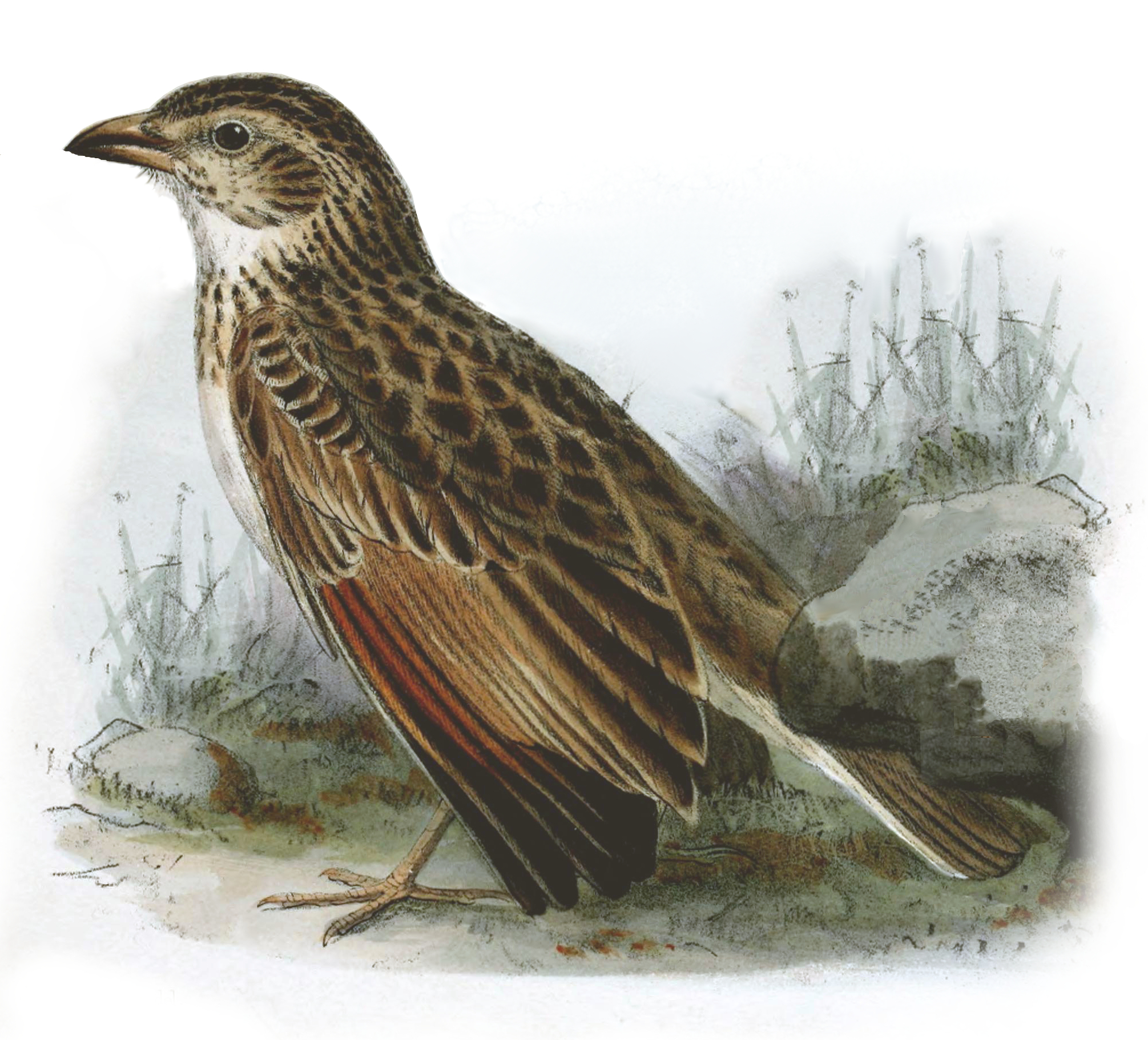

Conservation status
- Endangered (IUCN 3.1)

Scientific classification
- Kingdom: Animalia
- Phylum: Chordata
- Class: Aves
- Order: Passeriformes
- Family: Alaudidae
- Genus: Spizocorys
- Species: S. fringillaris

Binomial name
- Spizocorys fringillaris (Sundevall, 1850)
- IUCN range Extant (resident)
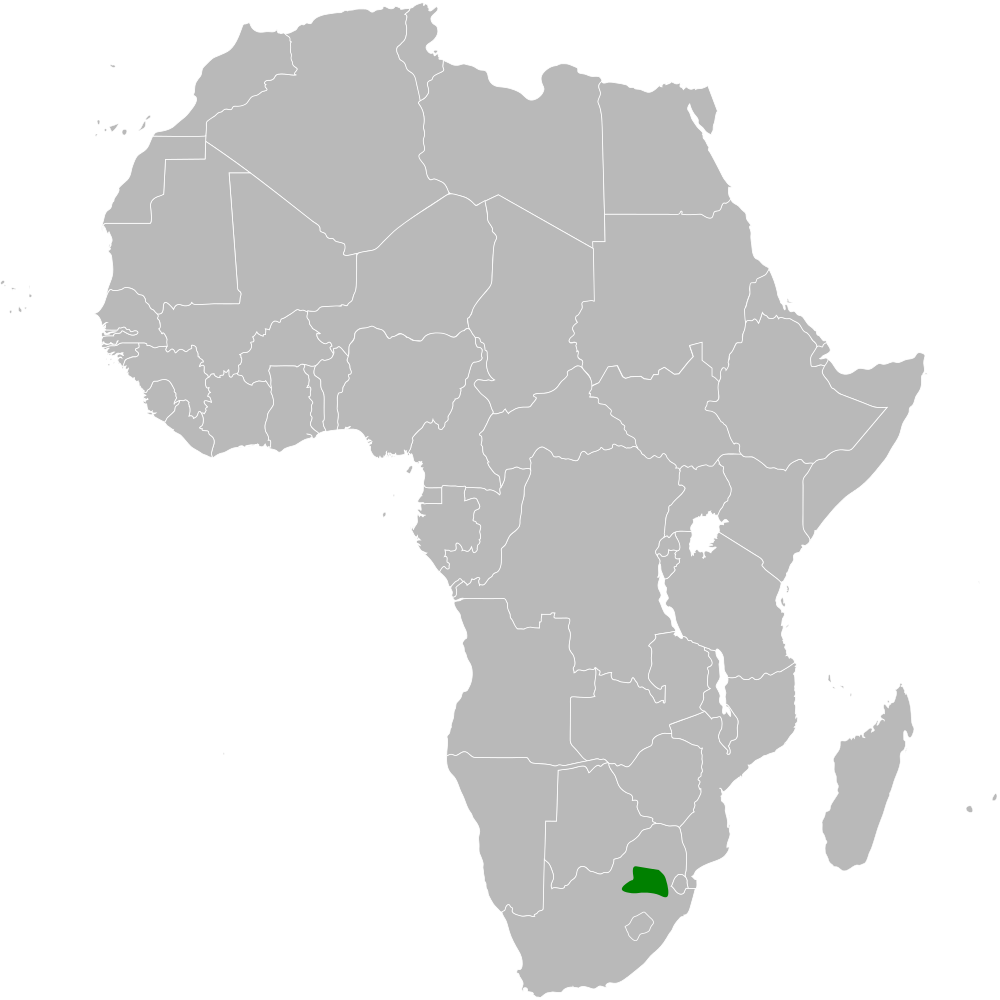

Synonyms
- Alauda fringillaris; Botha difficilis; Botha fringillaris; Calandrella fringillaris; Spizocorys difficilis

= Botha's lark =

Species of bird

Botha's lark (Spizocorys fringillaris) is a species of lark in the family Alaudidae that is endemic to South Africa. It is considered to be South Africa's most endangered bird species with approximately 340 mature individuals left in the wild. Over the last decade, there has been a 90% population decline resulting in the species regionally being uplisted to Critically Endangered in the 2025 Regional Red Data Book of Birds of South Africa, Lesotho and Eswatini.

== Description ==
This is a small, compact lark, exhibiting a boldly marked face with a pinkish, conical bill. It has grey-brown upperparts, contrasting with pale underparts and a streaked, buffy chest. This lark also exhibits spread out streaking on its flanks, which helps differentiate it from the similar pink-billed lark (Spizocorys conirostris) which has plain, white flanks. Its call is short and simple and can be given in flight or whilst on the ground.

== Taxonomy and systematics ==
Botha's lark was described by Swedish zoologist Carl Jakob Sundevall in 1850. The species was originally placed in the genus Alauda. Formerly, some authorities have classified it within either the genus Calandrella or the monotypic genus Botha. An alternate species name of difficilis has also been used to describe Botha's lark. Recent genetic studies have shown that it is closely related to pink-billed lark (Spizocorys conirostris), supporting its classification within the Spizocorys genus.

== Distribution ==
Botha's lark is a grassland specialist endemic to the high-altitude grasslands of South Africa, restricted to southern Mpumalanga, eastern Free State and potentially KwaZulu-Natal. The species distribution extends from its southern limit in the Harrismith and Verkykerskop districts of the eastern Free State, through its core stronghold in the southern Mpumalanga, including the Volksrust, Wakkerstroom, and Daggakraal districts, and extending northwards to the Hendrina, Kriel, and Secunda regions of central Mpumalanga.

Evidence suggests significant local extinctions across parts of its historical range. Notably, the type specimen was collected near Vredefort in the northern Free State - a locality now well outside the species' known distribution. Likely driven by large-scale habitat loss, transformation, and fragmentation associated with agriculture and infrastructure development.

=== Population ===
In 1983, the global population of Botha's lark was estimated to be as many as 20,000 individuals. This was later revised to a more conservative range of 1,500–5,000 individuals in 2000. By 2015, the global population was thought to number fewer than 2,500 individuals. The most recent estimates place the global population at approximately 340 individuals, with a confidence interval of 200–600 birds, highlighting the species' precarious conservation status and steep long-term decline. In May 2025, the Botha's lark was regionally uplisted to critically endangered, while globally the species is considered to be endangered by the IUCN Red List.

== Habitat and ecology ==
Botha's lark is closely associated with heavily grazed, high-altitude grasslands on dark clay soils, particularly within the Moist Clay Highveld Grassland vegetation type. It typically inhabits short upland grasslands at elevations between 1,500 and 1,900 meters above sea level, preferring flat or gently sloping plateaus and hilltops with short, dense, and well-grazed natural grass. Its range is limited to southeastern Mpumalanga and adjacent areas of the eastern Free State.

This restricted distribution is largely due to the species' highly specific habitat requirements for both breeding and foraging, coupled with the widespread transformation and degradation of natural grasslands. These habitats, often maintained through intensive cattle grazing, are essential for the species, which relies on short grass but frequently nests in recently burned areas.

The species tends to favour fallow land and heavily grazed, seasonally burned, and trampled patches in low-lying areas. The species is nomadic and makes local movements in response to changing resource availability and habitat conditions.

== Diet ==
Botha's lark feeds on a combination of seeds and insects, including beetles and moths, although its diet has not been extensively studied. Limited knowledge of its dietary requirements may contribute to uncertainty around factors influencing its distribution. The diet of the chicks were found to be exclusively insect-based. Grasshoppers comprised the majority of the food brought back to the nest.

== Breeding ==
Botha's lark begins breeding with the first seasonal rains, typically from October to January. Due to low nest survival rates, the species relies on multiple nesting attempts per season, requiring a prolonged breeding period. Crude breeding success has been recorded at 53% (n = 8), though recent research suggests it may be lower. Like other Spizocorys larks, it is likely monogamous, with a generation length of 2.9 years. During breeding, pairs form and may nest in close proximity, with densities of up to six pairs per hectare and nests less than 20 m apart. Preferred nesting sites feature slightly taller grass, scattered tufts, bare patches, and sometimes recently burnt areas. The open cup nest is built in about three days from dry grass, lined with finer materials, and typically holds two eggs laid a day apart (occasionally three). Nests are constructed and dried cow or sheep dung are placed around the nest after completion. Egg dimensions are 17.2-19.6 mm × 13.5-14.2 mm. Incubation lasts 13–14 days and is shared by both parents in short shifts. Chicks are brooded and fed by both adults, with some being fed up to 11 times in 30 minutes. While adults usually forage within 50 m of the nest, they may travel over 200 m for food.

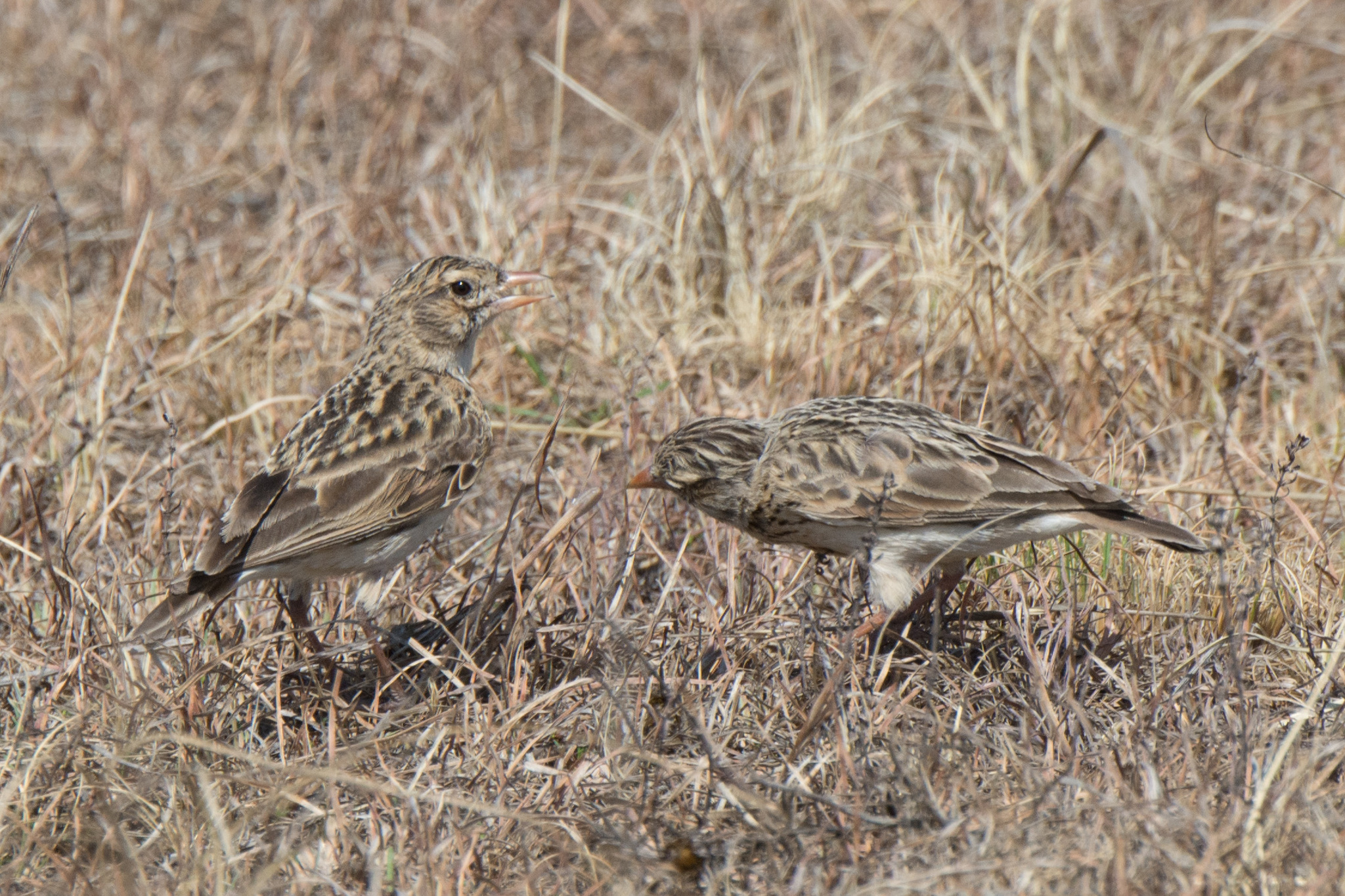
A pair of Botha's larks foraging

== Threats ==
Botha's lark has lost the bulk of its original habitat, but the species can thrive on farmland if managed correctly, with for example the right cattle grazing regimes. This species faces a range of threats, with habitat loss, degradation, and fragmentation being the most significant. Agricultural expansion—particularly cropland development and unfavourable pasture management—continues to transform and reduce the extent of suitable high-altitude grasslands. While the species favours heavily grazed areas, shifts in livestock type (e.g., from sheep to cattle) or changes in grazing intensity can alter grass structure to the point of making habitats unsuitable. Approximately 30% of its highland grassland habitat has already been lost, and up to 60% of remaining habitat is degraded due to inappropriate management.

Fire regimes also play a critical role. Frequent or poorly timed burning—especially late-season fires—can shorten the breeding window and increase nest predation. Nest success is higher in areas burned early in the breeding season, whereas extensive or repeated fires may lead to population declines and nest destruction.

Fragmentation is compounding these threats, resulting in small, isolated subpopulations with limited connectivity. Although previously considered to be at low risk from climate change, recent modelling suggests Botha's lark could experience significant range contractions over the next two decades, especially along the southern, northern, and western edges of its distribution.

Additional threats include human population expansion, urbanisation, and mining. While afforestation poses a lower risk than once believed, it may still displace the species in marginal areas, particularly along the Mpumalanga escarpment. Given its limited range, low population density, and specialised habitat requirements, the loss of even a single subpopulation could have long-term consequences for the species' survival.

== Conservation ==
BirdLife South Africa, in collaboration with Birding Ecotours, has developed a comprehensive Botha's Lark Species Action Plan aimed at halting population declines and securing the species' long-term survival. The organisation has been conducting scientific monitoring and research, including population, habitat surveys and habitat modelling to improve understanding of the species' distribution, abundance, breeding success, and ecological requirements.

Less than 1% of the population of Botha's lark were in protected areas. Active engagement with private landowners, particularly around Wakkerstroom, supports the establishment of formal protected environments—such as Mabola Protected Environment—and promotes grassland management practices tailored to the needs of Botha's lark. BirdLife South Africa also facilitates stakeholder workshops that bring together conservation scientists, land managers, and local communities to refine habitat management strategies.

Environmental education initiatives in communities and schools, particularly in areas like Daggakraal, raise awareness and encourage local participation in conservation efforts. Additionally, public outreach and advocacy campaigns, in partnership with ecotourism operators and other stakeholders, aim to promote sustainable agricultural practices and appropriate fire management regimes that maintain optimal grassland conditions. These integrated efforts combine research, stewardship, education, and policy advocacy to reverse population declines and stabilise fragmented subpopulations of this critically endangered species.

The implementation conservation measures would not only preserve Botha's lark, but also numerous other threatened species with overlapping distributions, including grey crowned crane (Balearica regulorum), blue crane (Anthropoides paradiseus), Cape vulture (Gyps coprotheres), southern bald ibis (Geronticus calvus), Rudd's lark (Heteromirafra ruddi), yellow-breasted pipit (Hemimacronyx chloris) and sungazers (Smaug giganteus).
