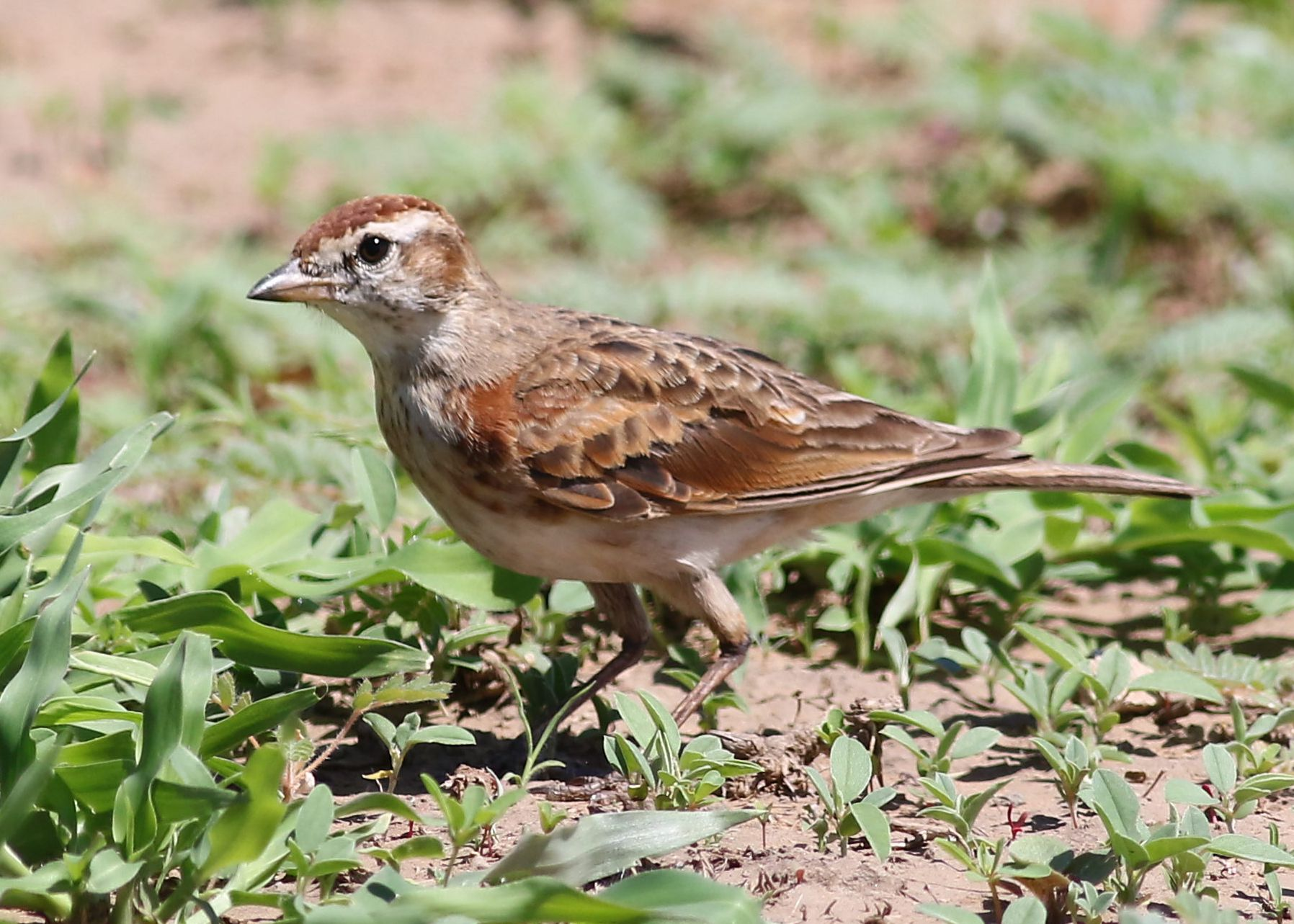
- Nominate race at Mapungubwe, South Africa

Conservation status
- Least Concern (IUCN 3.1)

Scientific classification
- Kingdom: Animalia
- Phylum: Chordata
- Class: Aves
- Order: Passeriformes
- Family: Alaudidae
- Genus: Calandrella
- Species: C. cinerea

Binomial name
- Calandrella cinerea (Gmelin, JF, 1789)

Subspecies
- See text
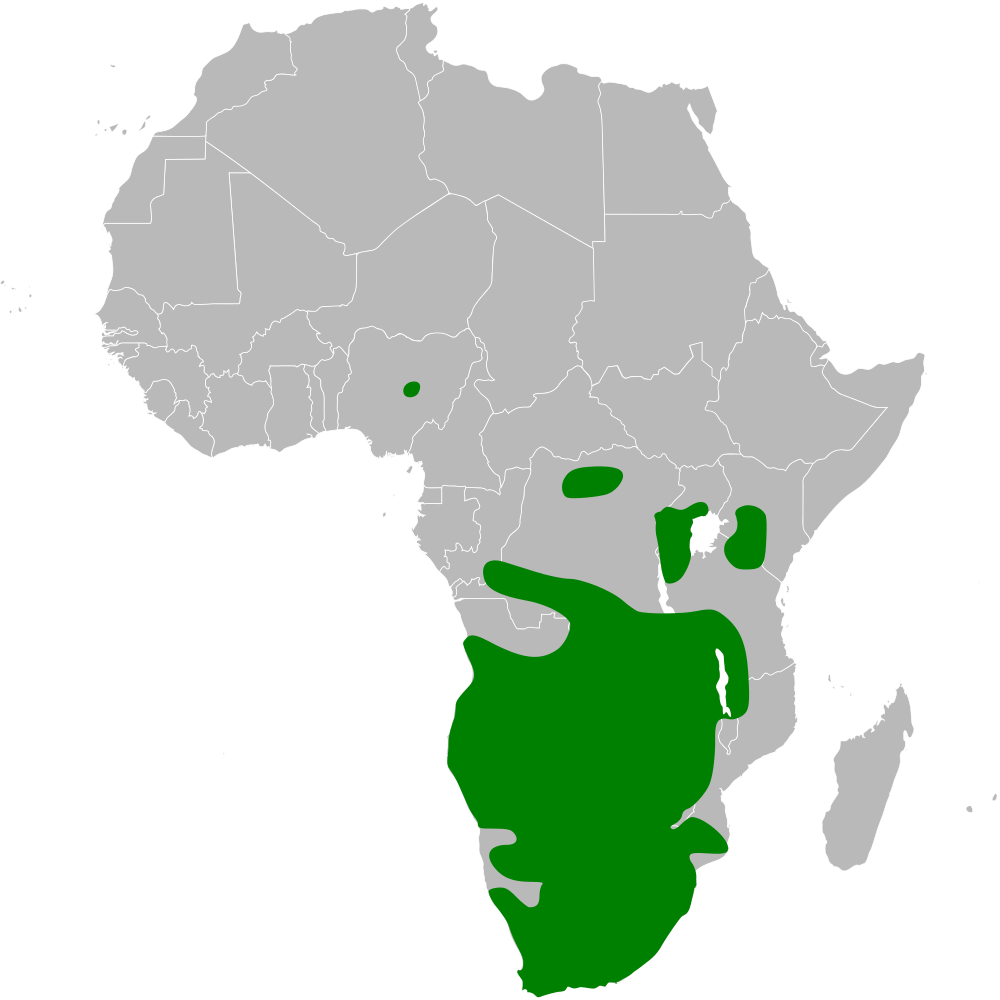
- approximate range

Synonyms
- Alauda cinerea; Calandrella brachydactyla cinerea

= Red-capped lark =

Species of bird

The red-capped lark (Calandrella cinerea) is a small passerine bird that breeds in the highlands of eastern Africa southwards from Ethiopia and Somaliland. In the south, its range stretches across the continent to Angola and south to the Cape in South Africa.

== Taxonomy ==
The red-capped lark was formally described in 1789 by the German naturalist Johann Friedrich Gmelin in his revised and expanded edition of Carl Linnaeus's Systema Naturae. He placed it with the larks in the genus Alauda and coined the binomial name Alauda cinerea. Gmelin based his description on "la Cendrille" from the Cape of Good Hope that had been described by the French polymath Comte de Buffon in 1778 and the "cinereous lark" that had been described by the English ornithologist John Latham in 1783. The red-capped lark is now one of six species placed in the genus Calandrella that was introduced in 1829 by the German naturalist Johann Jakob Kaup. The genus name is a diminutive of Ancient Greek kalandros, the calandra lark. The specific epithet cinerea is from Latin cinereus meaning "ash-grey" or "ash-coloured".

The red-capped lark was formerly considered to be conspecific with the Mongolian lark (Calandrella dukhunensis), the greater short-toed lark (Calandrella brachydactyla), the rufous-capped lark (Calandrella eremica) and Blandford's lark (Calandrella blanfordi). Alternate names for the red-capped lark include rufous short-toed lark and African short-toed lark, although the former may also describe the Somali short-toed lark.

=== Subspecies ===
Five subspecies are recognized:

- C. c. rufipecta (Stervander et al, 2020) – Jos Plateau in Nigeria
- C. c. williamsi Clancey, 1952 – central Kenya
- C. c. saturatior Reichenow, 1904 – Uganda and western Kenya south to Angola, north-eastern Namibia, northern Botswana and Zambia
- C. c. spleniata (Strickland, 1853) – west-central Angola to west-central Namibia
- C. c. cinerea (Gmelin, 1789) – southern and central Namibia, southern Botswana, Zimbabwe and South Africa

== Description ==
The red-capped lark is 14–15 cm (5.5–5.9 in) in length, with a typically upright stance. The colour of the streaked grey to brown upperparts is variable, with subspecies differing in hue and brightness, but this species is easily identified by its rufous cap, white underparts, and red shoulders. The short head crest is normally not noticeable except when it is raised during courtship displays.The sexes are similar in appearance. Juveniles lack the red cap and shoulders of the adults, have dark spotting on the breast, and white spots on the dark brown upperparts.

The call of the red-capped lark is a tshwerp like a sparrow, and the song, given in the display flight, is a jumble of whistles and short trills. It also imitates other birds.

== Distribution and habitat ==
This is a species of short grassland including fallow agricultural areas. In eastern Africa, it is found in the highlands, normally above 1000 m, but it occurs down to sea level in suitable habitat in the cooler south of its extensive range.

== Behaviour and ecology ==
=== Breeding ===
The red-capped lark breeds all year round, but mainly from September to December. The nest is built primarily by the female in 4 to 5 days. It is an open cup which is set into the ground and usually situated close to a grass tuft, stone or mound. The nest is lined with fine grass and rootlets. The eggs are laid at daily intervals. The clutch of 2–3 eggs is incubated by the female who is fed by the male. The eggs hatch synchronously after 12–15 days. The chicks are fed and cared for by both parents for a period of between 9 and 18 days.

=== Food and feeding ===
The red-capped lark forages on bare ground or in very short grass, moving with short runs to feed on seeds and insects. It is sometimes found in flocks which can number hundreds of birds.
