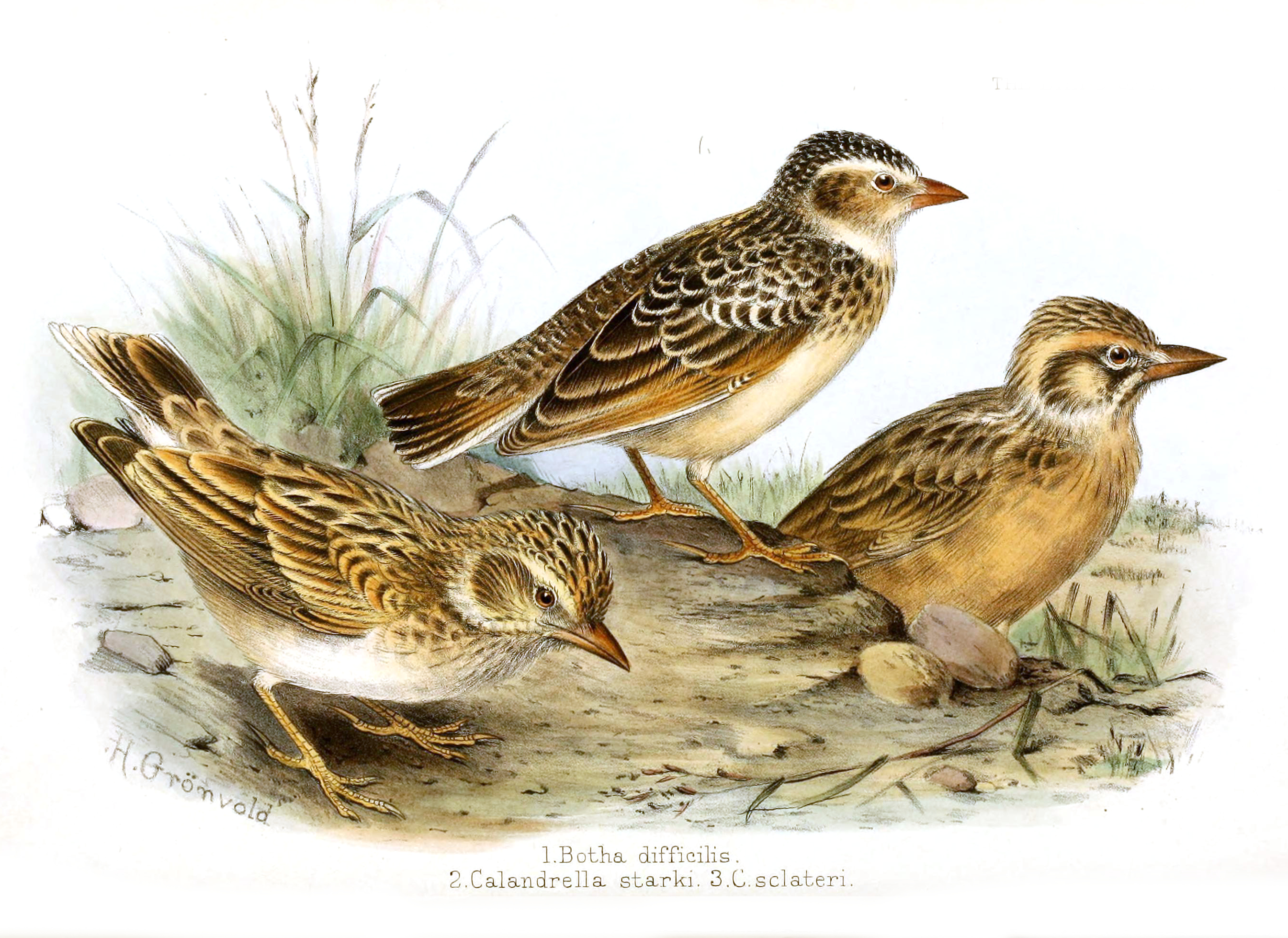
- Juvenile S. fringillaris (top), adult S. starki (left) and S. sclateri (right)

Scientific classification
- Kingdom: Animalia
- Phylum: Chordata
- Class: Aves
- Order: Passeriformes
- Family: Alaudidae
- Genus: Spizocorys; Sundevall, 1872

Type species
- Alauda conirostris Sundevall, 1850

Species
- 7, see text
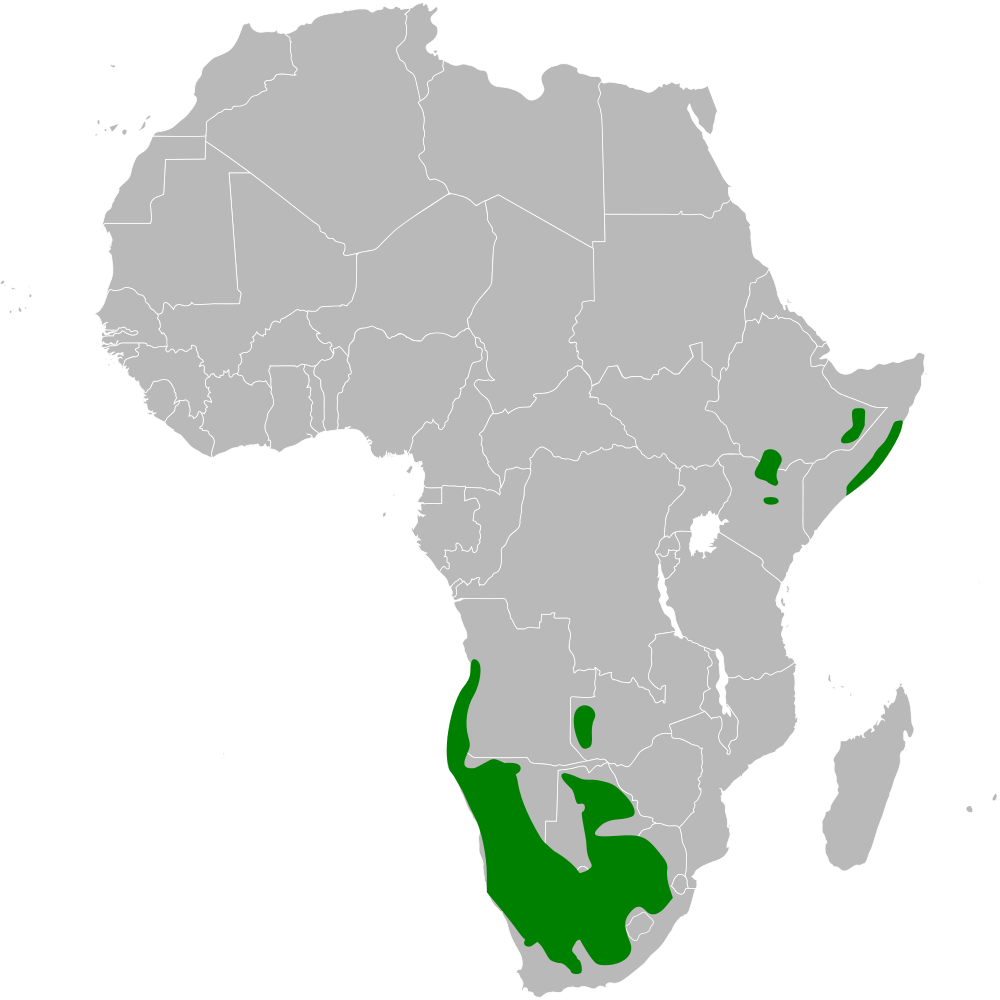
- range of genus

Synonyms
- Aëthocorys; Botha

= Spizocorys =

Genus of birds

Spizocorys is a genus of African larks in the family Alaudidae found in southern and eastern Africa.

== Taxonomy ==
The genus Spizocorys was introduced in 1872 by the Swedish zoologist Carl Jakob Sundevall with the type species as Alauda conirostris Sundevall, 1850, the pink-billed lark. The genus name combines the Ancient Greek σπιζα/spiza meaning "finch" or "sparrow" with Modern Latin corys meaning "lark".

=== Species ===
The genus contains the following seven species:

Image	Common name	Scientific name	Distribution
	Stark's lark	Spizocorys starki	Far southwestern Angola to Namibia, southwestern Botswana, and northwestern South Africa.
	Masked lark	Spizocorys personata	Ethiopia and Kenya.
	Pink-billed lark	Spizocorys conirostris	Central south Africa.
	Botha's lark	Spizocorys fringillaris	Northeastern South Africa (southern Mpumalanga and eastern Free State).
	Short-tailed lark	Spizocorys fremantlii	East and northeast Africa.
	Obbia lark	Spizocorys obbiensis	Desert of coastal Somalia.
	Sclater's lark	Spizocorys sclateri	Desert of southern Namibia and Cape Province.

=== Former species ===
Formerly, some authorities classified the following species as belonging to the genus:

- Raso lark (as Spizocorys razae)
- Blanford's lark (eremica) (as Spizocorys eremica)
- Athi short-toed lark (as Spizocorys athensis)
