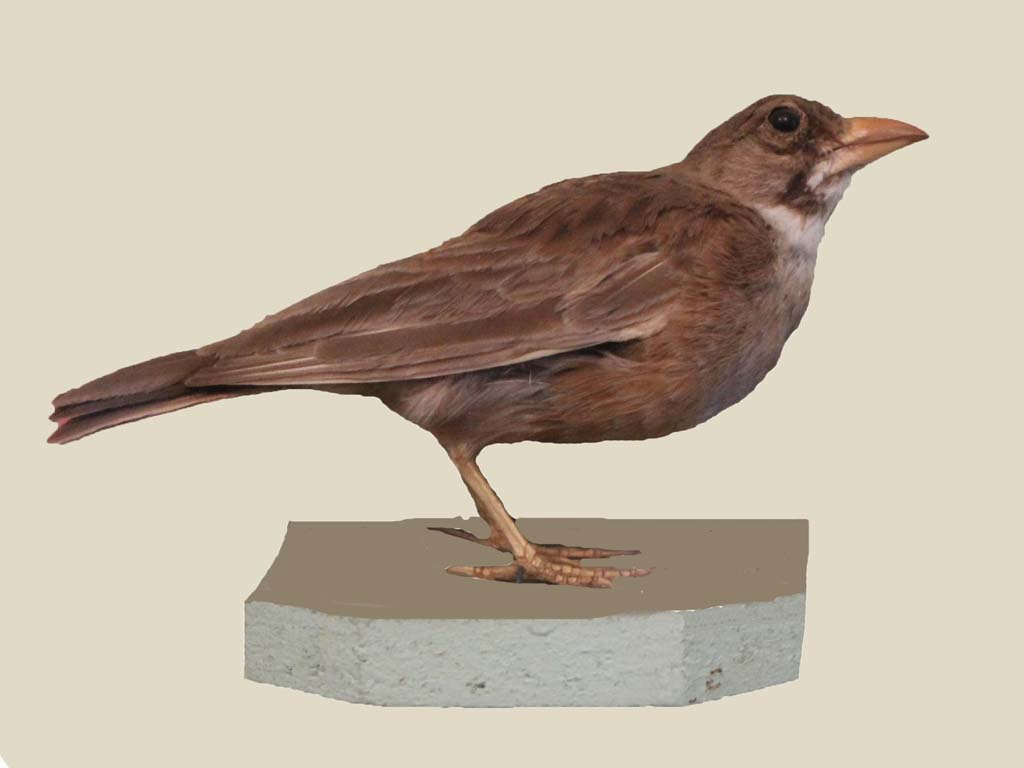
- Specimen at Nairobi National Museum
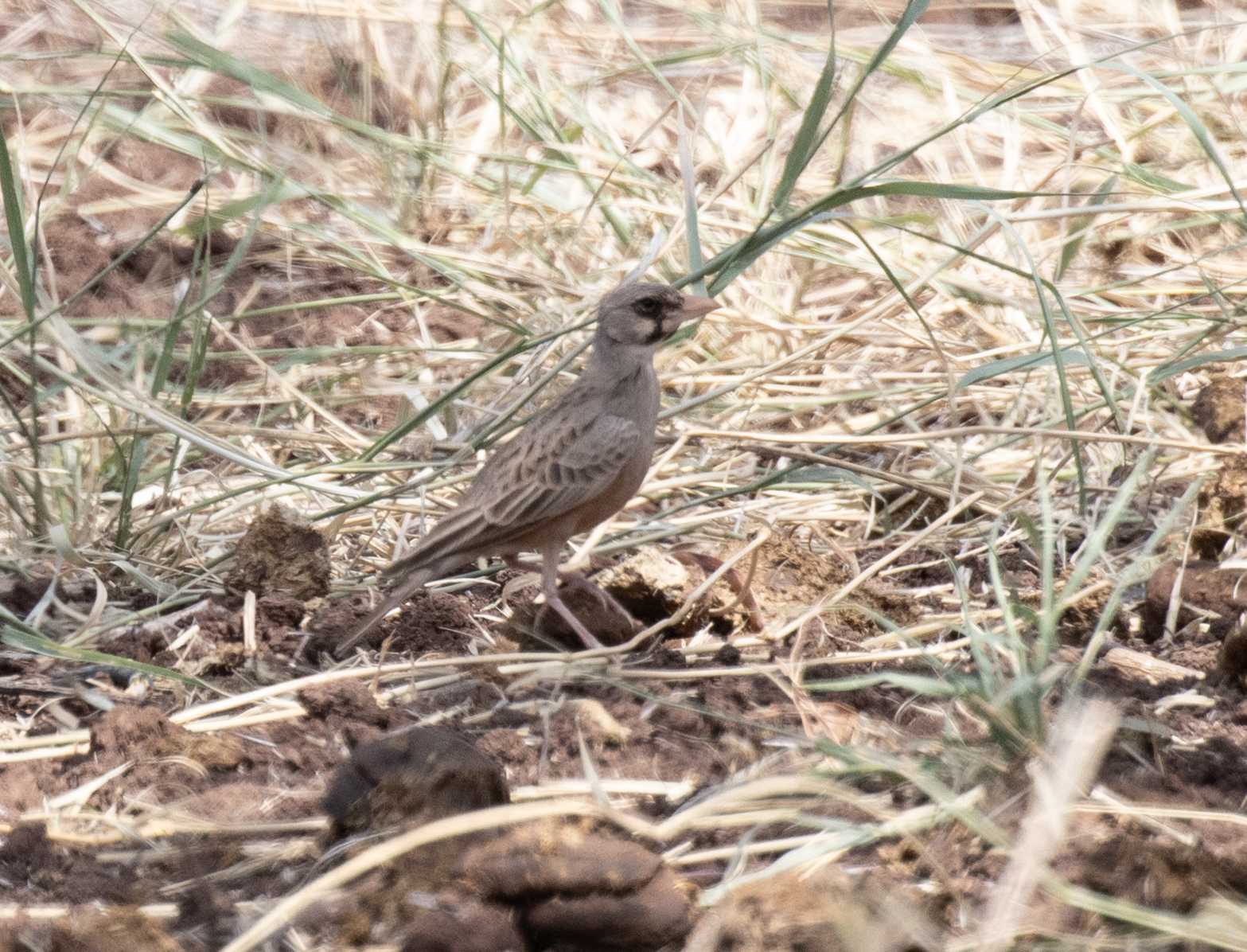

Conservation status
- Least Concern (IUCN 3.1)

Scientific classification
- Kingdom: Animalia
- Phylum: Chordata
- Class: Aves
- Order: Passeriformes
- Family: Alaudidae
- Genus: Spizocorys
- Species: S. personata

Binomial name
- Spizocorys personata Sharpe, 1895

Subspecies
- See text
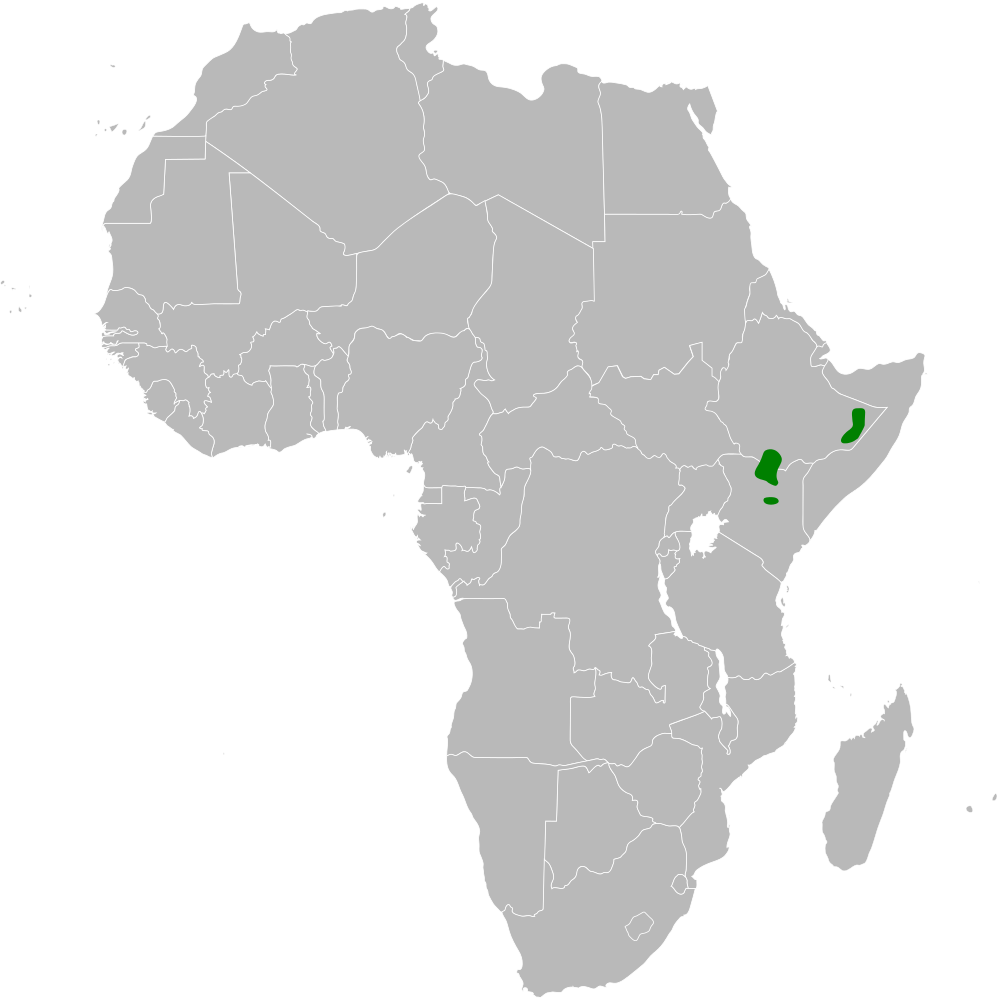
- Range

Synonyms
- Calandrella personata

= Masked lark =

Species of bird

The masked lark (Spizocorys personata) is a species of lark in the family Alaudidae. It is found in Ethiopia and Kenya. Its natural habitats are subtropical or tropical dry shrubland and subtropical or tropical dry lowland grassland.

== Taxonomy and systematics ==
Some authorities have placed the masked lark in the genus Calandrella.

=== Subspecies ===
Four subspecies are recognized:

- S. p. personata - Sharpe, 1895: Found in eastern Ethiopia
- S. p. yavelloensis - (Benson, 1947): Found in southern Ethiopia and northern Kenya
- S. p. mcchesneyi - (Williams, JG, 1957): Found on the Marsabit Plateau (northern Kenya)
- S. p. intensa - (Rothschild, 1931): Found in central Kenya
