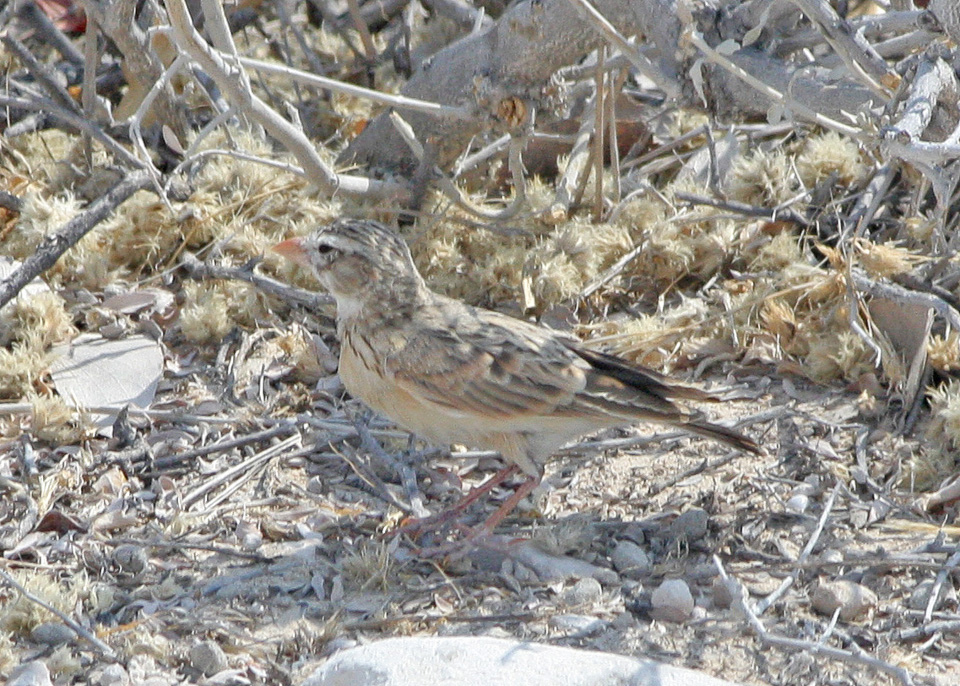

Conservation status
- Least Concern (IUCN 3.1)

Scientific classification
- Kingdom: Animalia
- Phylum: Chordata
- Class: Aves
- Order: Passeriformes
- Family: Alaudidae
- Genus: Spizocorys
- Species: S. conirostris

Binomial name
- Spizocorys conirostris (Sundevall, 1850)

Subspecies
- See text
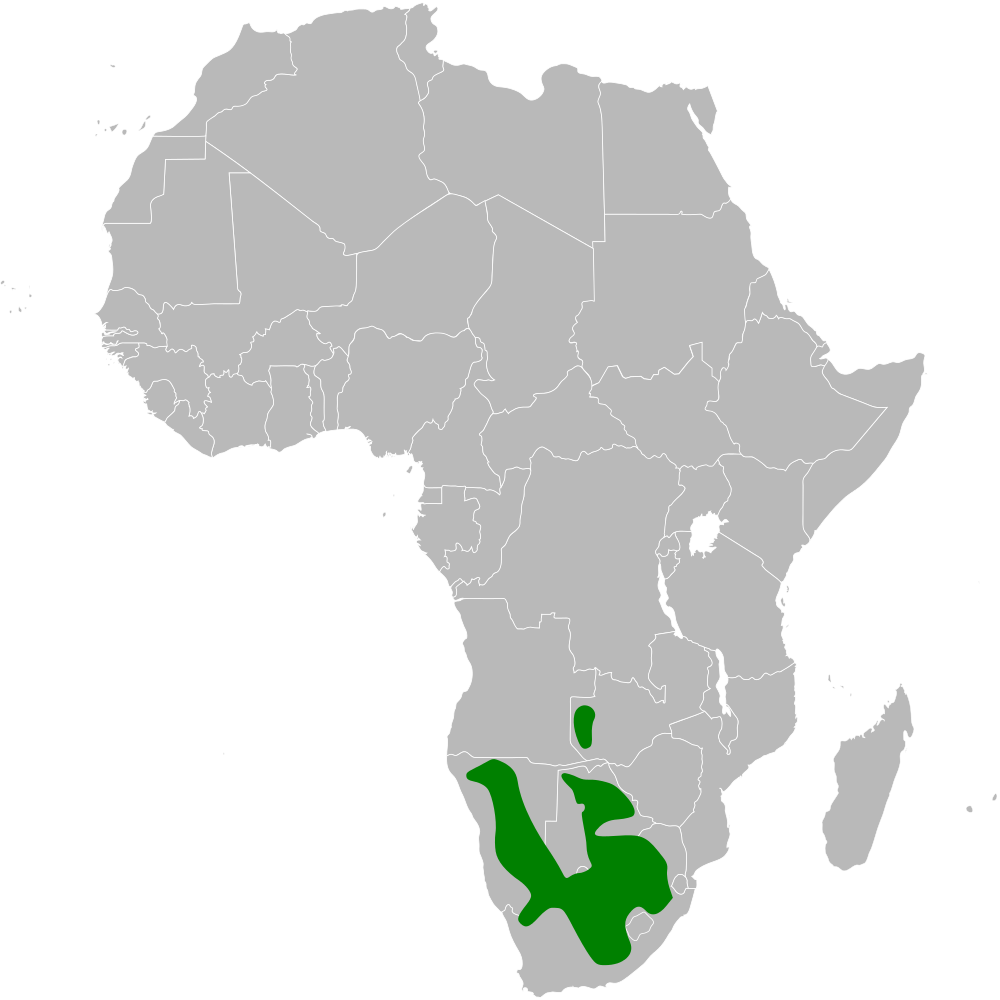
- Range

Synonyms
- Alauda conirostris; Calandrella conirostris

= Pink-billed lark =

Species of bird

The pink-billed lark (Spizocorys conirostris) is a species of lark in the family Alaudidae found in southern Africa. Its natural habitat is subtropical or tropical dry lowland grassland. It is described as having a low breeding success rate.

== Taxonomy and systematics ==
The pink-billed lark was originally classified within the genus Alauda. Some authorities have placed the pink-billed lark in the genus Calandrella.

=== Subspecies ===
Six subspecies are recognized:

- Damara pink-billed lark (S. c. damarensis) - Roberts, 1922: Alternately named Kenya short-toed lark (a name also used by the Athi short-toed lark). Found in north-western Namibia
- S. c. crypta - (Irwin, 1957): Found in north-eastern Botswana
- S. c. makawai - (Traylor, 1962): Found in western Zambia
- S. c. harti - (Benson, 1964): Found in south-western Zambia
- S. c. barlowi - Roberts, 1942: Found in southern Namibia, southern Botswana and north-western South Africa
- S. c. conirostris - (Sundevall, 1850): Found in south-eastern Botswana, northern, central and eastern South Africa

== Vocalizations ==
Twelve types of vocalizations have been recorded.

- Nestling begging call: nestlings hiss or peep when they see a parent flying toward the nest.
- Nestling distress call: nestlings make a harsh pulsed call when in distress
- Nestling feeding call: parents make a soft chi-chi-chi sound when feeding nestlings
- Threat call: harsh and grating
- Appeasement calls: either chattering or metallic, made by parents during incubation
- Alarm call: pulsed, with a sharp rise then gradual fall in frequency. Mostly made while in flight.
- Attack call: series of tsks, made while chasing other pink-billed larks
- Cricket call: soft and rapid, often made while in flight
- Foraging calls: soft, with mixed sounds
- Flight call: high-pitched, possibly unique to each individual. Usually made while flying in flocks
- Flight song: made by males when performing aerial display. Rapid and pulsed.
  - The bird stays silent while steeply ascending, then begins singing. It then flies irregularly while singing its flight song, which usually lasts less than a minute. It sometimes then descends sharply.
