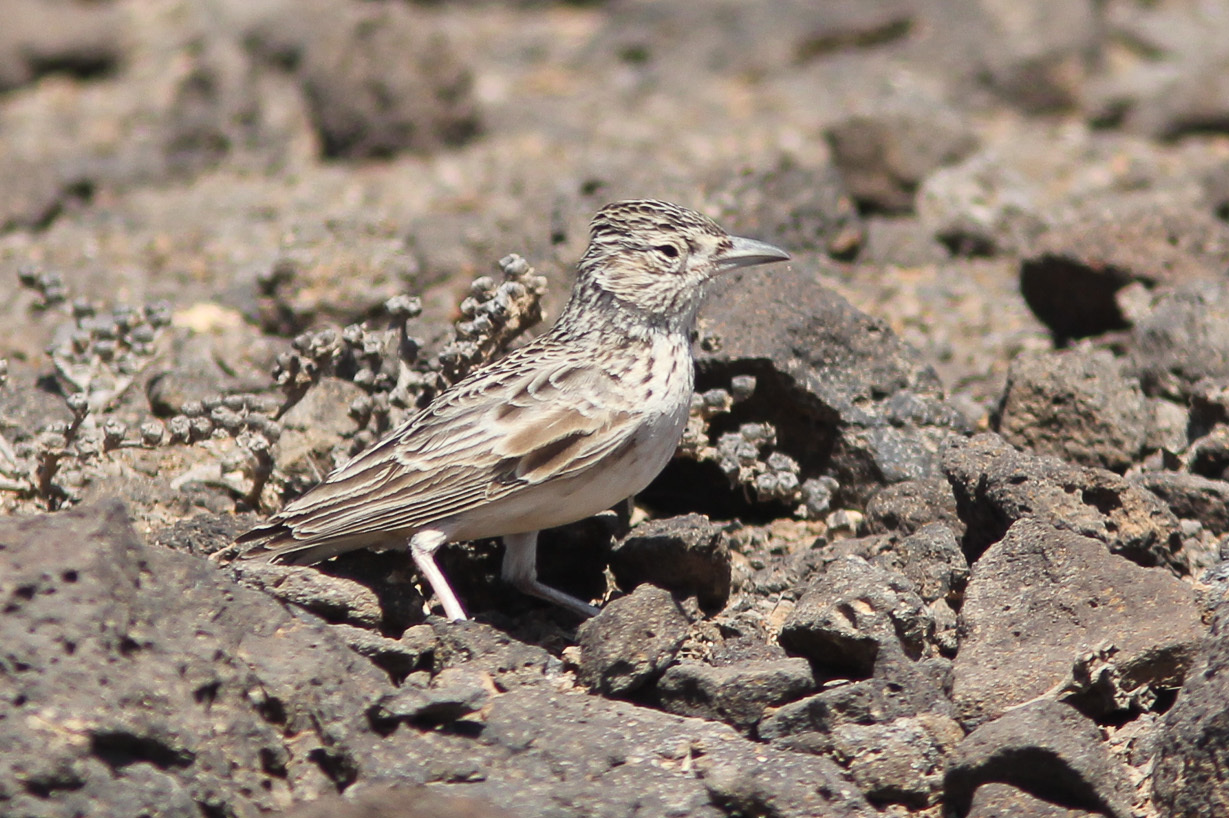

Conservation status
- Critically Endangered (IUCN 3.1)

Scientific classification
- Kingdom: Animalia
- Phylum: Chordata
- Class: Aves
- Order: Passeriformes
- Family: Alaudidae
- Genus: Alauda
- Species: A. razae

Binomial name
- Alauda razae (Alexander, 1898)
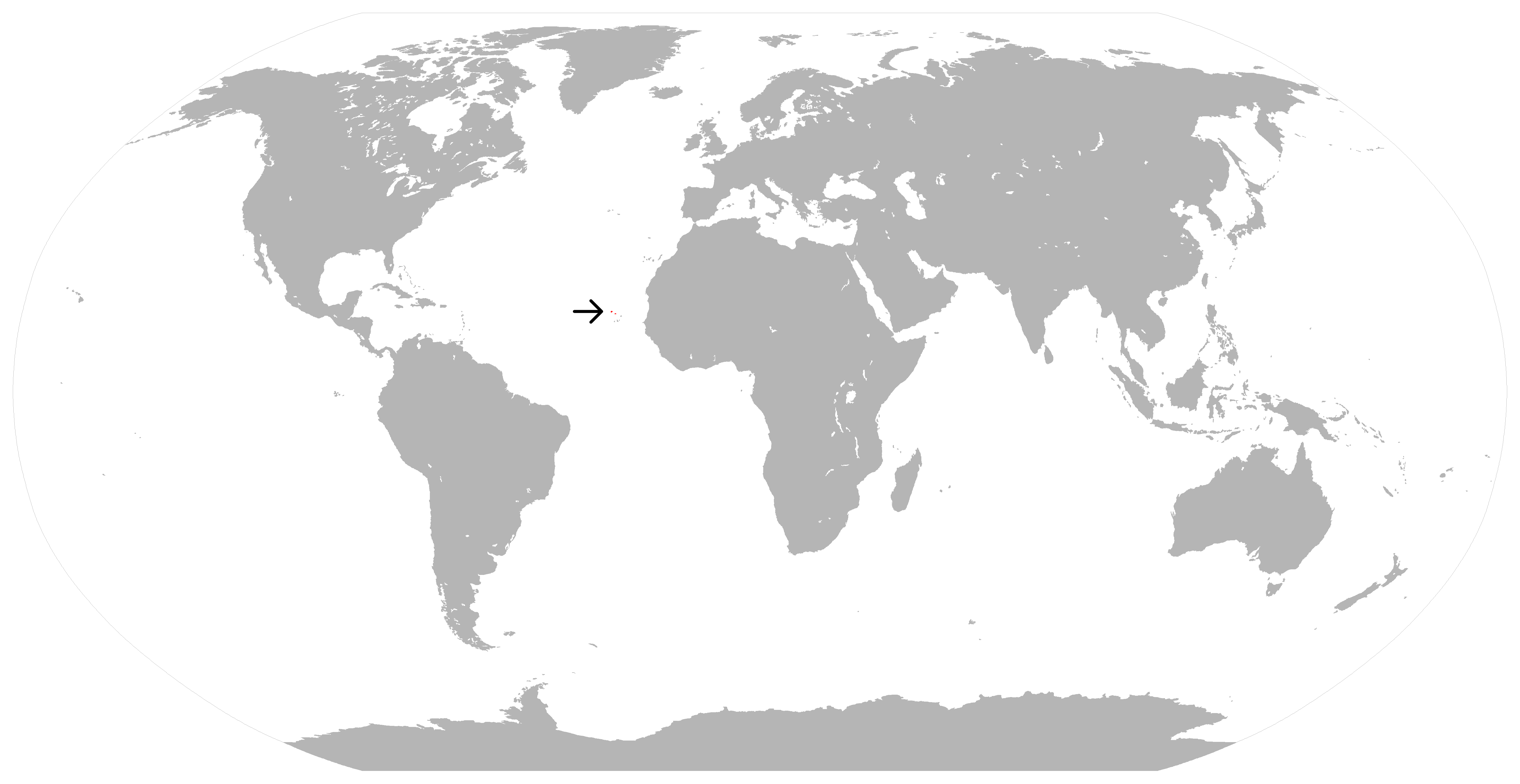

Synonyms
- Calandrella razae; Spizocorys razae

= Raso lark =

Species of bird

The Raso lark (Alauda razae) is a small passerine bird with a highly restricted range, being found only on Raso islet in the Cape Verde Islands. This critically endangered member of the family Alaudidae lives in very arid terrain, and is considered one of the least known birds in the Western Palaearctic region, due to its remoteness and the lack of much ornithological study on the archipelago as a whole.

== Taxonomy and systematics ==
Originally, the Raso lark was classified as belonging to the genus Spizocorys. Formerly or presently, some authorities considered the Raso lark to belong to the genus Calandrella. Alternate names for the Raso lark include Cape Verde Islands lark, Raso Island lark, Raso short-toed lark and Razo skylark.

== Description ==
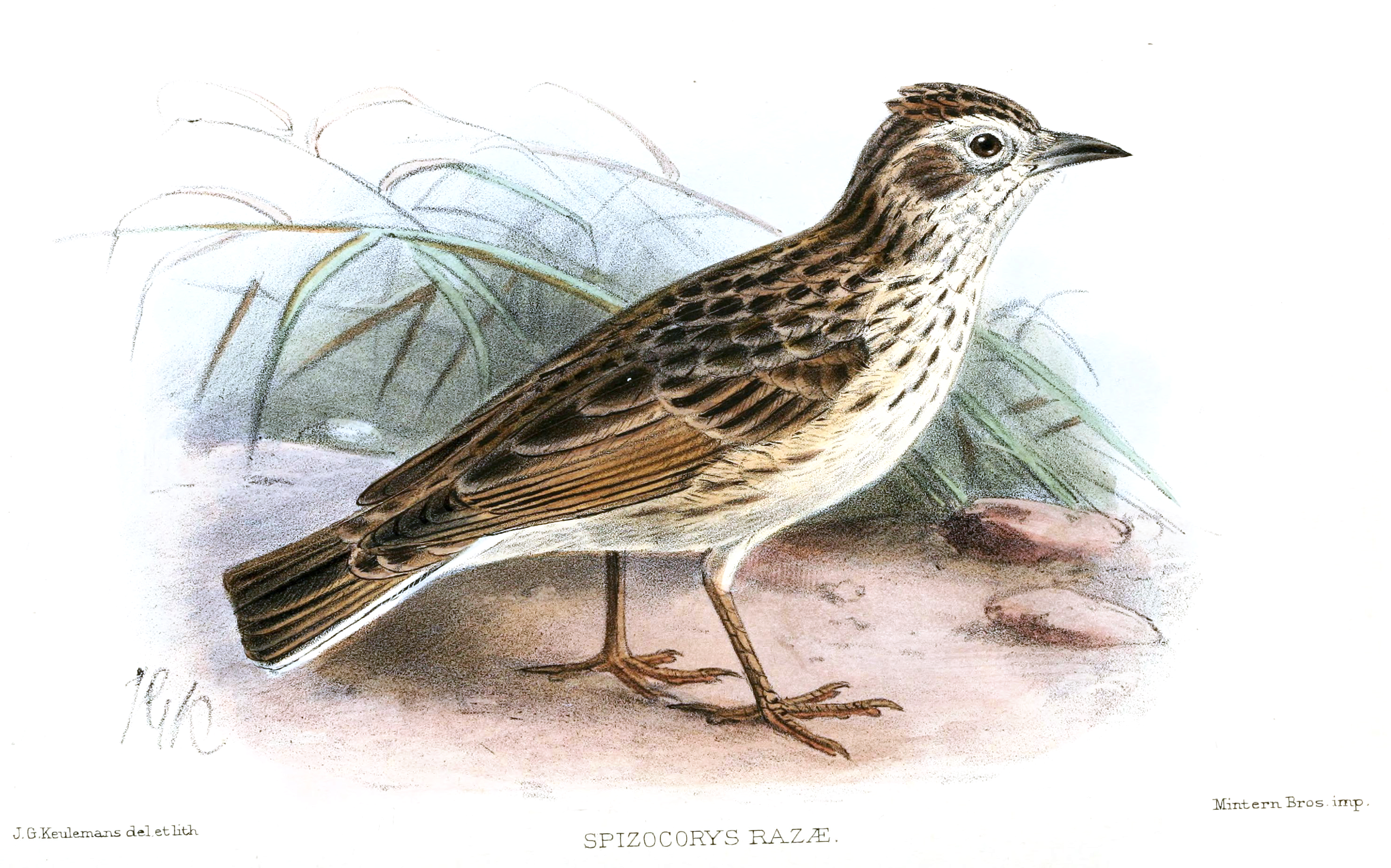

Raso larks are relatively small in size. The Raso larks can range from sizes between 14 and 18 cm. The adult population is mostly made up of males who are larger than the females. The body has black and brown short streaks and paler around the chest with an erectile crest. The bill is thick-based and robust, longer for the males. The Raso lark is considered an adult when it has developed a reddish-brown tone between the ears and tail, with a pattern on the crown and back. While in flight they display a short tail with short broad wings. The tail and edge of the wings are white.

== Distribution and habitat ==
The Raso lark is restricted in range to only Raso islet in the Cape Verde archipelago, although historically it is believed to have ranged over two other islands, Branco and São Vicente Island. All three of these islands were joined in the last ice age. Evidence from subfossil bone deposits reveal that the Raso lark once also existed on the islands of Santa Luzia, São Vicente, Santo Antão, and possibly Branco during the glacial times, before human colonization in the 15th century. Unfortunately, colonization was followed by a rapid extinction of local fauna. Raso islet itself has no permanent water and has never been inhabited by people, a fact that has probably saved the lark from extinction until now.

The island consists mostly of rocky desert with sandy parts in the west. Most Raso larks are found on level plains with volcanic soil and are associated with small vegetated patches along dry stream beds in which it feeds and breeds. Suitable breeding grounds on the island of Raso cover less than half of the island. The barren island suffers from frequent droughts which create dry plains that force the Raso larks to move across the island in search for food. Their most common areas of habitation are near dry river beds, but due to the scarcity of water, only patches of vegetation remain for Raso larks to reside in. Their nesting and feeding grounds consist of those same areas where vegetation is available. The Raso lark's sensitivity to drought has kept it endangered for several years due to the dry climate on the Cape Verde islands.

== Behaviour and ecology ==
A number of desert-dwelling larks have evolved long bills to aid in digging for food in the sandy environment but the enlarged bill of the Raso lark has evolved for dominance displays among males. Flocks have also been observed feeding among rocks close to the sea, and the birds excavate holes in sandy soil to extract the small bulbs of nutsedges, which are perennial weeds in the sedge family that superficially resemble grasses.

=== Breeding ===
Breeding is very unpredictable, as it is dependent on the occurrence of rain. Courtship behaviour is similar to that of the Eurasian skylark. The male courts the female by singing softly, raising its chest, and hopping up and down while the wings are spread open. Once done mating, both the male and female collect dried grass in order to build a nest. The male defends the nesting site while the female finds a safe location to build a nest.

The female Raso lark lays one to three eggs per clutch, usually a day apart. The incubation time is thought to be 15 days. During incubation the female sits on the eggs for ten-minute intervals and then goes off to find food. The Raso lark population changes rapidly in response to rain, and has fallen to extremely low levels during droughts (Ratcliffe et al. 1999, Donald et al. 2003, Donald and Brooke 2006). The females, even though smaller in size, still provide by gathering bulbs while the males stay in the burrows and vigorously watch over the nest, protecting it from outside intruders. The Raso lark is not considered very fit for reproductive success and their reproductive success is very low. The adult sex ratio is unbalanced, with a high proportion of the population being male.

=== Food and feeding ===
The Raso lark feeds by digging in the ground for insect larvae, and bulbs of the nutsedge. Both sexes also feed on grass seeds, and insects such as butterflies, moths and grasshoppers. Food and water for the Raso lark is scarce during the drought seasons. These necessities are provided by eating Cyperus bulbosus or Cyperus cadamosti which are bulbs of nutsedges. Males and females have different-sized bills, which is why it was thought that males fed more on bulbs than females do. To get to a bulb the Raso lark must use its beak to dig burrows in the sandy soil. New studies are showing that males consume more bulbs than females not because of the difference in bill size; males' bills are 20% larger than females' bills (Donald 2007); but males consume more bulbs because males control the territories (Donald 2007). Females can dig the burrows just as well as the males. Males dig 0.32 bulbs per minute and females dig 0.36 bulbs per minute (Donald 2007). Males dig for 61.8 seconds while females dig for 58.0 seconds (Donald 2007). Females are just as adequate at digging as males, but they only spend about 1/3 as much time digging as males do. Because of this, females spend significantly more time feeding from the surface (Donald 2007). The males protect these territories, which usually have more than one burrow that provides them with food, even from the females of their species (Donald 2007). Females are dying at a much faster rate because of this and because their only source of food without the bulbs are insects and grass seeds. Females spend a larger portion of their time foraging which means less time looking out for predators and they also have a higher food stress which both can lead to their deaths (Donald 2007). During times of little food, the females are the ones to die from starvation because they have to find bulbs for the male and incubate the eggs.

=== Threats ===
The Raso lark is threatened by predators such as the Cape Verde giant gecko and birds such as the lesser Cape Verde kestrel, brown-necked raven, and Cape Verde barn owl, which make it difficult for them to survive. Additionally, Raso larks are vulnerable to the threat of accidental introduction of cats, dogs, rats by fishermen or other visitors to the island. Within the habitat of the Raso lark, the Cape Verde giant geckos weigh roughly 100 g and include juvenile birds in their diet. The Cape Verde Giant Gecko eats most chicks and eggs before they are hatched and fledged. Many aspects of the species' ecology and behaviour closely resemble that of the Eurasian skylark.

== Status ==
The tiny population size, which fluctuates from ~200-1,000 birds, coupled with the highly skewed sex ratio (around two males to each female) make this species critically endangered. The reproductive success of the birds is very low, likely due to predation by the near-endemic Cape Verde giant gecko. Although the island is currently free of mammalian predators such as rats or feral cats, and is a closed reserve, the likelihood of a single accidental introduction causing catastrophic damage remains high. It has been proposed that re-establishing a second population on the gecko-free island of Santa Luzia should be a conservation priority.

== Gallery ==
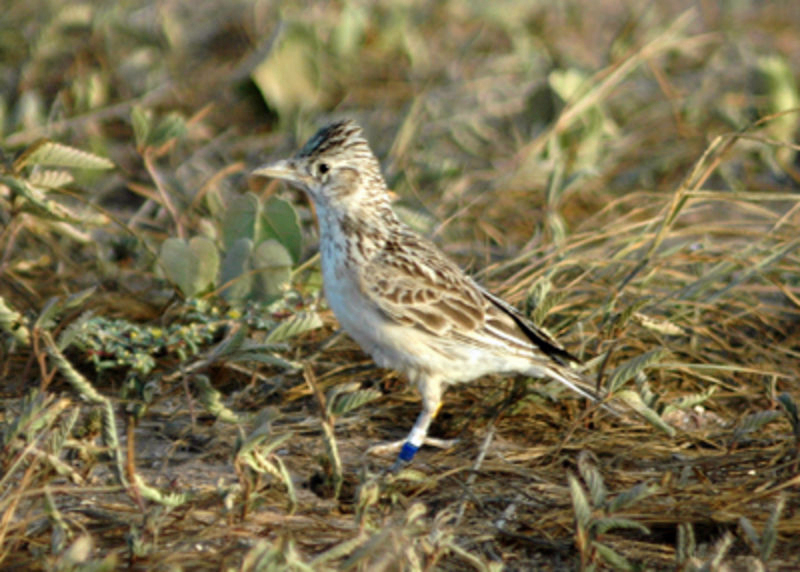

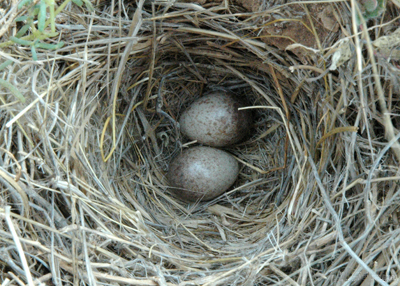
Raso lark eggs

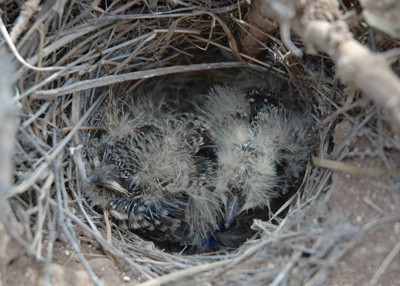
Raso lark chicks

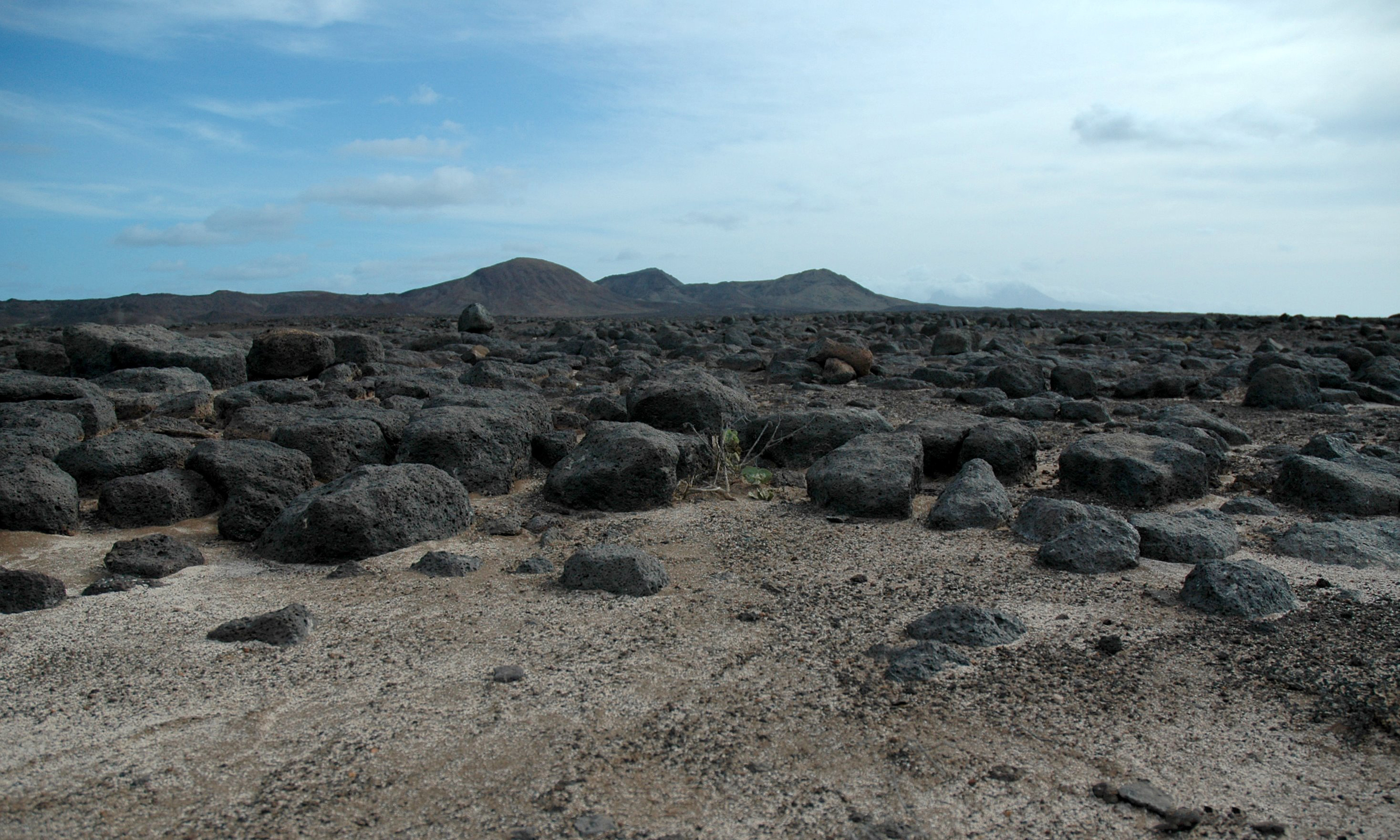
Raso Island with location of Raso lark nest in centre of view

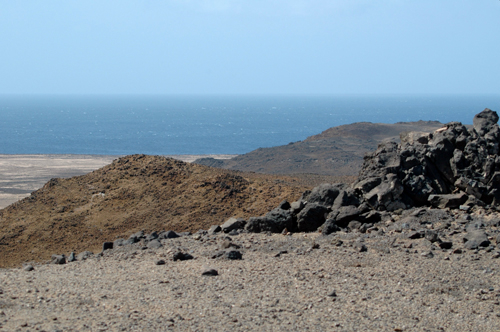
View from Raso

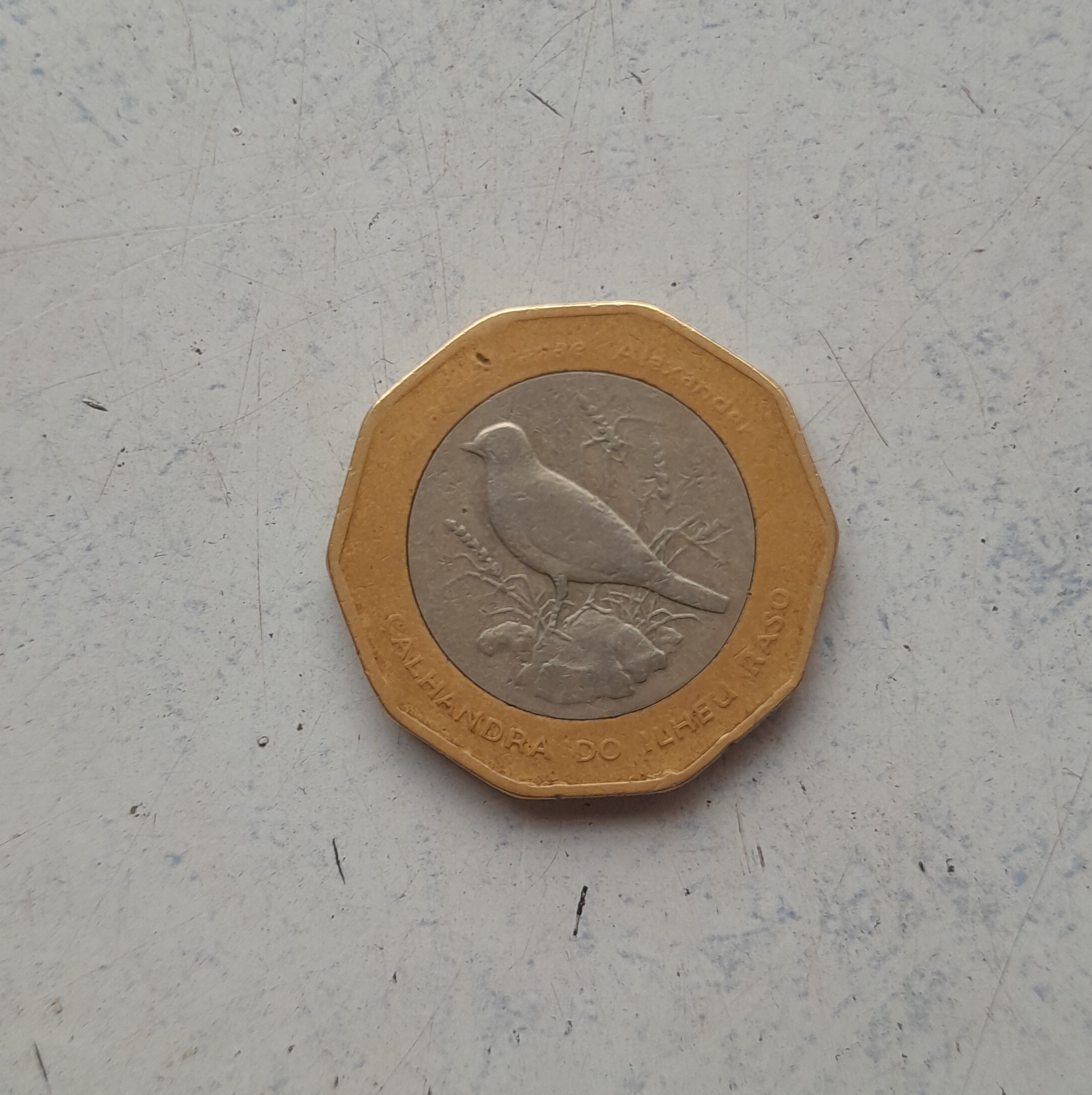
A $100 escudo coin featuring Alauda razae
