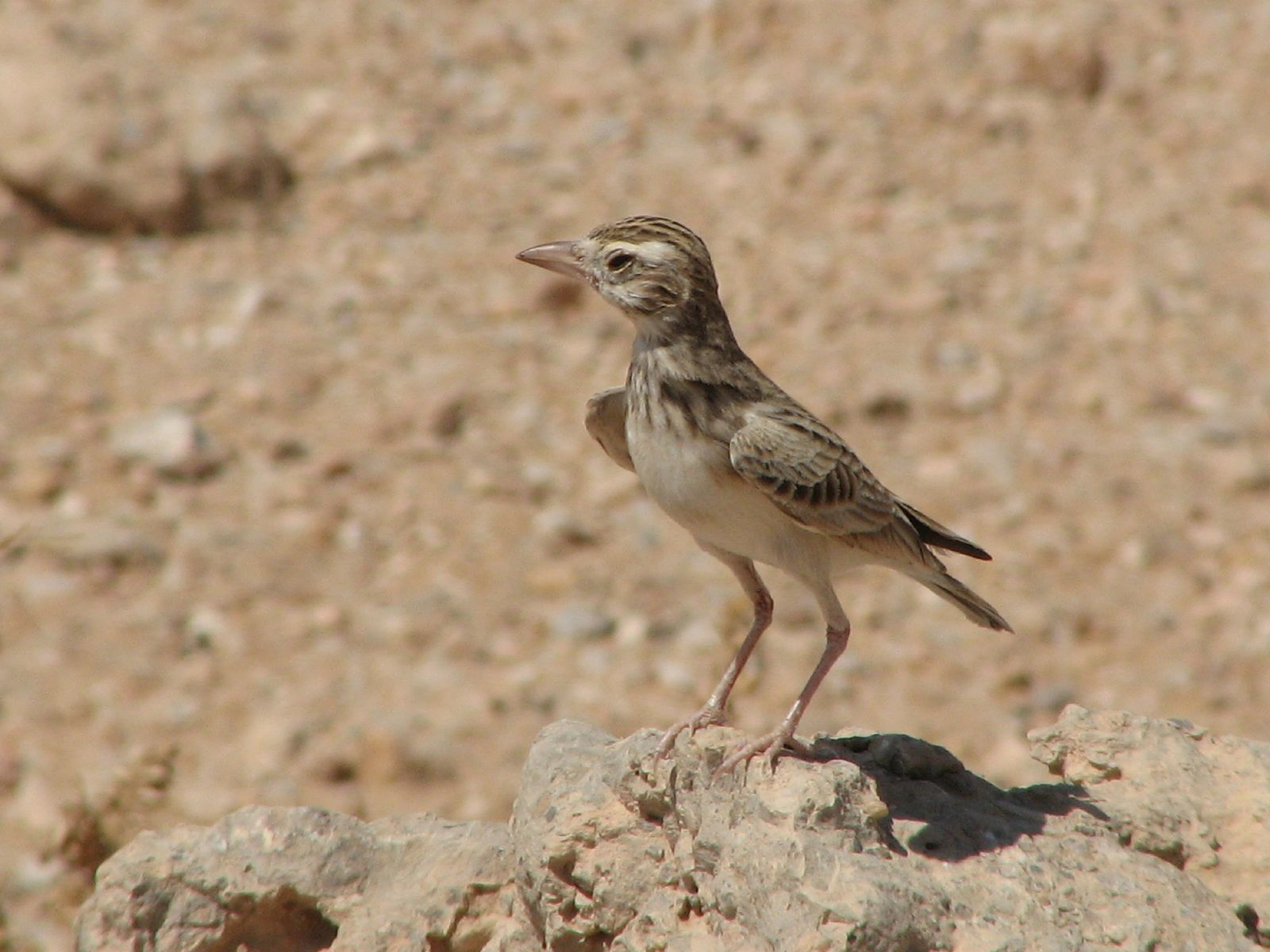

Conservation status
- Least Concern (IUCN 3.1)

Scientific classification
- Kingdom: Animalia
- Phylum: Chordata
- Class: Aves
- Order: Passeriformes
- Family: Alaudidae
- Genus: Spizocorys
- Species: S. starki

Binomial name
- Spizocorys starki (Shelley, 1902)
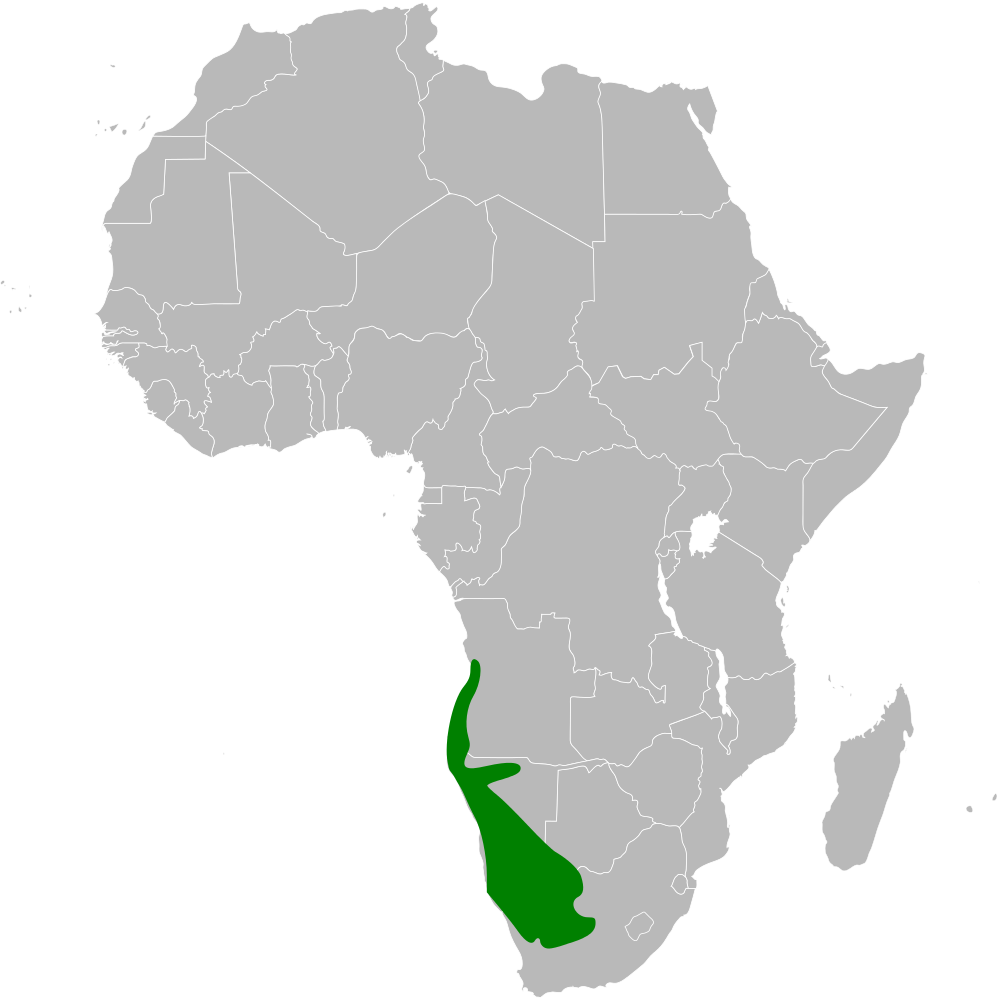
- range

Synonyms
- Calandrella starki; Eremalauda starki

= Stark's lark =

Species of bird

Stark's lark (Spizocorys starki) is a species of lark in the family Alaudidae. It is found in Angola, Botswana, Namibia, and South Africa. Its natural habitats are dry savannah and subtropical or tropical dry shrubland. Captain George Shelley named the species in honour of Arthur Stark.

== Taxonomy and systematics ==
Stark's lark was originally classified in the genus Calandrella and was then moved from the genus Eremalauda to Spizocorys in 2009. This species is alternately named as Stark's short-toed lark.

== Description ==
It is a pale medium-small lark with a pale, stout bill that appears slightly swollen. It exhibits a subtle streaky pattern on its sandy-brown upperparts and a distinct pale eyebrow. The underparts are whitish with faint streaking, and the lark often displays a raised, streaked crest.

== Ecology ==
Stark's Larks are highly mobile, exhibiting nomadic behavior. Following rainfall events, they may form flocks ranging from small groups to large ones, occasionally associating with other species such as sparrow-larks or buntings. These birds exhibit a preference for arid grasslands characterized by gravel substrates, avoiding sandy areas. To cope with high ambient temperatures, they seek shade and assume a posture with an elevated crest, an open mouth, partially closed eyes, and drooped wings. During courtship displays, they perform aerial acrobatics accompanied by a repertoire of trills, whistles, and chirps.
