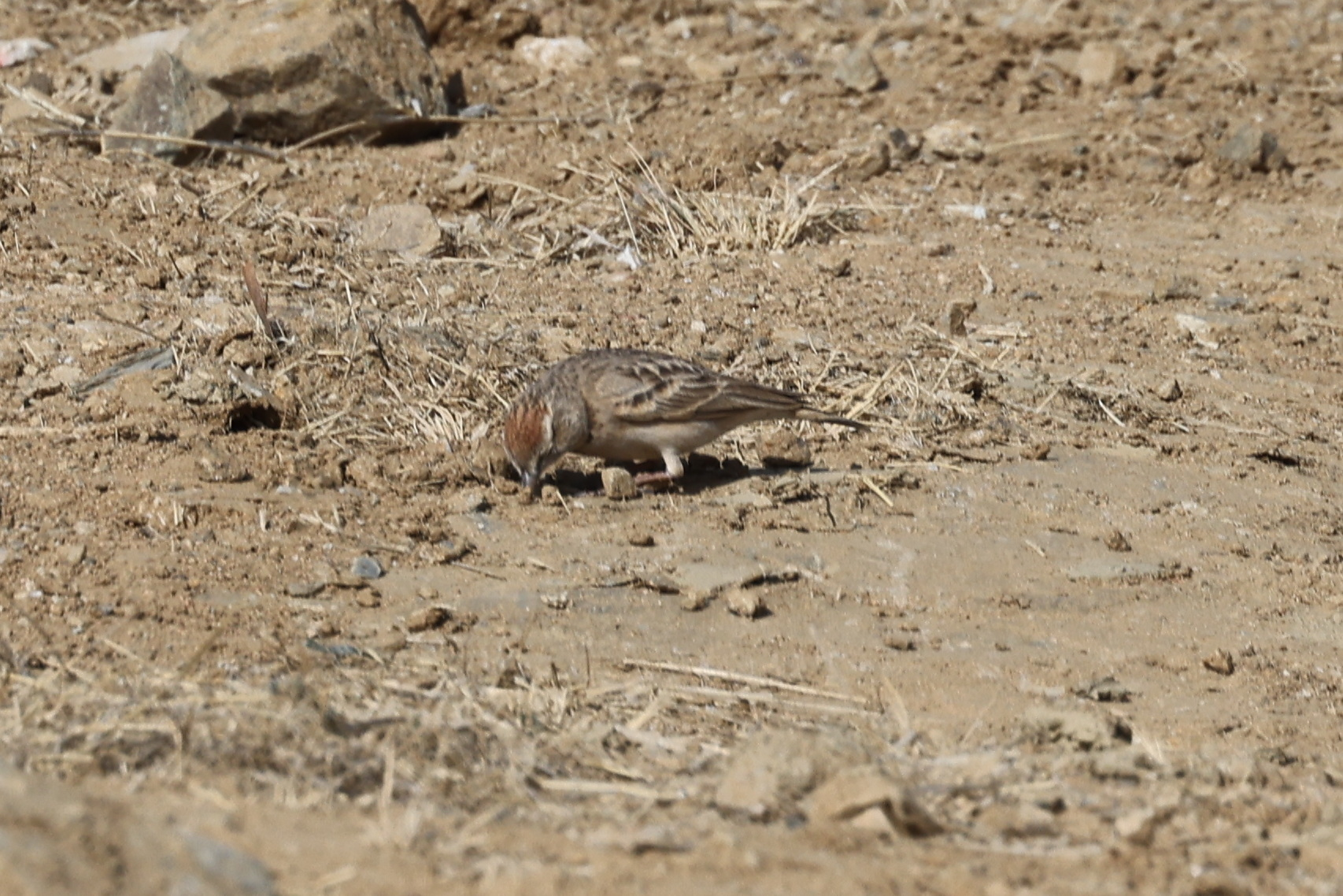

Conservation status
- Least Concern (IUCN 3.1)

Scientific classification
- Kingdom: Animalia
- Phylum: Chordata
- Class: Aves
- Order: Passeriformes
- Family: Alaudidae
- Genus: Calandrella
- Species: C. eremica

Binomial name
- Calandrella eremica (Reichenow & Peters, N, 1932)

Subspecies
- C. e. eremica - (Reichenow & Peters, N, 1932); C. e. daaroodensis - (White, CMN, 1960)

= Rufous-capped lark =

Species of bird

The rufous-capped lark (Calandrella eremica) is a small passerine bird of the lark family found in southwestern Arabia and the Horn of Africa.

It was considered to be a subspecies of Blanford's lark.
