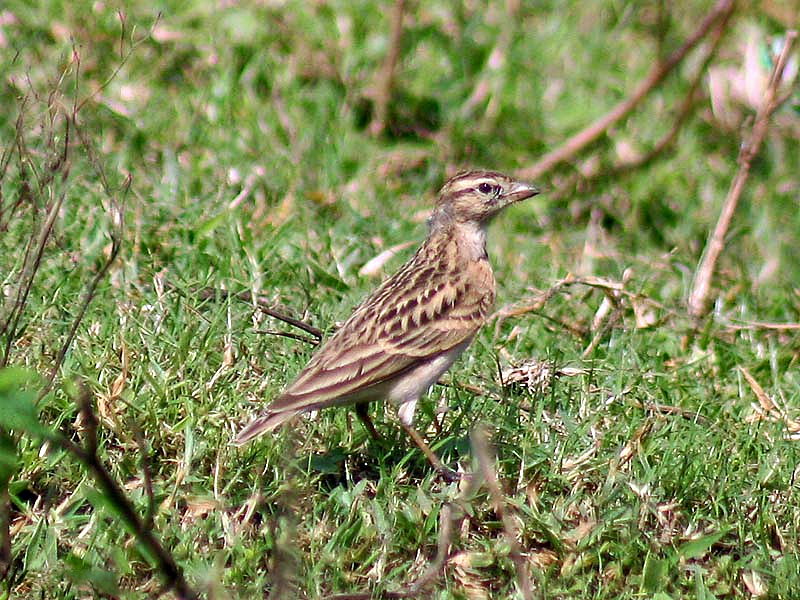
- Greater short-toed lark (Calandrella brachydactyla)

Scientific classification
- Kingdom: Animalia
- Phylum: Chordata
- Class: Aves
- Order: Passeriformes
- Family: Alaudidae
- Genus: Calandrella; Kaup, 1829

Type species
- Alauda brachydactyla Leisler, 1814

Species
- see text

Synonyms
- Tephrocorys

= Calandrella =

Genus of birds

Calandrella is a genus of larks in the family Alaudidae.

== Taxonomy and systematics ==
The genus Calandrella was established by the German naturalist Johann Jakob Kaup in 1829 with the greater short-toed lark as the type species. The genus name is a diminutive of Ancient Greek kalandros, the calandra lark. Four of the species in the genus use the shortened name of short-toed lark as an alternate name.

=== Extant species ===
Six species are recognized in the genus:

Image	Scientific name	Common name	Distribution
	Calandrella acutirostris	Hume's short-toed lark	from Iran and Kazakhstan to China.
	Calandrella dukhunensis	Mongolian short-toed lark	China and Mongolia
	Calandrella blanfordi	Blanford's lark	northeast Africa and Arabia
	Calandrella eremica	Rufous-capped lark	southwestern Arabia and Somaliland.
	Calandrella cinerea	Red-capped lark	Ethiopia and Somaliland
	Calandrella brachydactyla	Greater short-toed lark	southern edge of the Sahara and India

=== Extinct species ===
At least one fossil species is included in this genus:

- †Calandrella gali (late Miocene of Polgardi, Hungary)

=== Former species ===
Some authorities have classified the following species as belonging to the genus Calandrella:

- Buckley's lark (as Calandrella buckleyi)
- Obbia lark (as Calandrella obbiensis)
- Sclater's lark (as Calandrella sclateri)
- Stark's lark (as Calandrella starki)
- Masked lark (as Calandrella personata)
- Botha's lark (as Calandrella fringillaris)
- Pink-billed Lark (as Calandrella conirostris)
- Raso lark (as Calandrella razae)
- Athi short-toed lark (as Calandrella athensis)
- Asian short-toed lark (as Calandrella cheleensis)
- Kazakhstan lesser short-toed lark (as Calandrella leucophaea)
- Somali short-toed lark (as Calandrella somalica)
- Sand lark (as Calandrella raytal)
