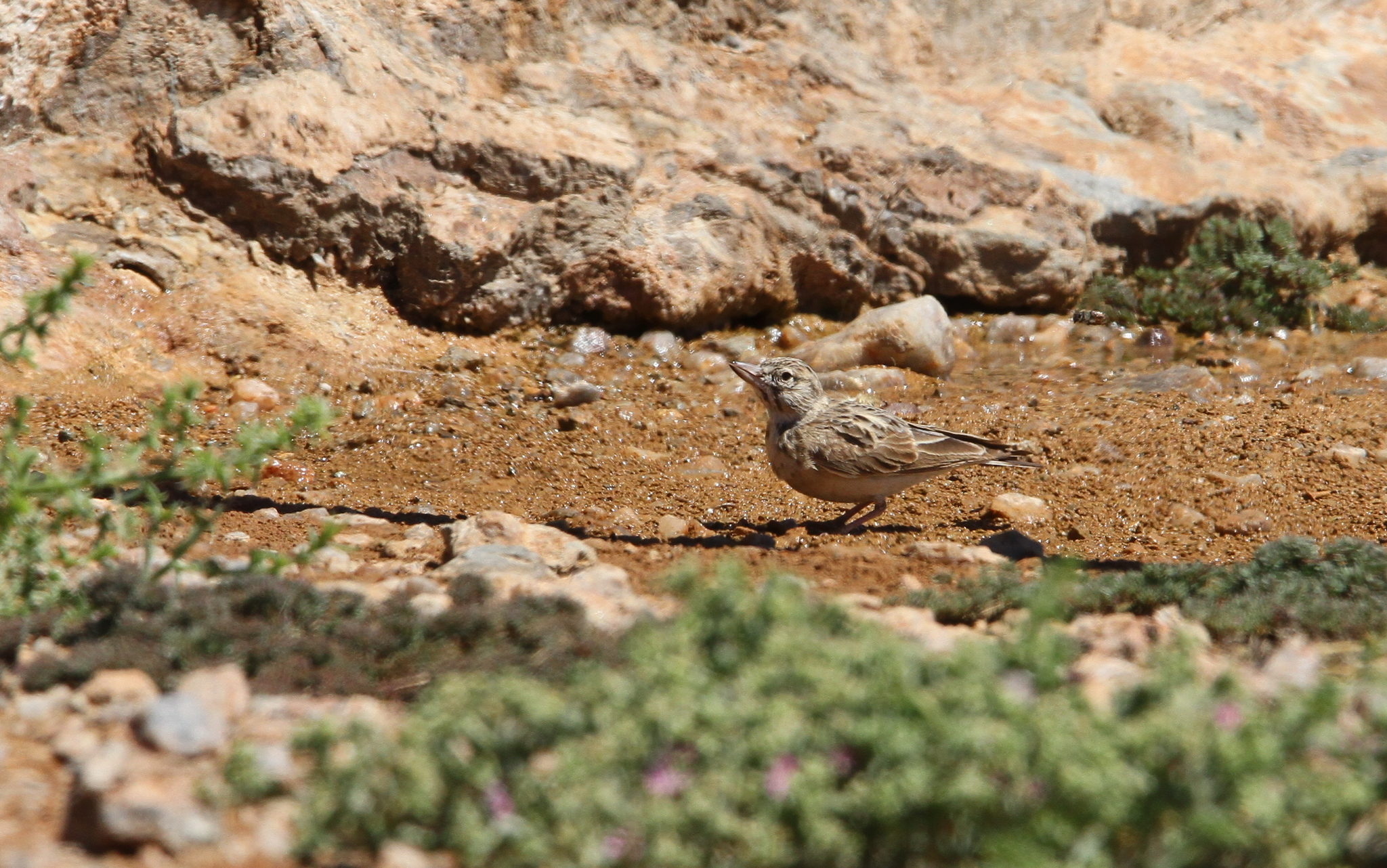

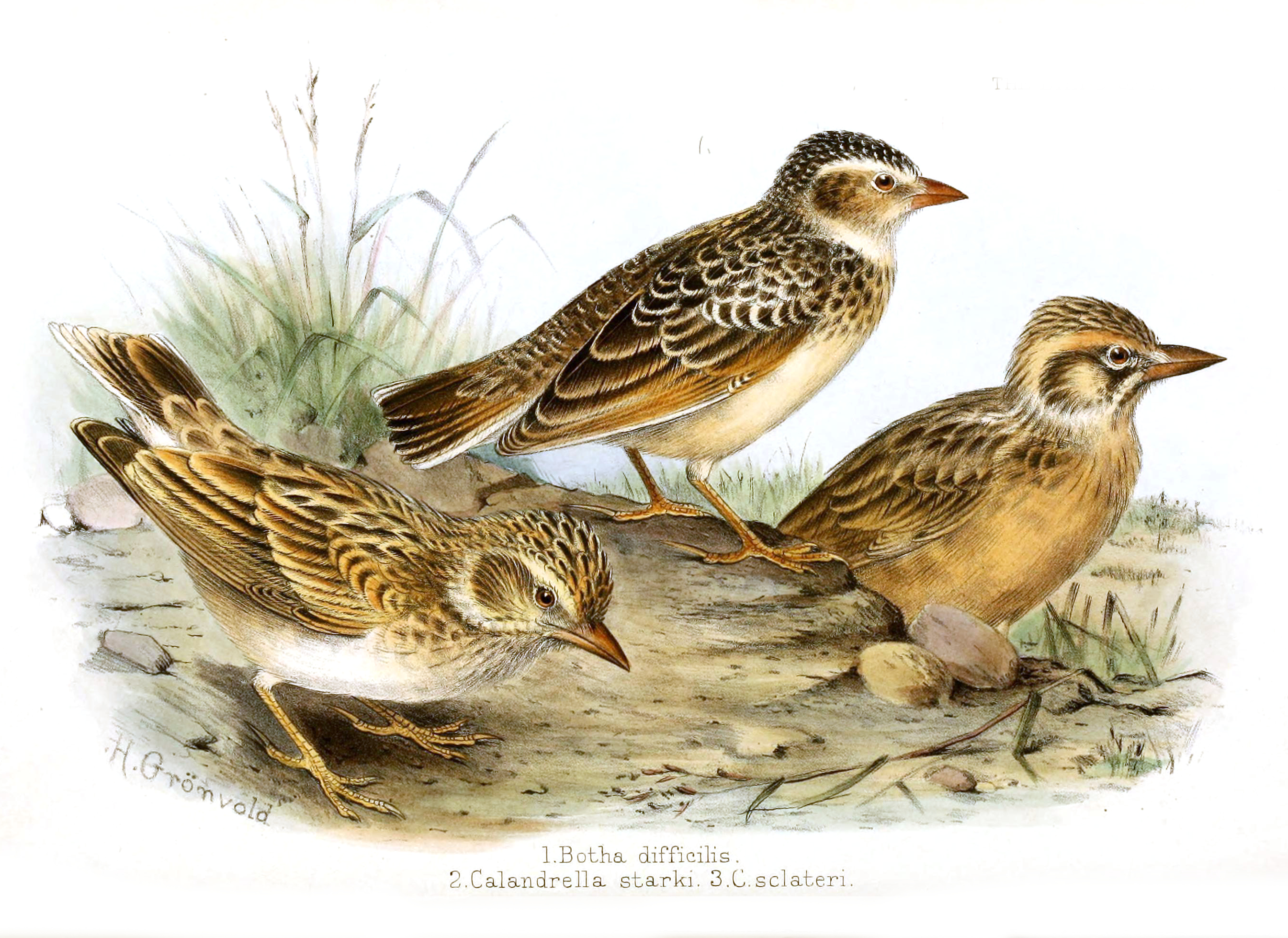
- Sclater's lark (right)

Conservation status
- Near Threatened (IUCN 3.1)

Scientific classification
- Kingdom: Animalia
- Phylum: Chordata
- Class: Aves
- Order: Passeriformes
- Family: Alaudidae
- Genus: Spizocorys
- Species: S. sclateri

Binomial name
- Spizocorys sclateri (Shelley, 1902)
- IUCN distribution of Sclater's lark Extant (resident)
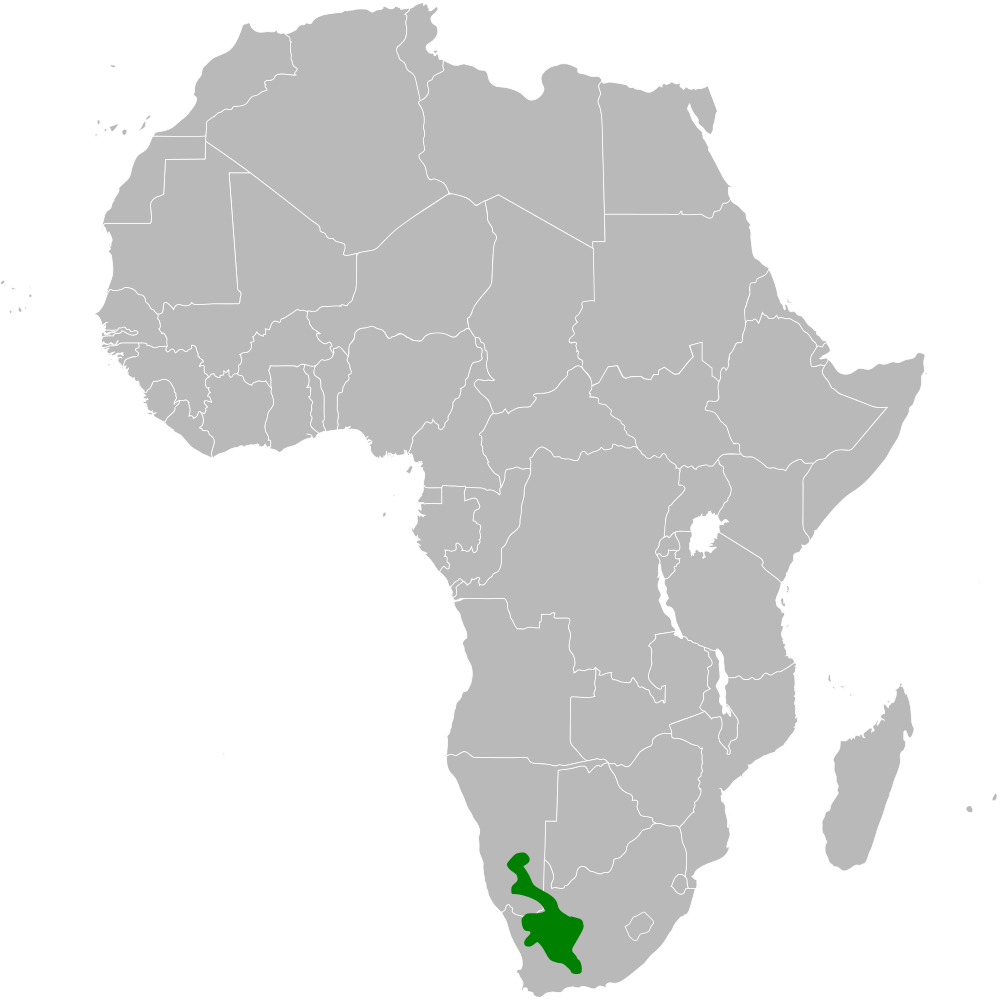

Synonyms
- Calandrella sclateri

= Sclater's lark =

Species of bird

Sclater's lark (Spizocorys sclateri) is a species of lark in the family Alaudidae. It is found in Namibia and South Africa. Its natural habitat is subtropical or tropical dry shrubland. It is threatened by habitat loss.

== Taxonomy and systematics ==
The common name and the Latin binomial commemorate the British zoologist Philip Lutley Sclater.

Sclater's lark was originally placed within the genus Calandrella and some authorities continue to recognise that classification. This species is alternately named as Sclater's short-toed lark.

== Conservation status ==
Sclater's lark is classified as Near Threatened due to its scarce and localised population in the Nama Karoo.
