= Obbia lark =

Conservation status
- Least Concern (IUCN 3.1)

Scientific classification
- Kingdom: Animalia
- Phylum: Chordata
- Class: Aves
- Order: Passeriformes
- Family: Alaudidae
- Genus: Spizocorys
- Species: S. obbiensis

Binomial name
- Spizocorys obbiensis Witherby, 1905
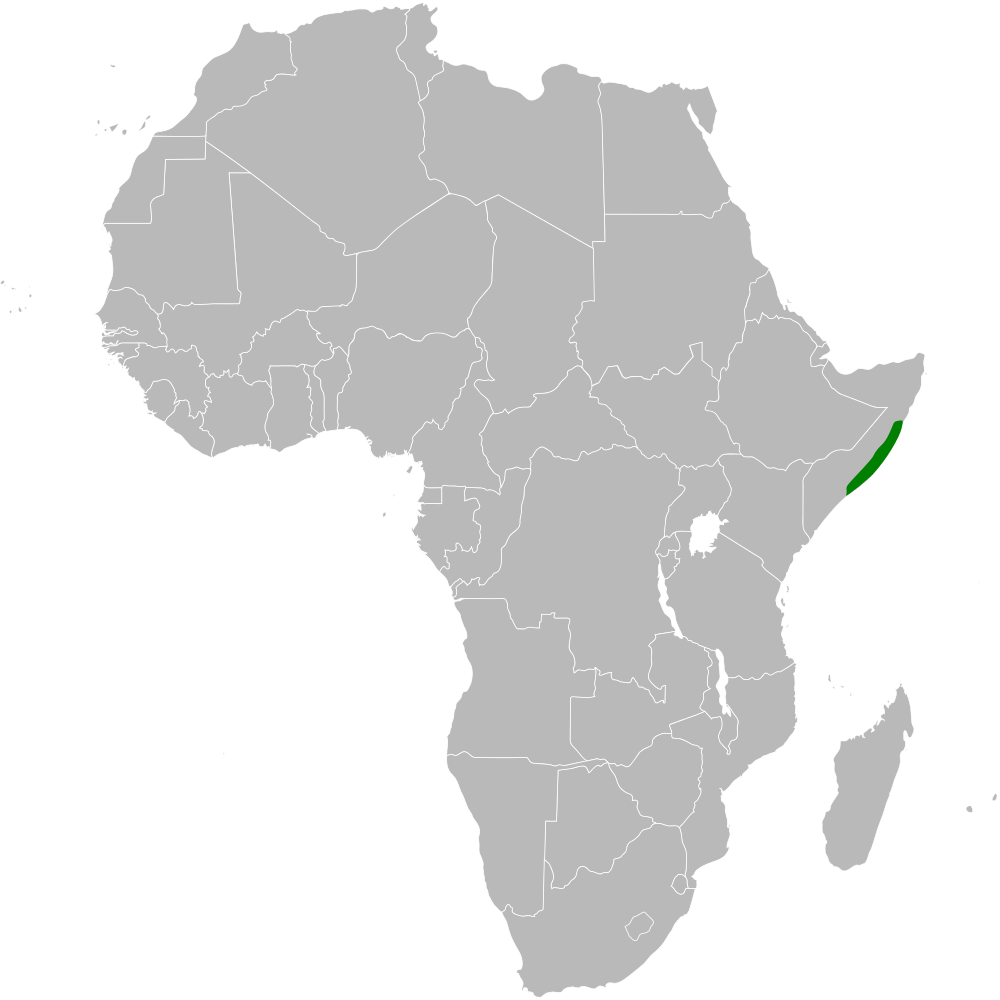
- range

Synonyms
- Calandrella obbiensis

Species of bird

The Obbia lark (Spizocorys obbiensis) is a species of lark in the family Alaudidae. It is found in central Somalia, where it is endemic. Its natural habitat is sub-tropical or tropical dry shrubland.

Formerly or presently, some authorities classified the Obbia lark as belonging to the genus Calandrella.
