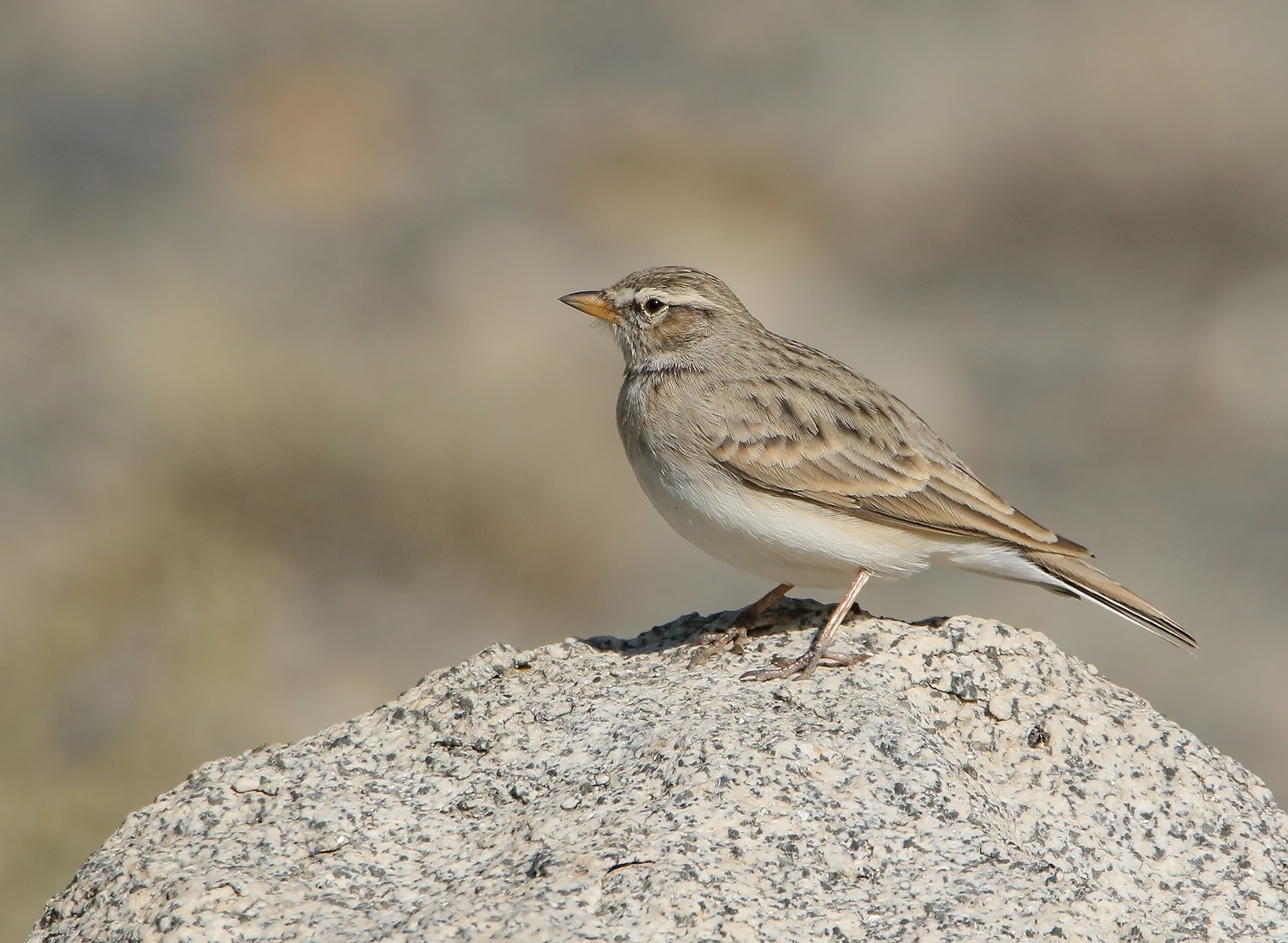
- Hume's short-toed lark, Pakistan

Conservation status
- Least Concern (IUCN 3.1)

Scientific classification
- Kingdom: Animalia
- Phylum: Chordata
- Class: Aves
- Order: Passeriformes
- Family: Alaudidae
- Genus: Calandrella
- Species: C. acutirostris

Binomial name
- Calandrella acutirostris Hume, 1873

Subspecies
- See text
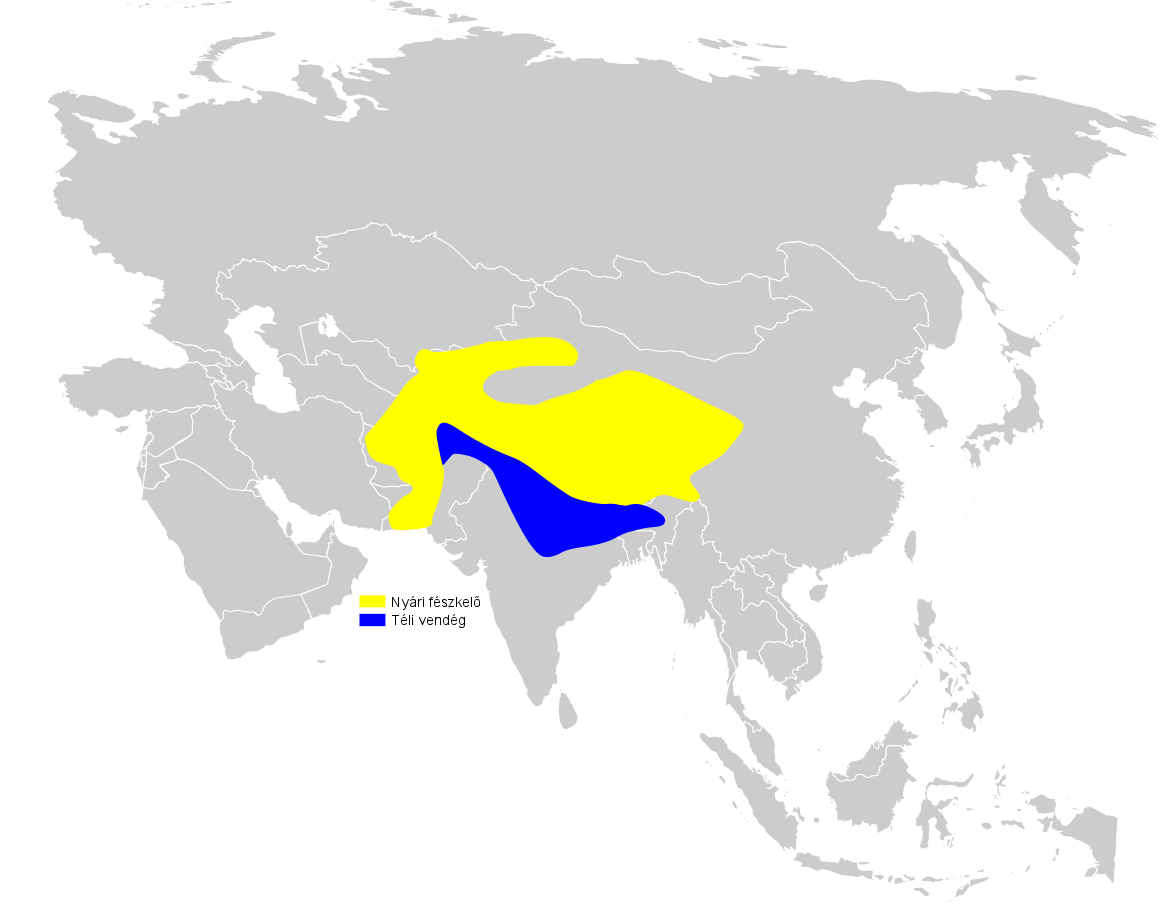
- Range of C. acutirostris Breeding Non-breeding

= Hume's short-toed lark =

Species of bird

Hume's short-toed lark (Calandrella acutirostris) is a species of lark in the family Alaudidae. It is found in south-central Asia from Iran and Kazakhstan to China.

== Taxonomy and systematics ==
The name commemorates the British naturalist Allan Octavian Hume who described the species. The alternate name short-toed lark may also be used for three other species in the genus Calandrella. The alternate name lesser short-toed lark should not be confused with the species of the same name, Alaudala rufescens. Other alternate names for Hume's short-toed lark include Hume's lark and Karakoram short-toed lark.

=== Subspecies ===
Two subspecies are recognized:

- C. a. acutirostris - Hume, 1873: Found from north-eastern Iran and eastern Kazakhstan to western China
- Tibet short-toed lark (C. a. tibetana) - Brooks, WE, 1880: Originally described as a separate species. Found from north-eastern Pakistan to Tibetan Plateau

== Description ==
Hume's short-toed lark is similar in size and appearance to the greater short-toed lark but is generally a duller-looking bird with slightly darker plumage and a slightly smaller beak. As with the greater short-toed lark, the colour varies across the broad range and is not a good distinguishing feature. Hume's short-toed lark grows to a length of from 13 to 14 cm (5.1 to 5.5 in) and the sexes are similar. The crown is brown with slight diffuse streaking, the cheeks are rufous-brown and the supercilium white. The upper parts are greyish-brown or sandy brown with darker streaking, and the upper tail coverts are washed with rufous-brown. The wings are greyish-brown with black barring and pale tips to the feathers. The underparts are mostly whitish, but there is a dark neck patch and a buffish-grey breast band. The breast is unstreaked. The voice helps distinguish this species; vocalisations include a shrill "trree" and a more rolling "drreep".

== Status ==
This species is evaluated as "Least Concern" by the IUCN Red List due to its extensive range, stable population trend, and a population size that is not believed to approach threatened levels.

== Gallery ==
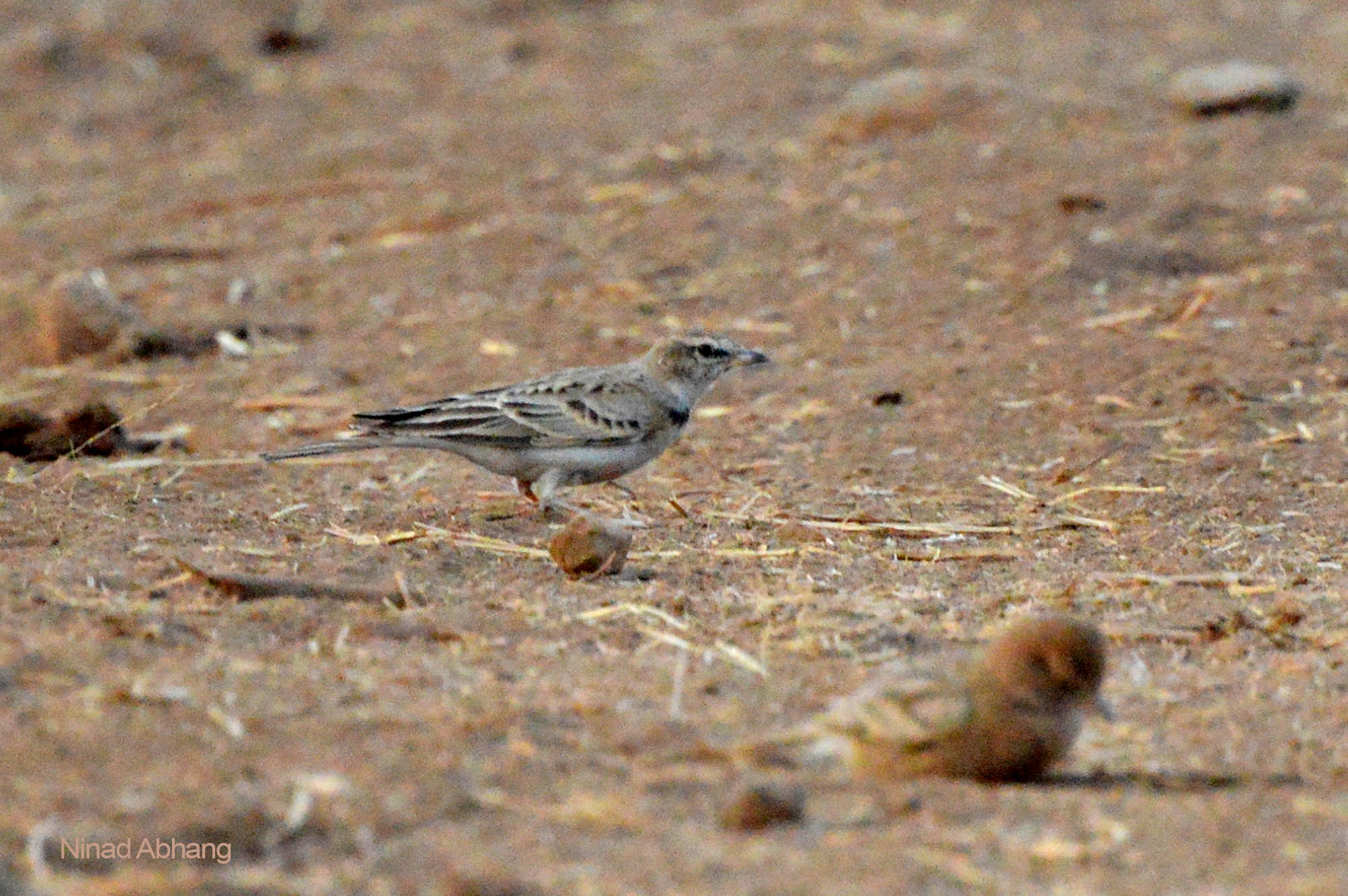
Hume's short-toed lark (Calandrella acutirostris).Amravati, Maharashtra, India.

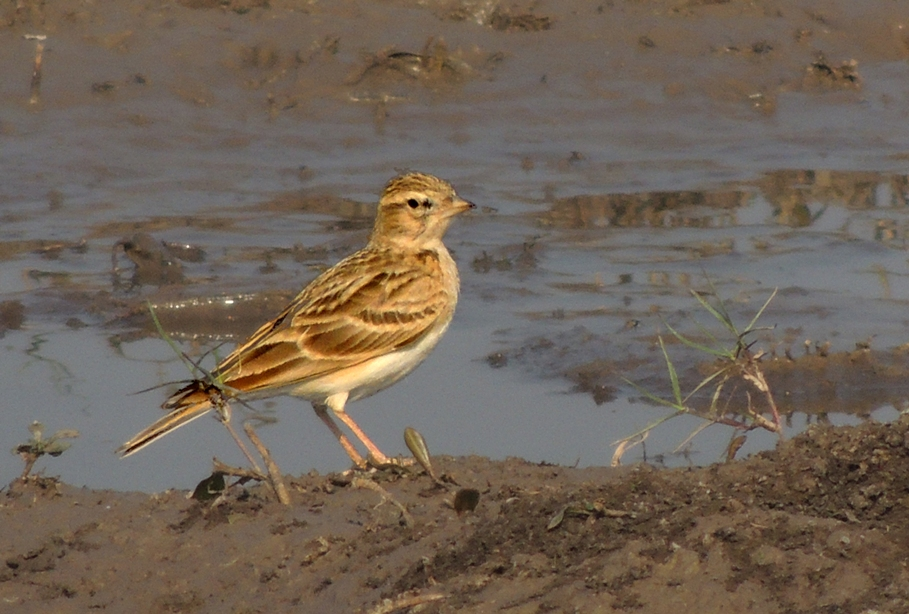
Hume's short-toed lark (Calandrella acutirostris). Akola, Maharashtra, India.

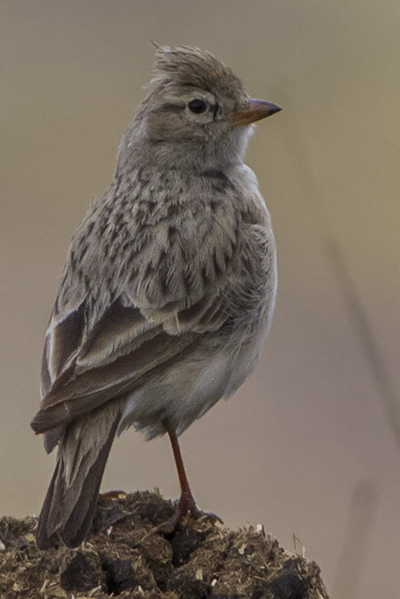
From Laxman chowk, close to Pangolakha Wildlife Sanctuary, Sikkim, India
