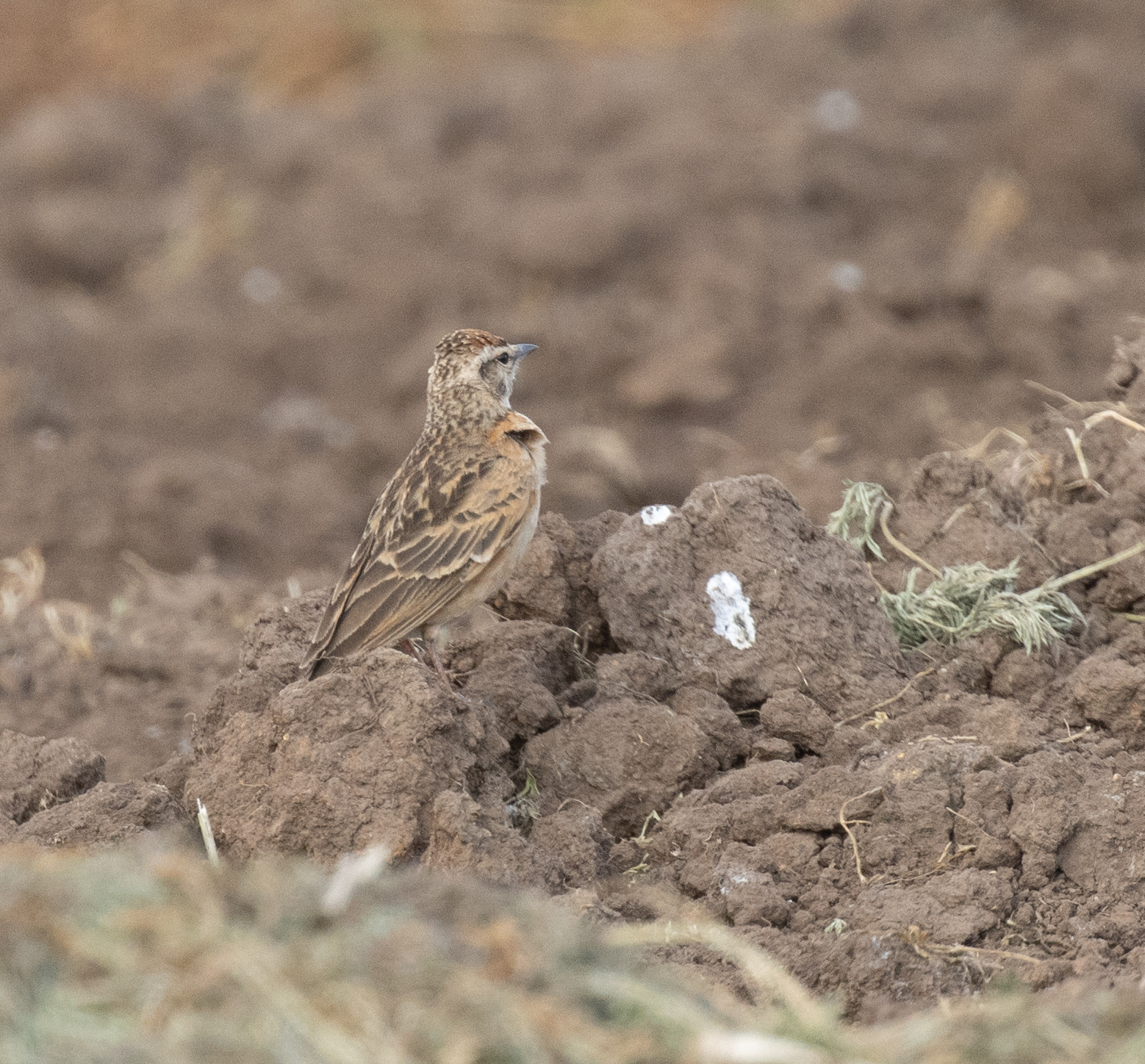

Conservation status
- Least Concern (IUCN 3.1)

Scientific classification
- Kingdom: Animalia
- Phylum: Chordata
- Class: Aves
- Order: Passeriformes
- Family: Alaudidae
- Genus: Calandrella
- Species: C. blanfordi

Binomial name
- Calandrella blanfordi (Shelley, 1902)

Subspecies
- See text
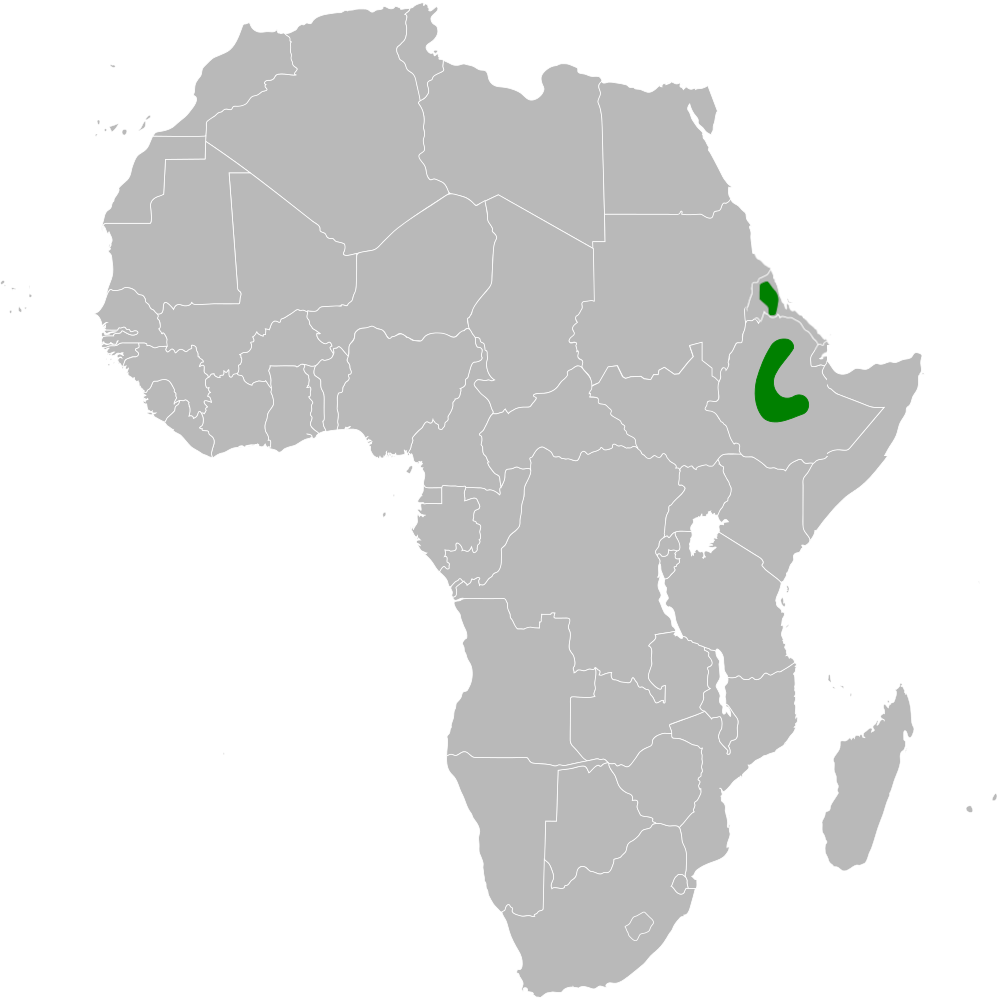

Synonyms
- Calandrella blandfordi; Tephrocorys blanfordi

= Blanford's lark =

Species of bird

Blanford's lark or Blanford's short-toed lark (Calandrella blanfordi) is a small passerine bird of the lark family, Alaudidae, which is native to north-eastern Africa. Its common name commemorates the English zoologist William Thomas Blanford.

== Taxonomy and systematics ==
Blanford's lark was formerly included in either the greater short-toed lark (C. brachydactyla) or the red-capped lark (C. cinerea) but is now commonly treated as a separate species. Alternate names for Blanford's lark include Blandford's lark, Blandford's short-toed lark and Blanford's red-capped lark.

=== Subspecies ===
Two subspecies are recognized:

- Calandrella blanfordi blanfordi - (Shelley, 1902): Found in northern Eritrea
- Calandrella blanfordi erlangeri - Erlanger's lark- (Neumann, 1906): Found in Ethiopia

== Description ==
Blanford's lark is 14–15 centimetres long. The upperparts are pale sandy-brown with some darker streaking and the crown is rufous. The underparts are pale and plain apart from a small dark patch on the side of the neck made up of vertical streaks. The greater short-toed lark is similar but has a greyer, more-streaked crown. Erlanger's and red-capped larks have darker upperparts with more streaking and a darker rufous crown. Erlanger's lark has larger dark neck-patches while in red-capped lark the patches are rufous.

Blanford's lark has a sparrow-like flight-call. The song is given in a circular song-flight and includes a mixture of chew-chew-chew-chew notes and fluid phrases.

== Habitat and movements ==
They occur on open stony plains, often with bushes. In Arabia, it breeds between 1800 and 2500 metres above sea-level with some birds dispersing to lower ground in winter. The species is often seen in flocks outside the breeding season.
