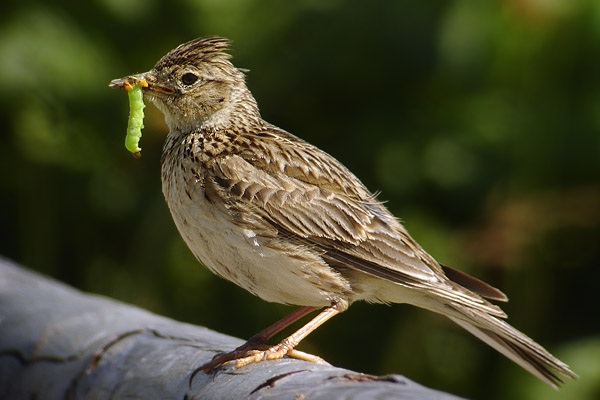
- Eurasian skylark (Alauda arvensis) Song of Eurasian skylark

Scientific classification
- Kingdom: Animalia
- Phylum: Chordata
- Class: Aves
- Order: Passeriformes
- Family: Alaudidae
- Genus: Alauda; Linnaeus, 1758

Type species
- Alauda arvensis Linnaeus, 1758

Species
- see text

= Alauda =

Genus of birds

Alauda is a genus of larks found across much of Europe, Asia and in the mountains of north Africa, with one species (the Raso lark) endemic to the islet of Raso in the Cape Verde Islands. At least two additional species are known from the fossil record. The genus name is from Latin alauda, "lark". Pliny the Elder thought the word was originally of Celtic origin.

== Taxonomy and systematics ==
The genus Alauda was introduced by the Swedish naturalist Carl Linnaeus in 1758 in the tenth edition of his Systema Naturae. The type species was subsequently designated as the Eurasian skylark.

The genus Alauda has four extant and at least two extinct species. Formerly, many other species have also been considered to belong to the genus; Linnaeus originally also included pipits and the eastern meadowlark in the genus. As the first lark genus described, numerous other larks were also first described as species of Alauda before being transferred to new genera from the early 19th century onwards.

=== Extant species ===
The genus contains four species:

| Image | Scientific name | Common name | Distribution |
|---|---|---|---|
| | Alauda leucoptera | White-winged lark | southern Ukraine through Kazakhstan to south-central Russia |
| | Alauda razae | Raso lark | Raso islet in the Cape Verde Islands |
| | Alauda gulgula | Oriental skylark | southern, central and eastern Asia |
| | Alauda arvensis | Eurasian skylark | across Europe and Asia |

=== Extinct species ===
- †Alauda xerarvensis (late Pliocene of Varshets, Bulgaria)
- †Alauda tivadari (late Miocene of Polgardi, Hungary)
