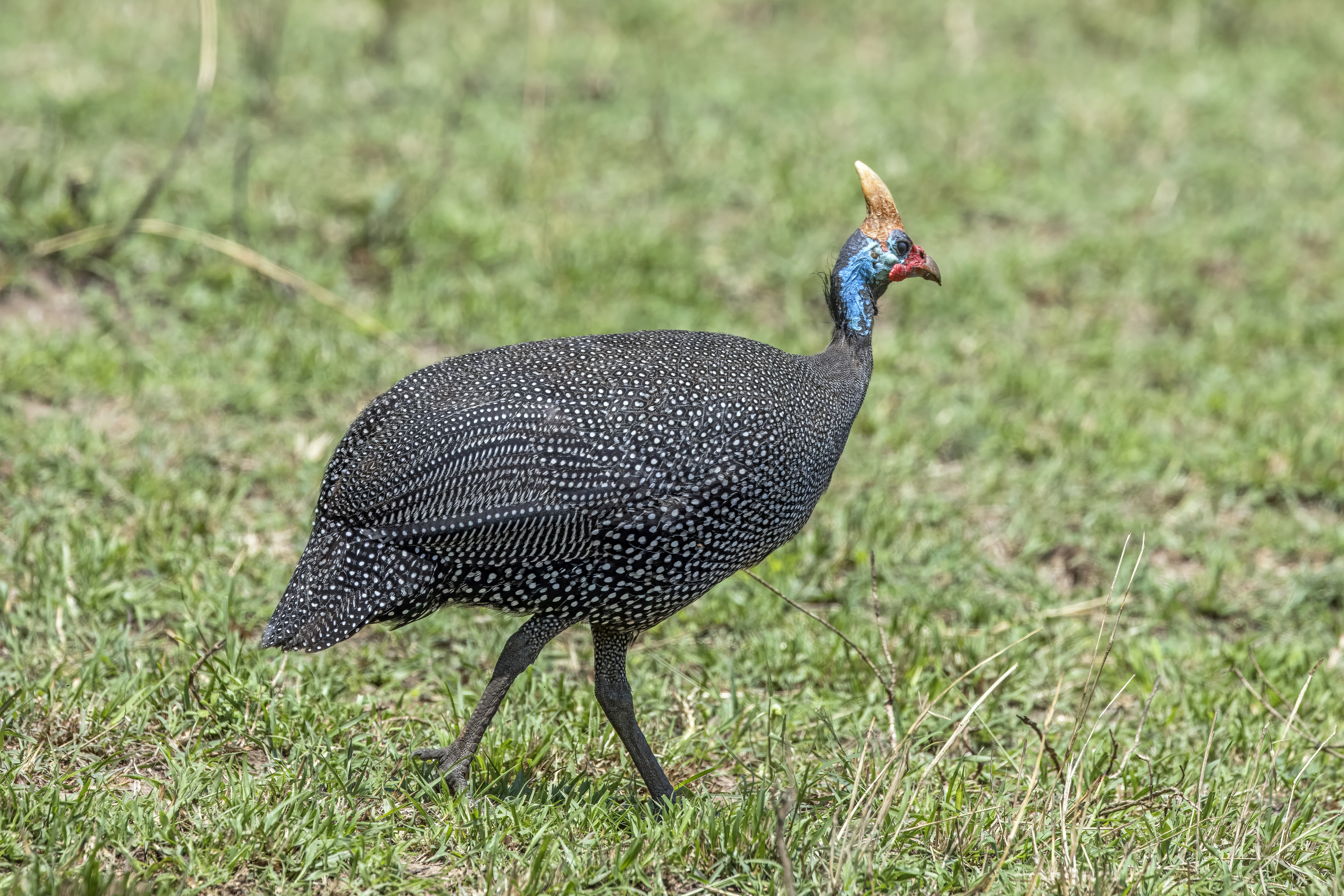
- N. m. reichenowi Serengeti National Park, Tanzania

Conservation status
- Least Concern (IUCN 3.1)

Scientific classification
- Kingdom: Animalia
- Phylum: Chordata
- Class: Aves
- Order: Galliformes
- Family: Numididae
- Genus: Numida; Linnaeus, 1764
- Species: N. meleagris

Binomial name
- Numida meleagris (Linnaeus, 1758)
- IUCN range (2018) Extant (resident) Extant and introduced (resident) Possibly extinct & reintroduced Introduced to Western Cape, Madagascar and elsewhere.

Synonyms
- Phasianus meleagris Linnaeus, 1758; Crax meleagris Linnaeus, 1758

= Helmeted guinea fowl =

Species of bird

Calls of domesticated hens

The helmeted guinea fowl (Numida meleagris) is the best known of the guinea fowl bird family, Numididae, and the only member of the genus Numida. It is native to Africa, mainly south of the Sahara, and has been widely introduced, as a domesticated species, into the West Indies, North America, Colombia, Brazil, Australia and Europe.

== Taxonomy ==
The helmeted guinea fowl was formally described by Swedish naturalist Carl Linnaeus in 1758 in the tenth edition of his Systema Naturae under the binomial name Phasianus meleagris. In 1764, Linnaeus moved the helmeted guinea fowl to the new genus Numida. The genus name Numida is Latin for "North African".

In the early days of the European colonisation of North America, the native wild turkey (Meleagris gallopavo) was confused with this species. The word meleagris, Greek for guinea fowl, is also shared in the scientific names of the two species, though for the guinea fowl it is the species name, whereas for the turkey, it is the name of the genus and, in inflected form, the former family, Meleagridididae.

=== Subspecies ===
The nine recognised subspecies are:

Image	Subspecies	Common name	Range
	N. m. coronata (Gurney, 1868)	Gurney's helmeted guinea fowl	The type locality is restricted to Uitenhage; it occurs in eastern and central South Africa and western Eswatini.
	N. m. galeatus (Pallas, 1767)	West African guinea fowl	western Africa to southern Chad, central Zaire, and northern Angola
	N. m. marungensis (Schalow, 1884)	Marungu helmeted guinea fowl	south Congo Basin to western Angola and Zambia
	N. m. meleagris (Linnaeus, 1758)	Saharan helmeted guinea fowl	eastern Chad to Ethiopia, northern Zaire, Uganda and northern Kenya
	N. m. mitrata (Pallas, 1764)	tufted guinea fowl	Terra Typica "Madagascar" (introduced or erroneous). Occurs in Tanzania to Zambia, Botswana, northern South Africa, eastern Eswatini and Mozambique.
	N. m. damarensis (Roberts, 1917)	Damara helmeted guinea fowl	Terra Typica: Windhoek. Occurs from arid southern Angola to northern Namibia and Botswana north of 26°S
	N. m. papillosus Reichenow, A 1894	arid helmeted guineafowl	south Angola to central Namibia and Botswana
	N. m. reichenowi (Ogilvie-Grant, 1894)	Reichenow's helmeted guinea fowl	Kenya and central Tanzania
	N. m. sabyi (Hartert, 1919)	Saby's helmeted guinea fowl	northwestern Morocco
	N. m. somaliensis (Neumann, 1899)	Somali tufted guinea fowl	northeastern Ethiopia and Somalia

== Description ==
The helmeted guinea fowl is a large, 53 to 58 cm (21 to 23 in) bird with a round body and small head. They weigh about 1.3 kg (2.9 lb). The body plumage is gray-black speckled with white. Like other guinea fowl, this species has an unfeathered head, which in this species is decorated with a dull yellow or reddish bony knob, and bare skin with red, blue, or black hues. The wings are short and rounded, and the tail is likewise short. Various subspecies are proposed, differences in appearance being mostly a large variation in shape, size, and colour of the casque and facial wattles.

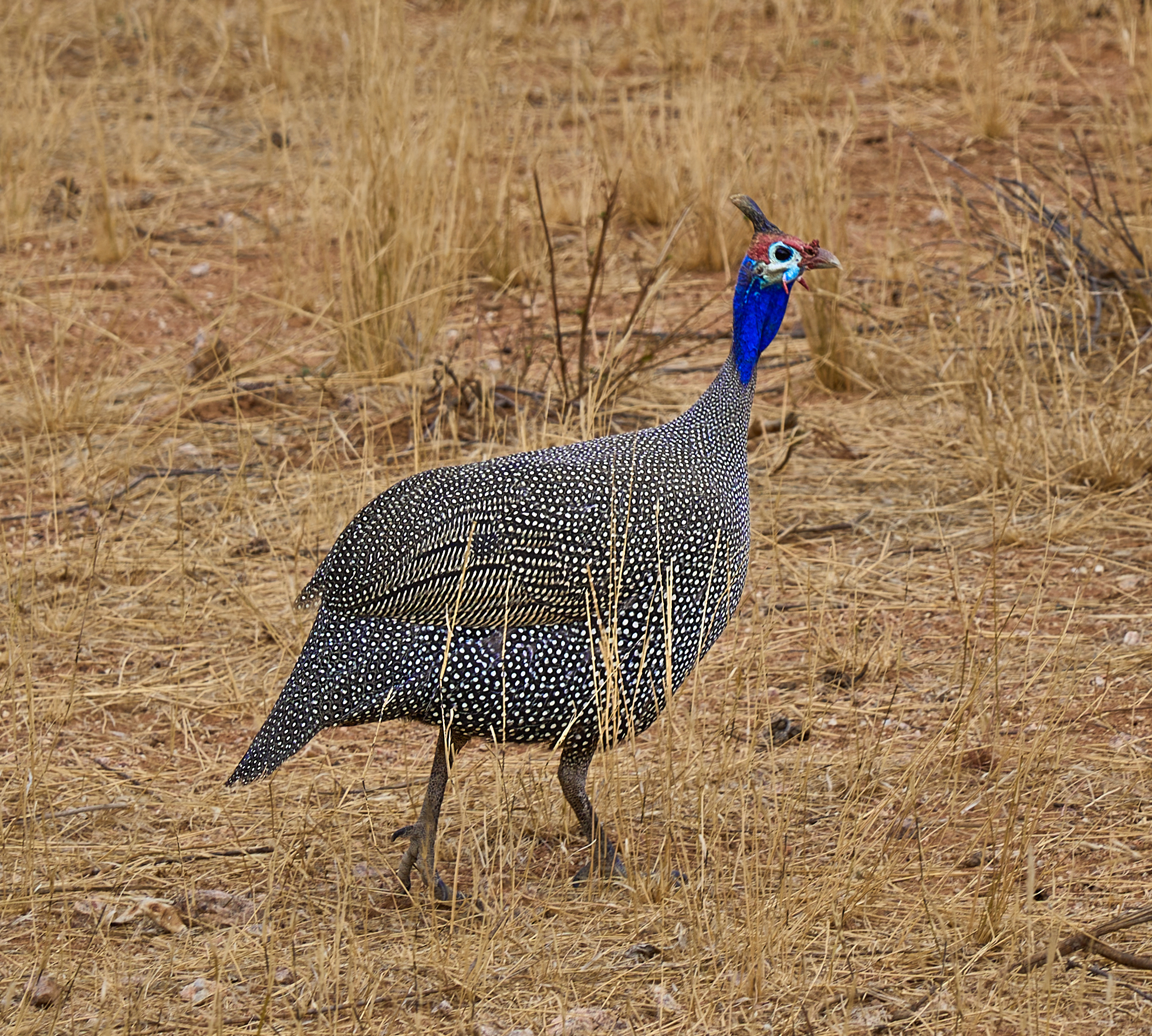
N. m. papillosus

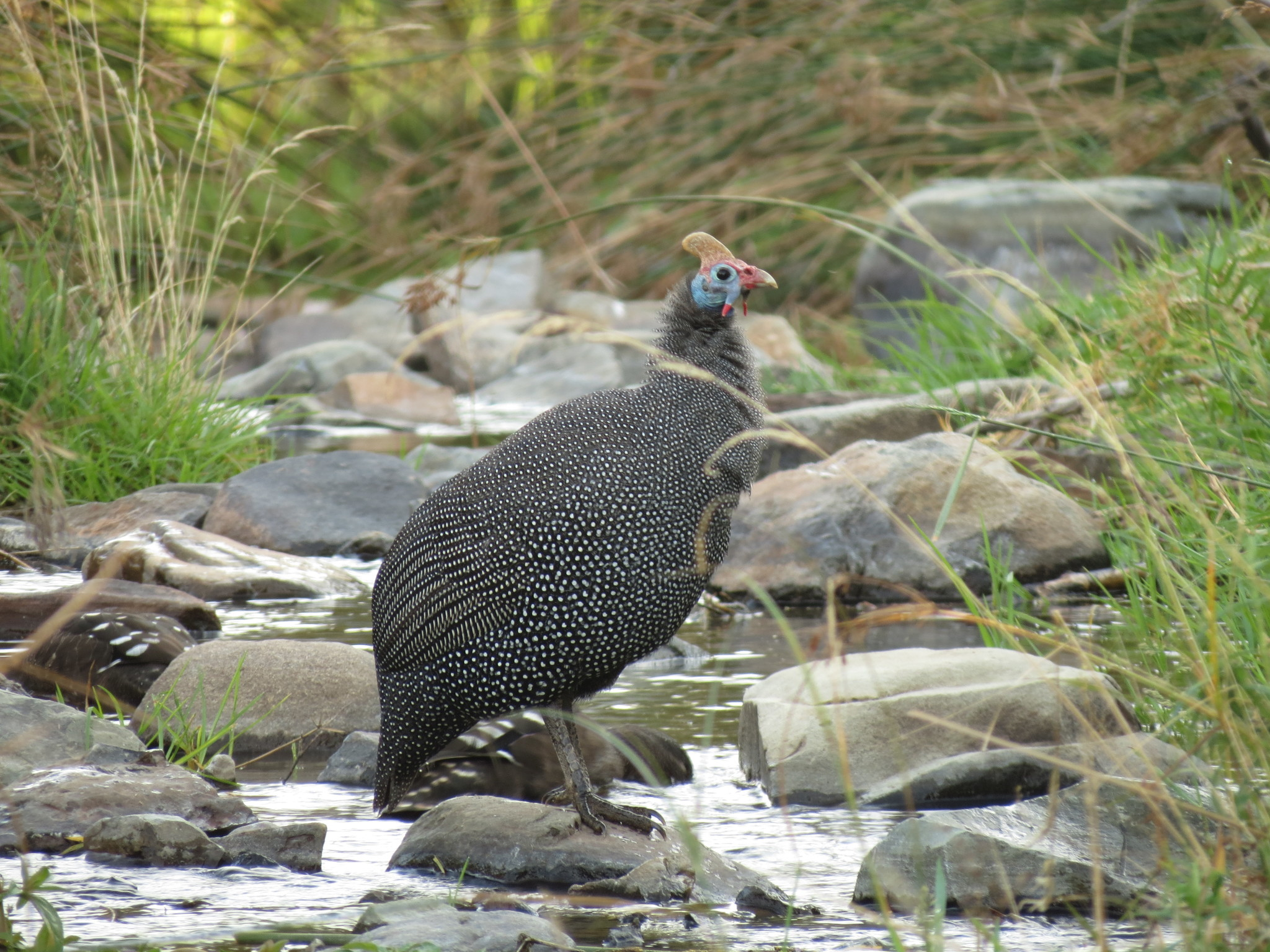
N. m. coronatus

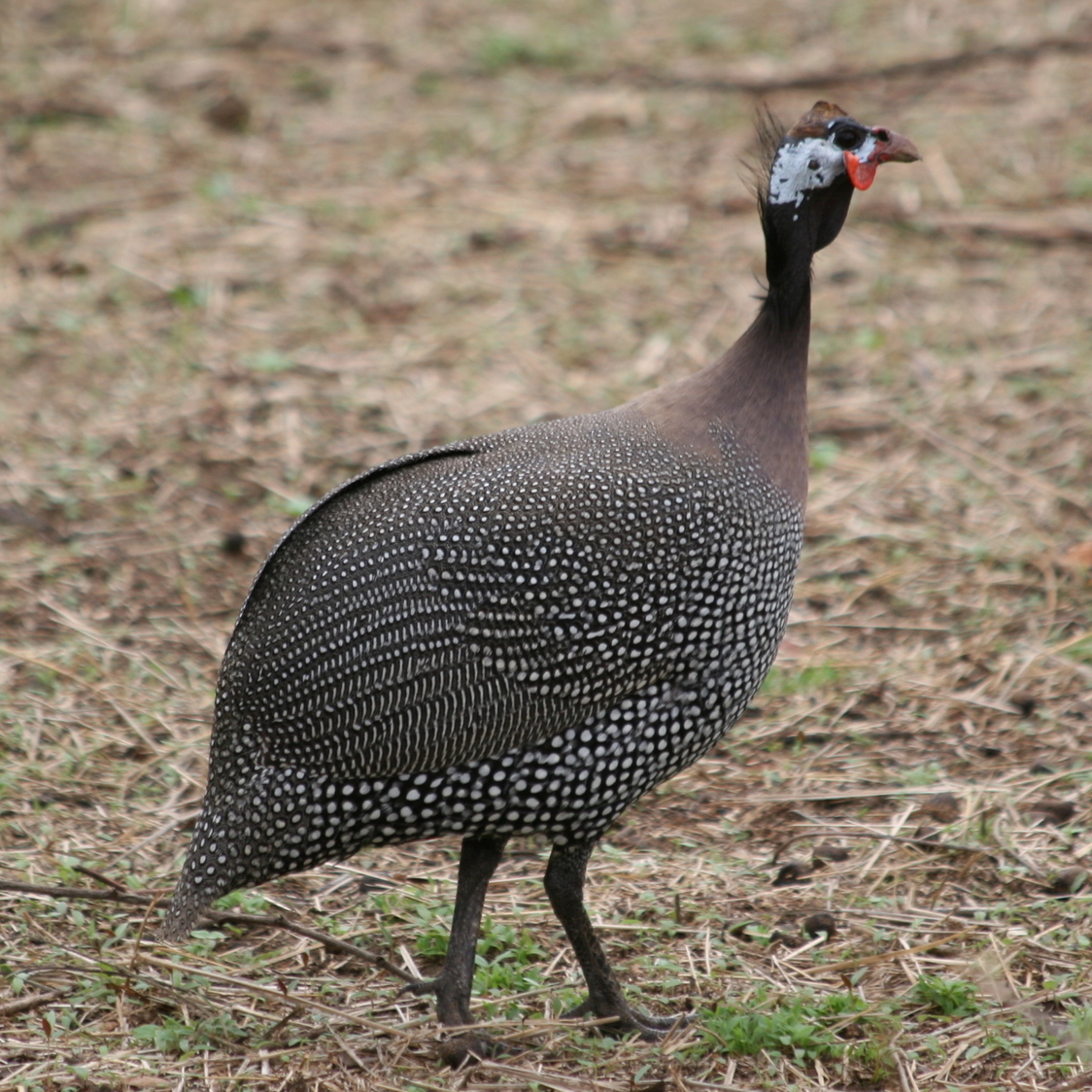
N. m. galeatus

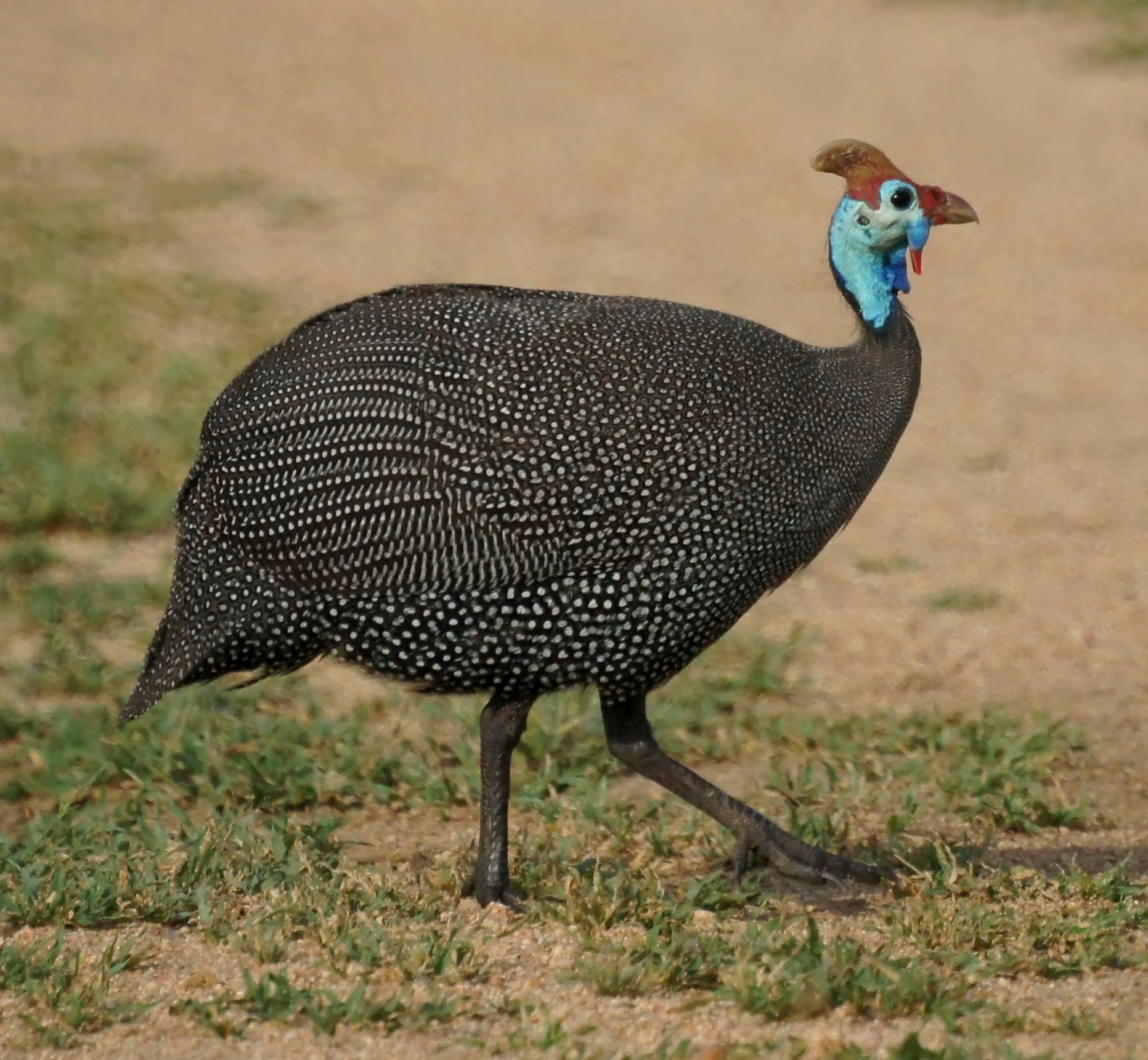
N. m. mitratus

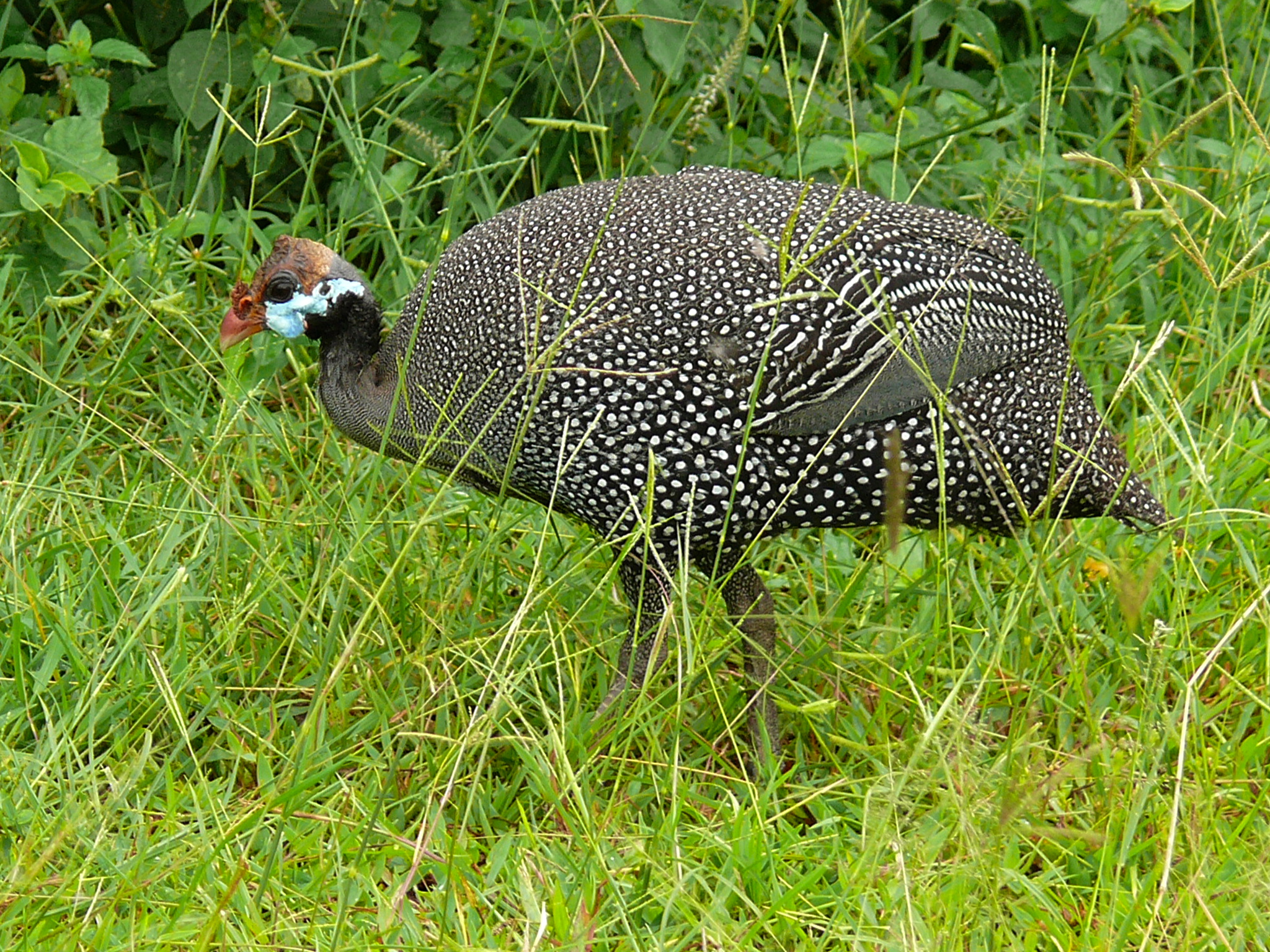
N. m. meleagris

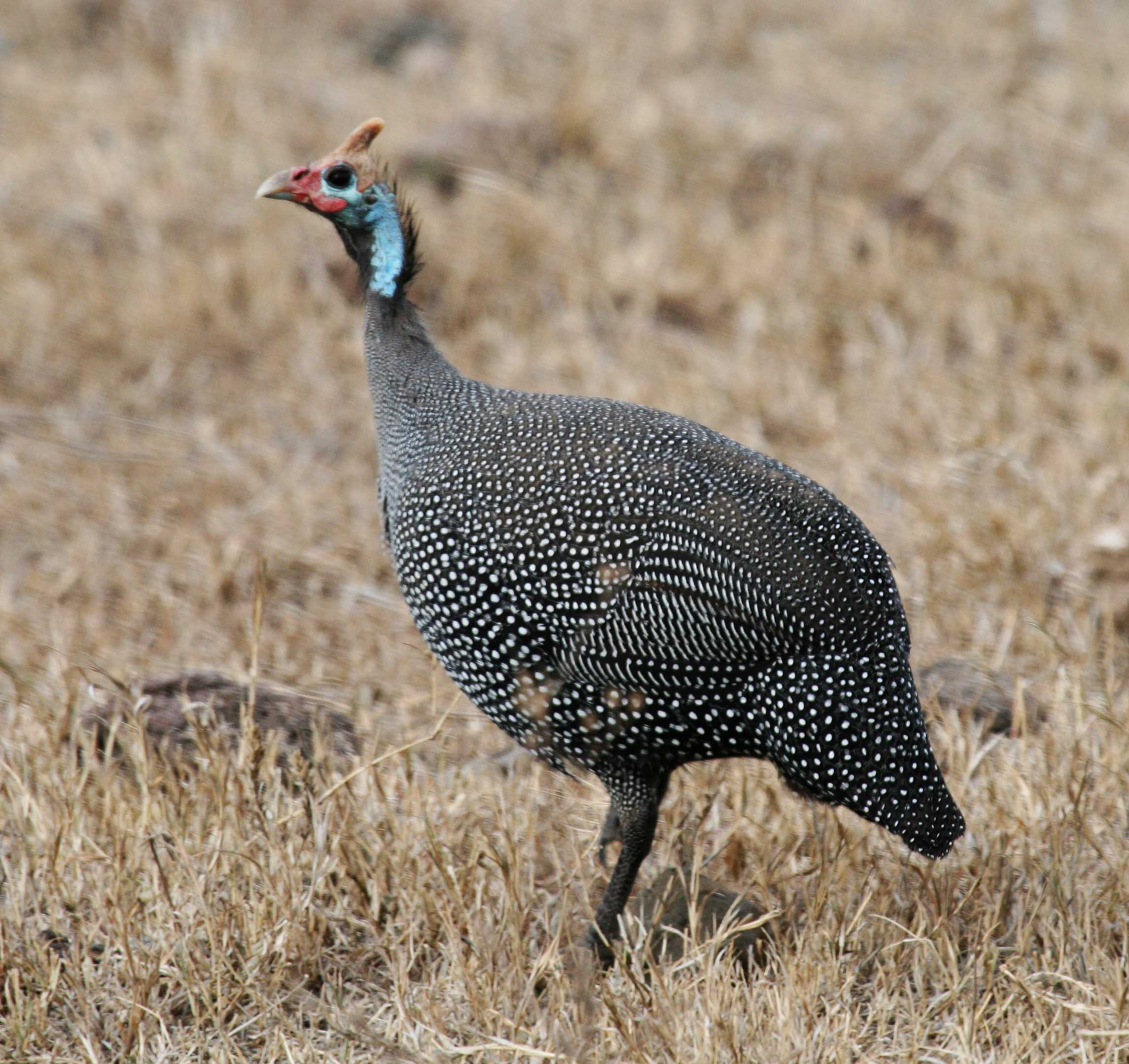
N. m. reichenowi

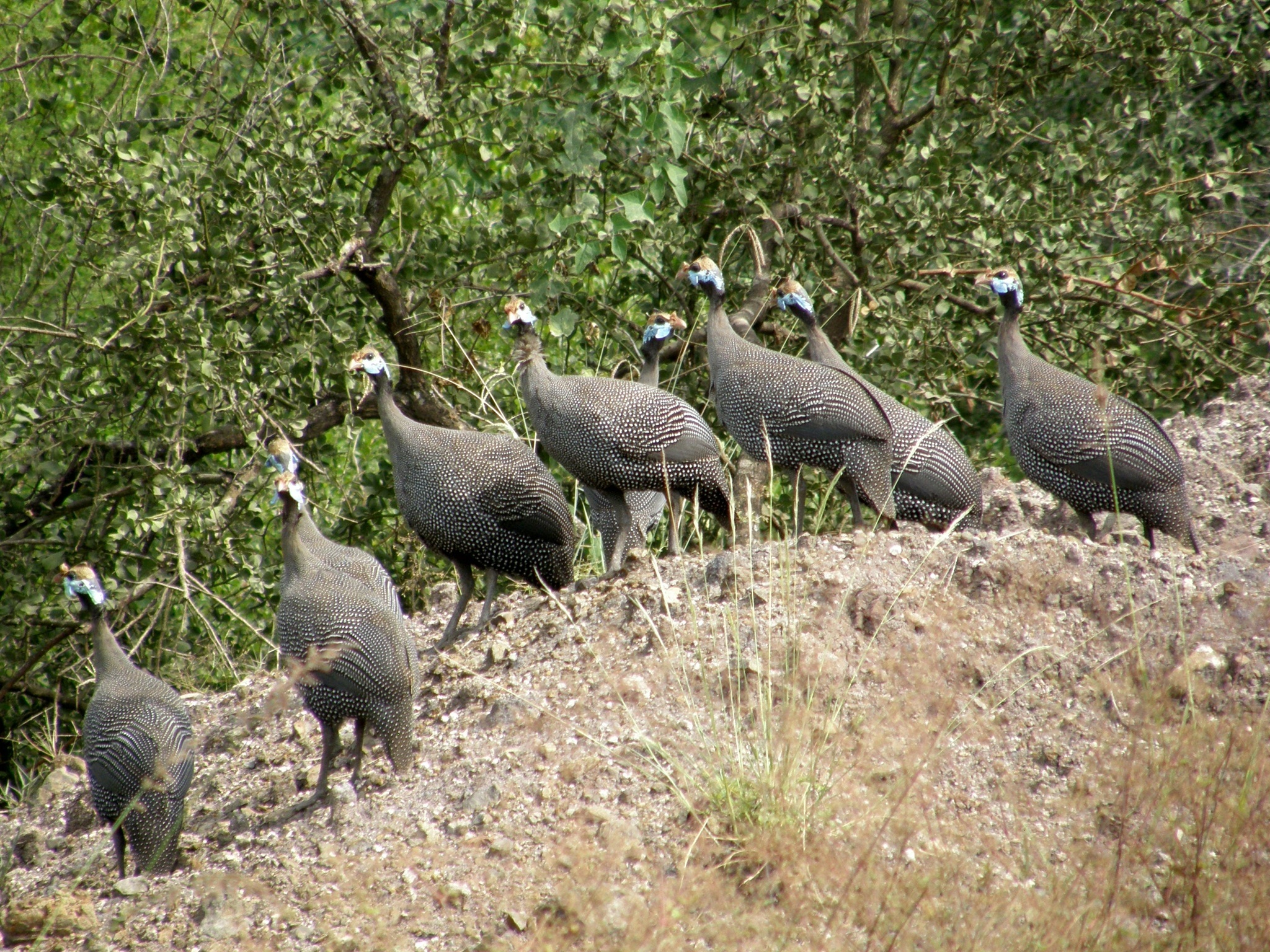
N. m. somaliensis

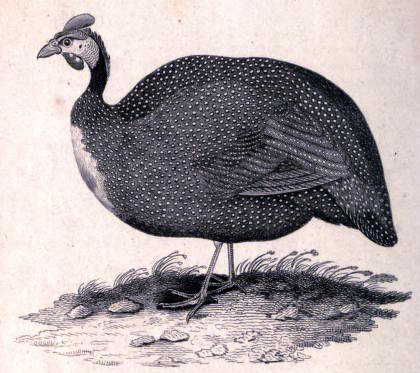
The likely extinct subspecies N. m. sabyi of Morocco

== Behaviour and ecology ==
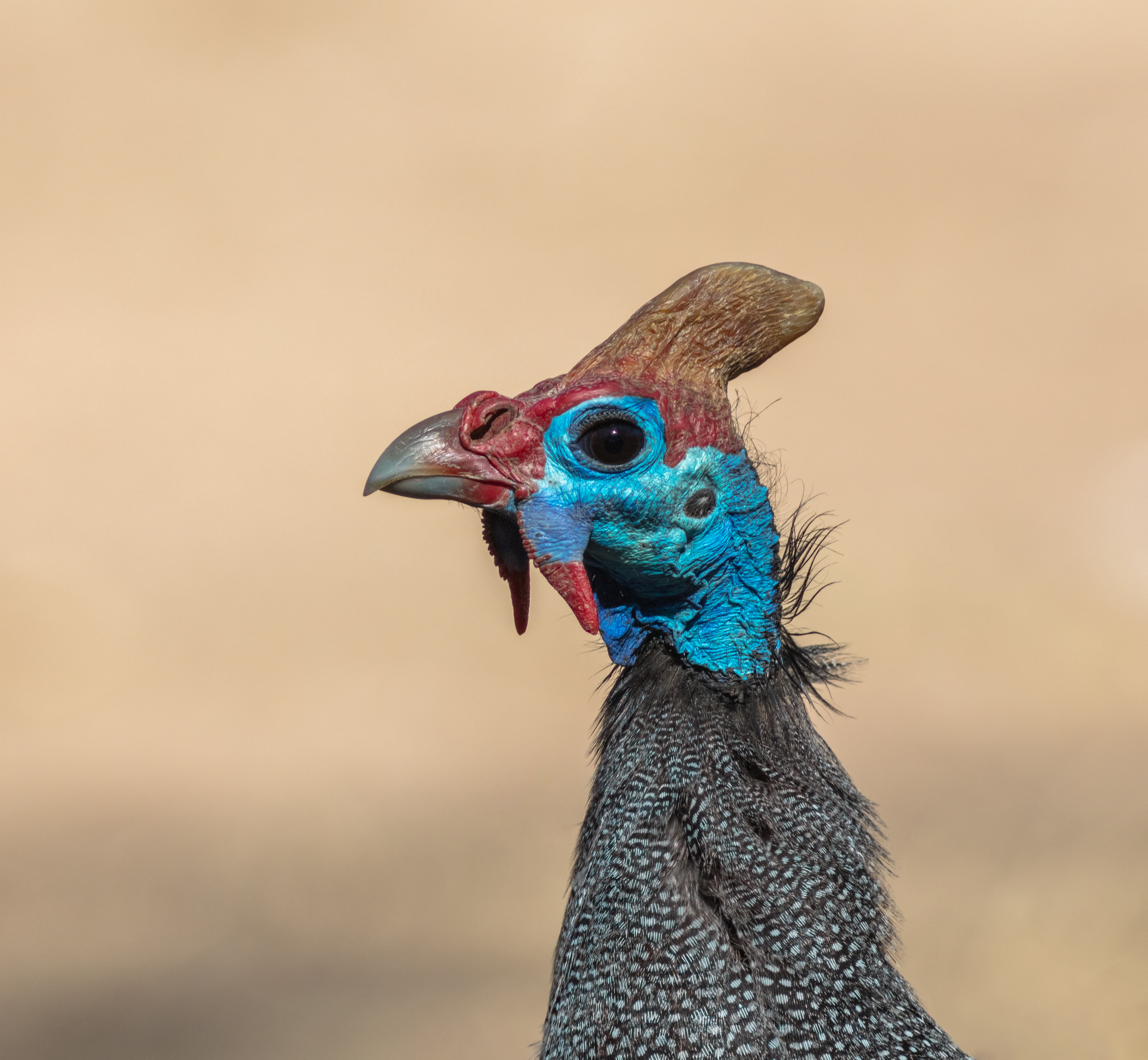
Closeup of N. m. mitratus, in South Africa

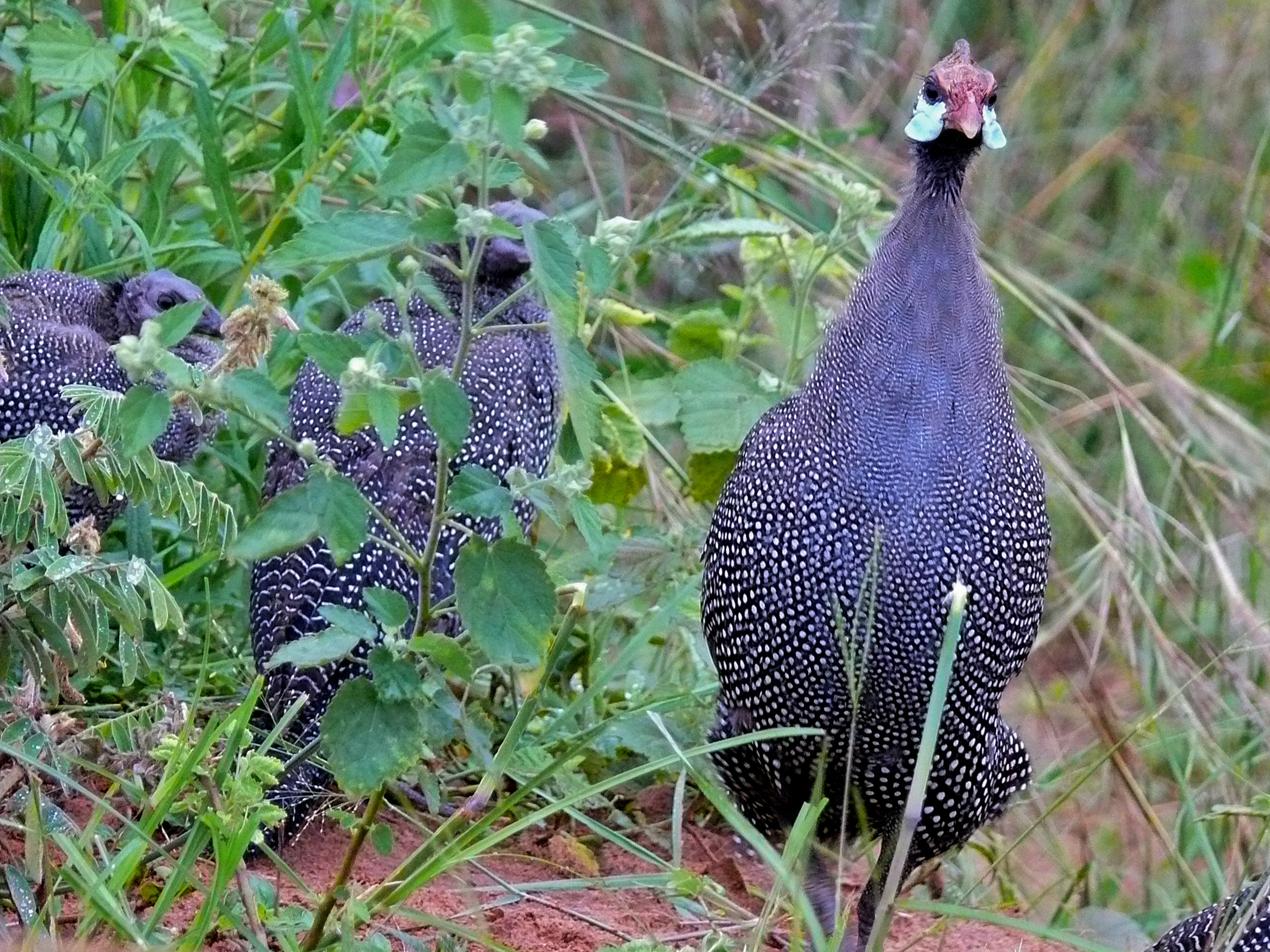
A covey of the nominate race in Uganda

This is a gregarious species, forming flocks outside the breeding season typically of about 25 birds that also roost communally. Guinea fowl are particularly well-suited to consuming massive quantities of ticks, which might otherwise spread Lyme disease. These birds are terrestrial, and prone to run rather than fly when alarmed. Like most gallinaceous birds, they have a short-lived, explosive flight and rely on gliding to cover extended distances. Helmeted guinea fowl can walk 10 km and more in a day. Their bodies are well-suited for running and they are remarkably successful in maintaining dynamic stability over rough terrain at speed. They make loud harsh calls when disturbed.

Their diet consists of a variety of animal and plant foods. During the nonbreeding season, N. meleagris consumes corns, tubers, and seeds, particularly of agricultural weeds, as well as various agricultural crop spillage. During the breeding season, more than 80% of their diet may be invertebrates, particularly arthropods such as beetles. Guinea fowl are equipped with strong claws and scratch in loose soil for food much like domestic chickens, although they seldom uproot growing plants in so doing. As with all of the Numididae, they have no spurs. They may live for up to 12 years in the wild.

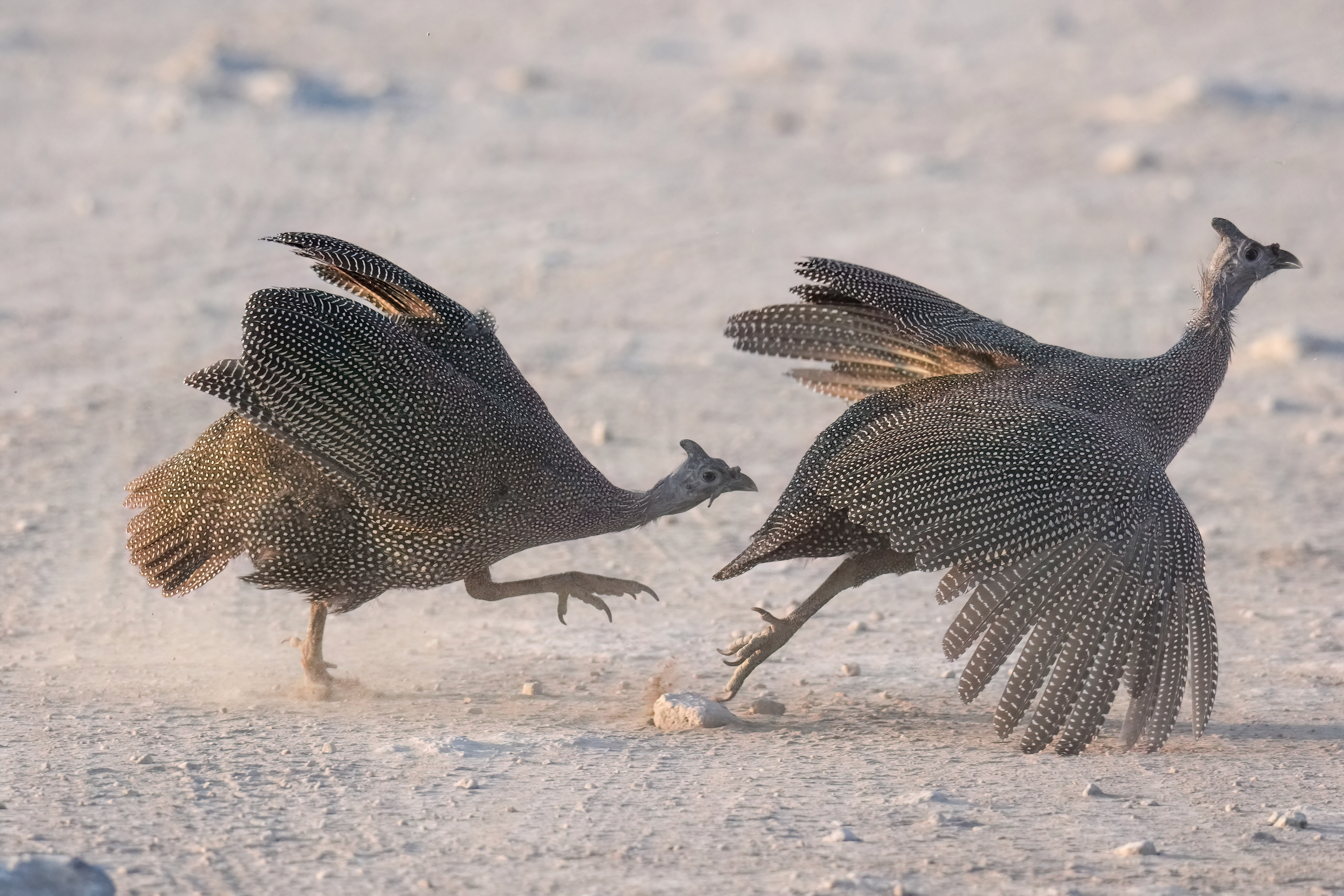
Damara helmeted guinea fowl fighting in Etosha National Park, Namibia

Males often show aggression towards each other, and partake in aggressive fighting, which may leave other males bloodied and otherwise injured. They attempt to make themselves look more fearsome by raising their wings upwards from their sides and bristling their feathers across the length of their bodies, and they may also rush towards their opponent with a gaping beak. The nest is a well-hidden, generally unlined scrape, and a clutch is normally some 6 to 12 eggs, which the female incubates for 26 to 28 days. Nests containing larger numbers of eggs are generally believed to be the result of more than one hen using the nest; eggs are large, and an incubating bird could not realistically cover significantly more than a normal clutch.

Domesticated birds, at least, are notable for producing very thick-shelled eggs that are reduced to fragments as the young birds (known as keets among bird breeders) hatch, rather than leaving two large sections and small chips where the keet has removed the end of the egg. Domesticated guinea hens are not the best of mothers, and often abandon their nests. The keets are cryptically coloured, and rapid wing growth enables them to flutter onto low branches barely a week after hatching.

== Reproduction ==
Helmeted guinea fowl are seasonal breeders. Summer is the peak breeding season in which the testes could weigh up to 1.6 g, while during winter no breeding activity takes place. The serum testosterone level is up to 5.37 ng/ml during the breeding season.

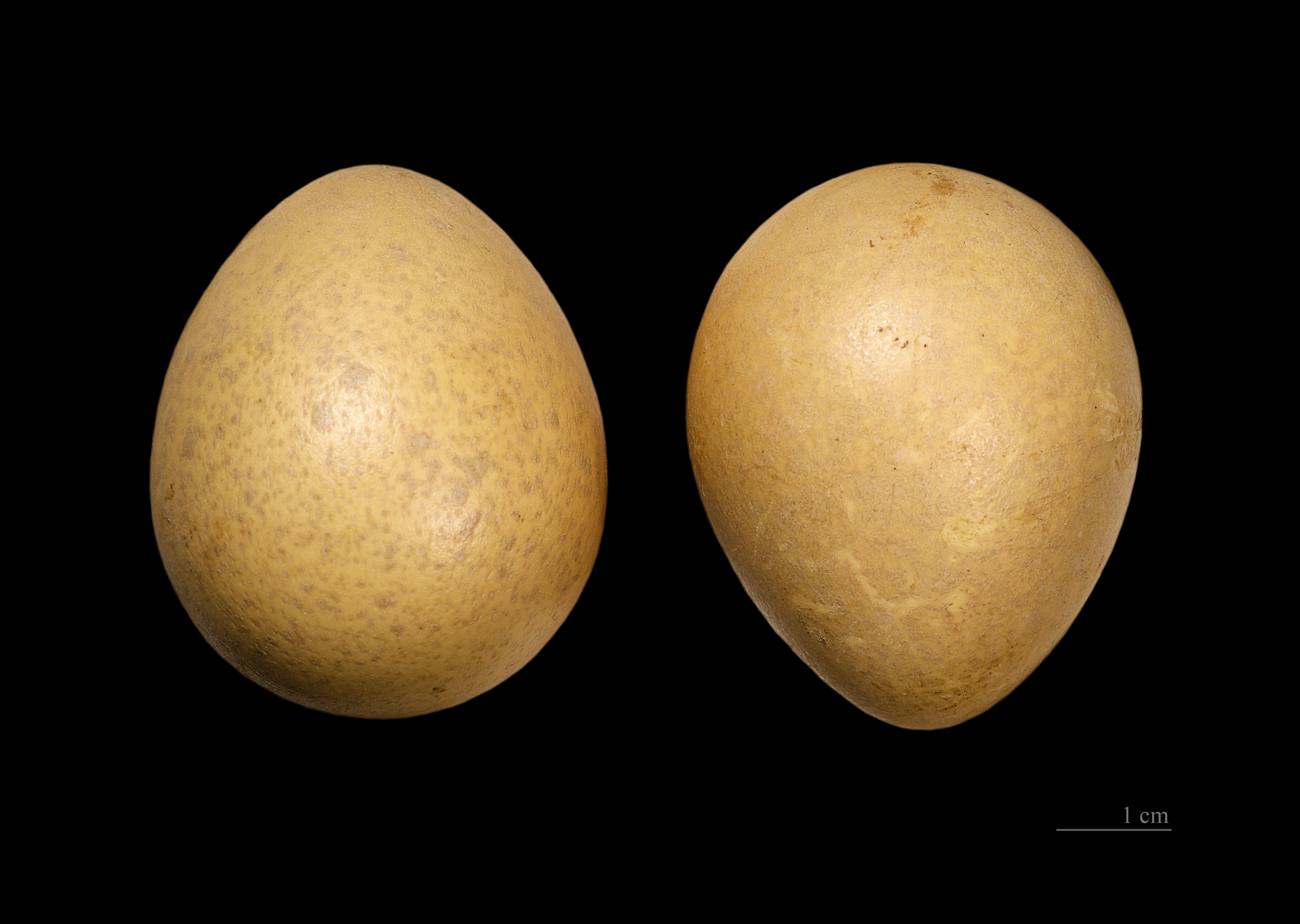
Eggs

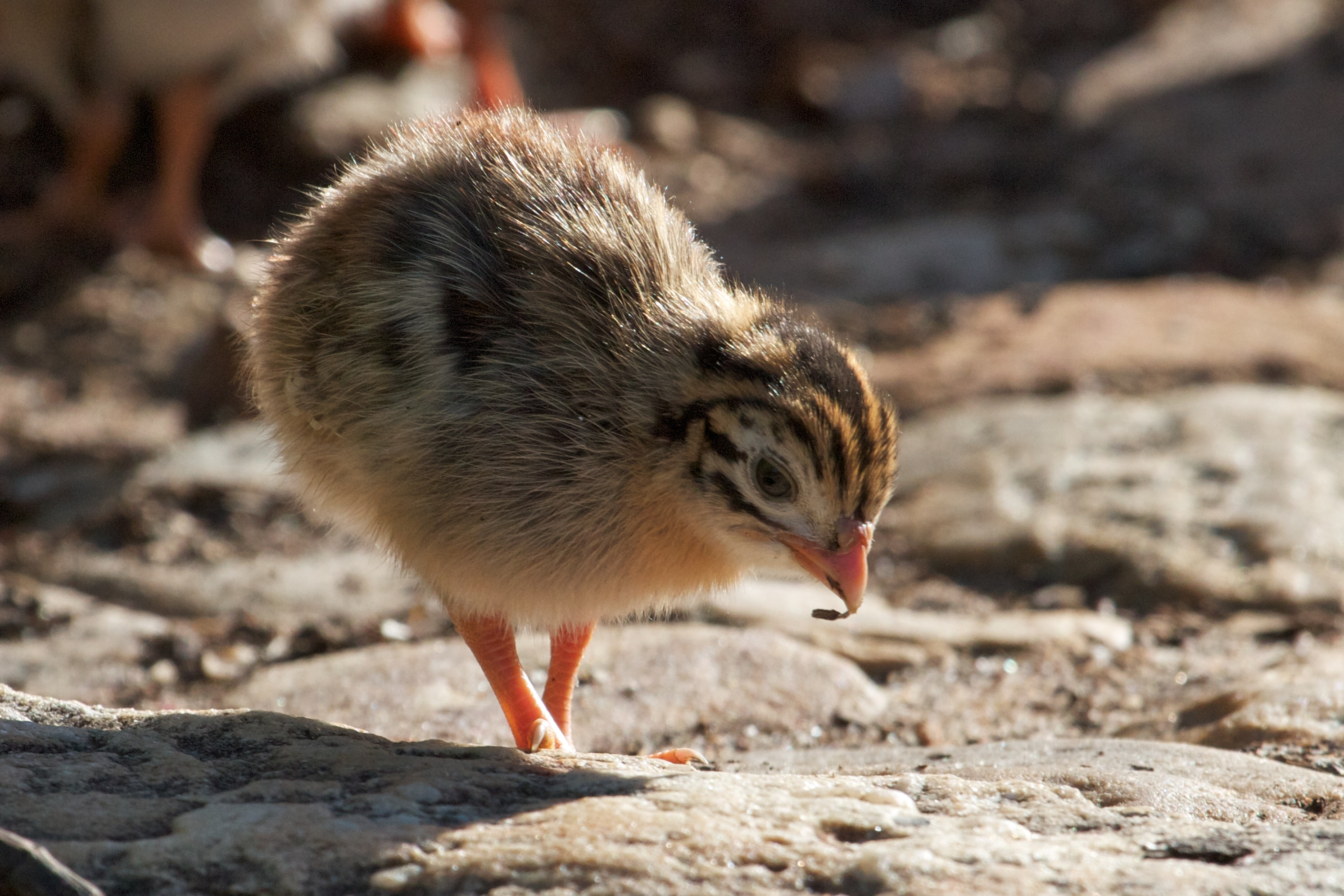
Keet, in Cape Town, South Africa

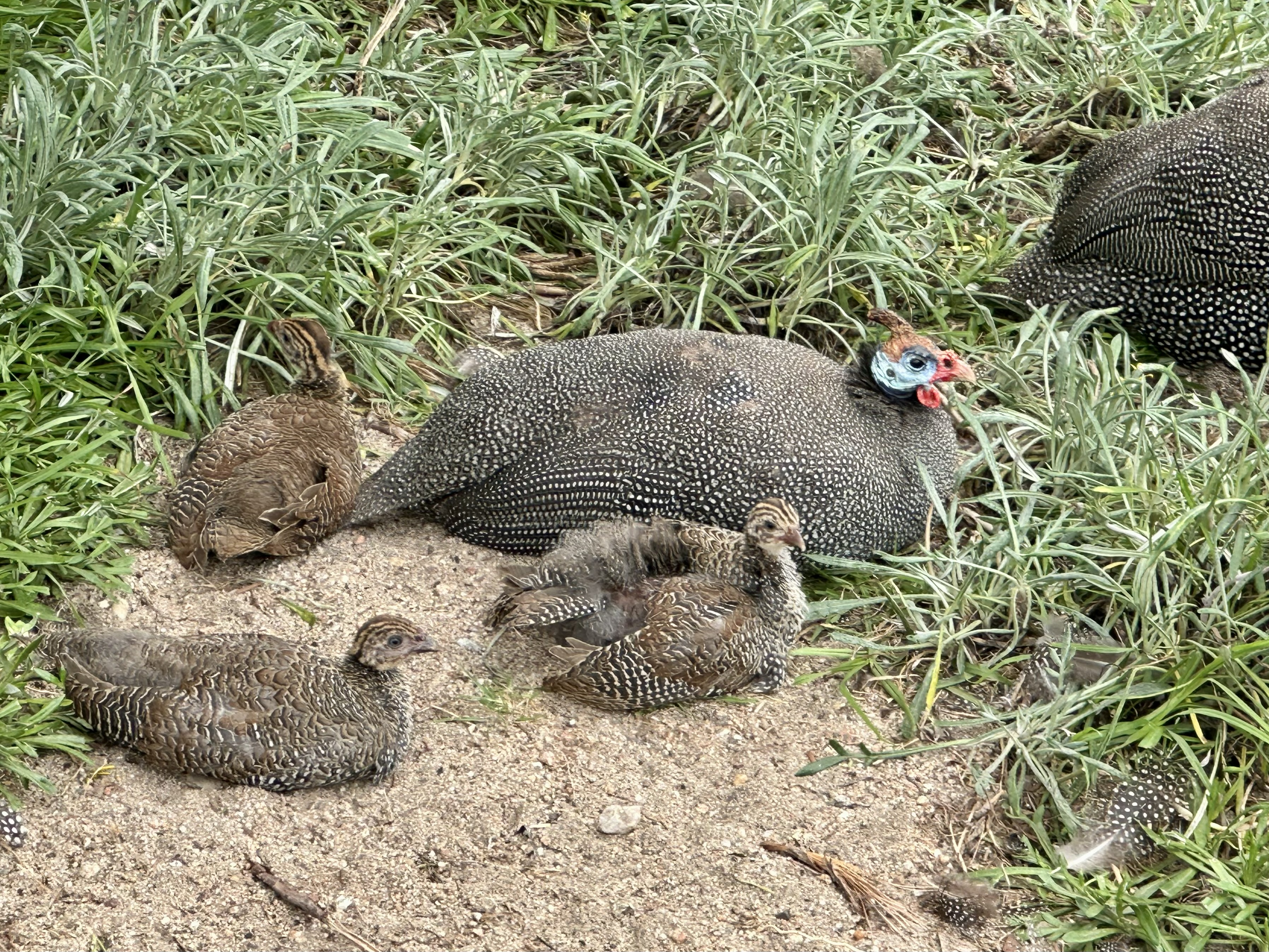
With three chicks in Swakopmund, Namibia

== Habitat ==
They breed in warm, fairly dry and open habitats with scattered shrubs and trees such as savanna or farmland.

== Domestication ==
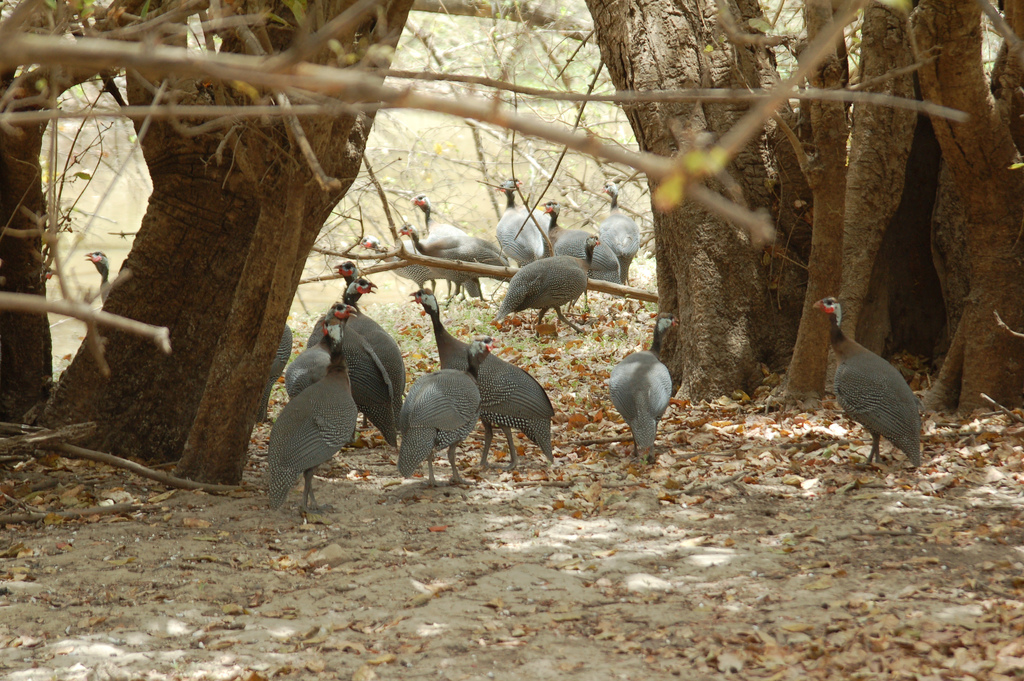
Race N. m. galeatus, here seen wild in Niger, is popularly kept as free-ranging poultry.

Helmeted guinea fowl are often domesticated, and it is this species that is sold in Western supermarkets. Feral populations descended from domestic flocks are now widely distributed and occur in the West Indies, North America, South America, Australia and Europe.
