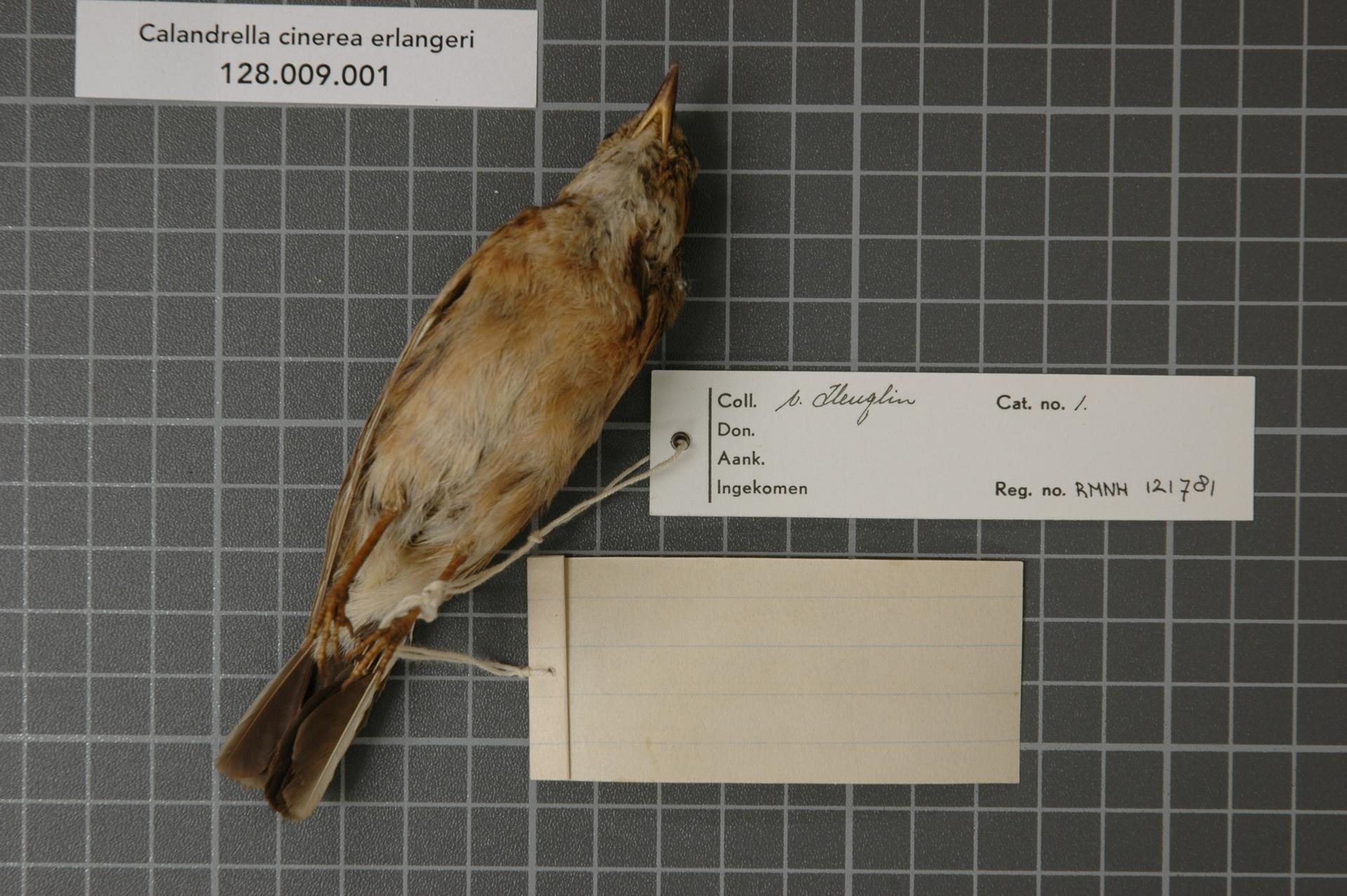

Scientific classification
- Kingdom: Animalia
- Phylum: Chordata
- Class: Aves
- Order: Passeriformes
- Family: Alaudidae
- Genus: Calandrella
- Species: C. blanfordi
- Subspecies: C. b. erlangeri

Trinomial name
- Calandrella blanfordi erlangeri (Neumann, 1906)

Synonyms
- Calandrella blanfordi erlangeri; Calandrella blanfordi fuertesi; Calandrella cinerea erlangeri; Calandrella cinerea ruficeps; Calandrella erlangeri; Tephrocorys cinerea erlangeri

= Erlanger's lark =

Species of bird

Erlanger's lark (Calandrella blanfordi erlangeri) is a small passerine bird of the lark family endemic to the highlands of Ethiopia. The name of this bird commemorates the German ornithologist Carlo von Erlanger.

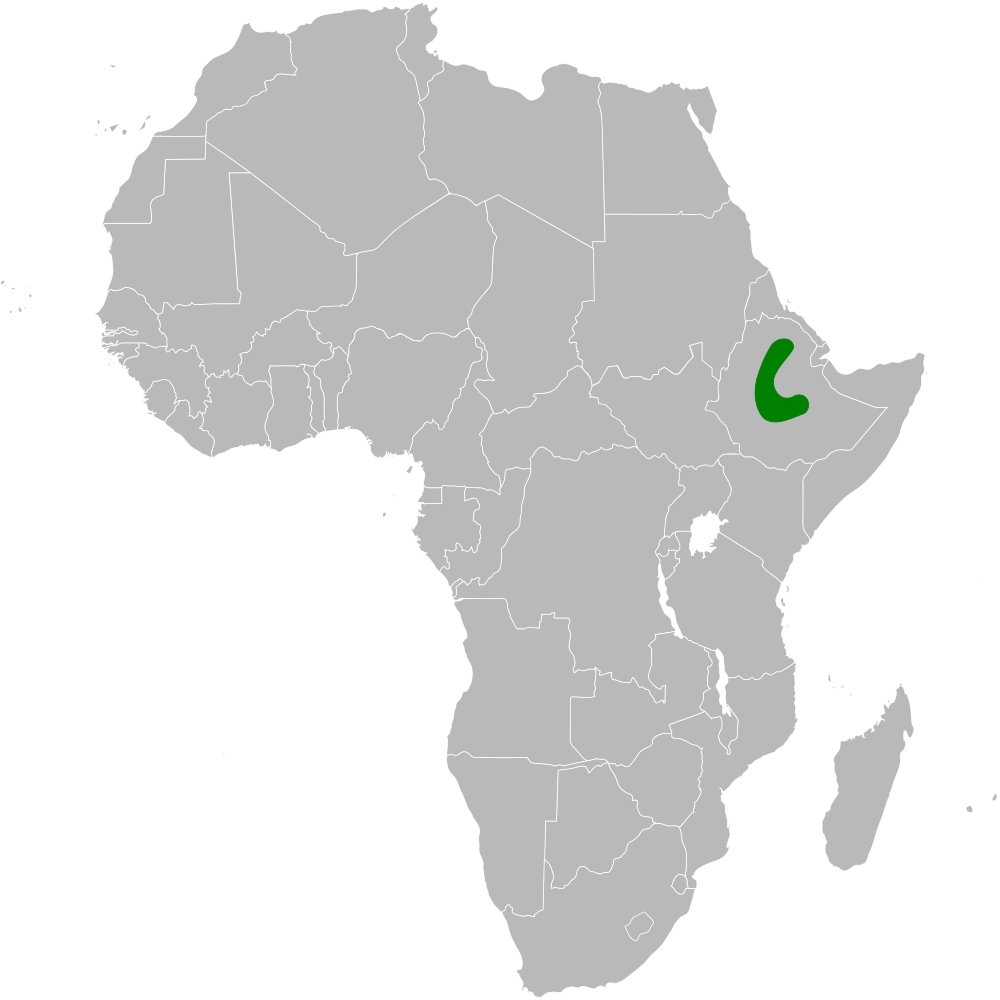
Calandrella erlangeri areal

It is considered to be a subspecies of Blanford's lark. Alternate names include Erlanger's red-capped lark, Erlanger's short-toed lark and Ethiopian short-toed lark.
