= Heliobolus nitidus =

Conservation status
- Least Concern (IUCN 3.1)

Scientific classification
- Kingdom: Animalia
- Phylum: Chordata
- Class: Reptilia
- Order: Squamata
- Suborder: Lacertoidea
- Family: Lacertidae
- Genus: Heliobolus
- Species: H. nitidus

Binomial name
- Heliobolus nitidus (Günther, 1872)

Species of lizard

Heliobolus nitidus, also known as the glittering sand lizard, is a species of lizard. It is found in Nigeria, Togo, Benin, Democratic Republic of the Congo, Central African Republic, Chad, Ivory Coast, Guinea, Cameroon, Burkina Faso, Niger, and Uganda. It is widespread but uncommon in the Sudanese–Guinean savanna belt.
