= Heliobolus bivari =

Scientific classification
- Kingdom: Animalia
- Phylum: Chordata
- Class: Reptilia
- Order: Squamata
- Family: Lacertidae
- Genus: Heliobolus
- Species: H. bivari

Binomial name
- Heliobolus bivari Marques, Ceríaco, Heinicke, Chehouri, Conradie, Tolley, & Bauer, 2022

Species of lizard

Heliobolus bivari, also known commonly as Bivar's bushveld lizard, is a species of lizard in the family Lacertidae. The species is endemic to southwestern Angola.

Heliobolus bivari measure on average 55 mm (2.2 in) in snout–vent length. The tail is long, averaging 124 mm (4.9 in).
