= Heliobolus spekii =

Conservation status
- Least Concern (IUCN 3.1)

Scientific classification
- Kingdom: Animalia
- Phylum: Chordata
- Class: Reptilia
- Order: Squamata
- Family: Lacertidae
- Genus: Heliobolus
- Species: H. spekii

Binomial name
- Heliobolus spekii (Günther, 1872)

Synonyms
- Eremias spekii Günther, 1872; Eremias rugiceps W. Peters, 1878; Lampreremias spekii — Szczerbak, 1989; Heliobolus spekii — Broadley & Howell, 1991

Species of lizard

Heliobolus spekii, also known commonly as Speke's sand lizard, is a species of lizard in the family Lacertidae. The species is native to East Africa and the Horn of Africa. There are three recognized subspecies.

== Etymology ==
The specific name, spekii, is in honor of British explorer John Hanning Speke.

== Geographic range ==
H. spekii is found in Somalia, Ethiopia, South Sudan, Kenya, Uganda, and Tanzania.

== Reproduction ==
H. spekii is oviparous.

== Subspecies ==
Three subspecies are recognized as being valid, including the nominotypical subspecies.

- Heliobolus spekii scorteccii (Arillo, Balletto & Spanò, 1965)
- Heliobolus spekii sextaeniata (Stejneger, 1893)
- Heliobolus spekii spekii (Günther, 1872)

Nota bene: A trinomial authority in parentheses indicates that the subspecies was originally described in a genus other than Heliobolus.
