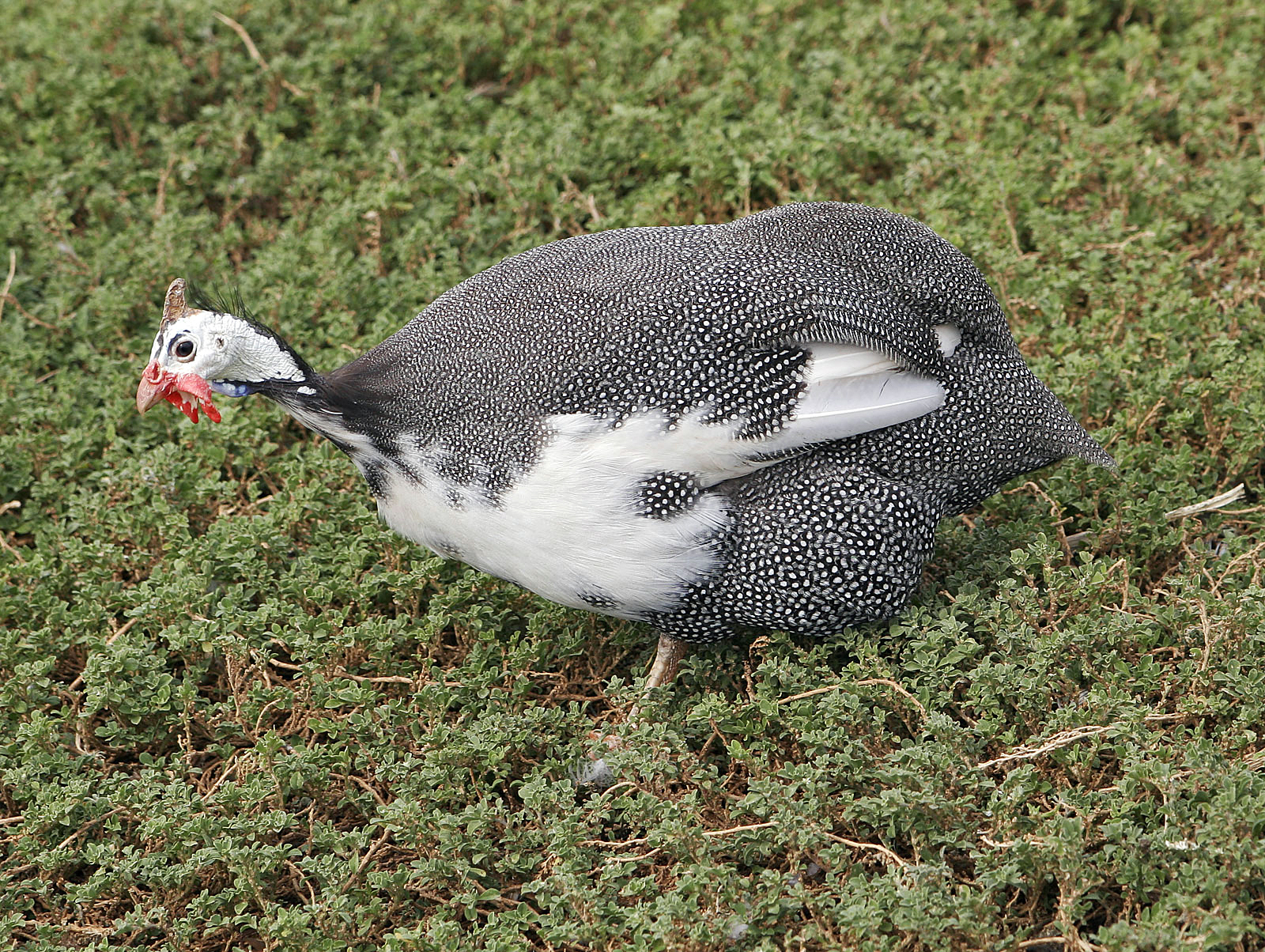
- Adult "pied" domestic guinea fowl

Conservation status
- Domesticated

Scientific classification
- Kingdom: Animalia
- Phylum: Chordata
- Class: Aves
- Order: Galliformes
- Family: Numididae
- Genus: Numida; Linnaeus, 1766
- Species: N. meleagris

Binomial name
- Numida meleagris Linnaeus, 1758

= Domestic guinea fowl =

Domesticated species of bird

Domestic guinea fowl, sometimes called pintade, pearl hen, or gleany, is poultry originating from Africa. They are the domesticated form of the helmeted guinea fowl (Numida meleagris) and are related to other game birds such as the pheasants, turkeys and partridges. Although the timing of their domestication is unknown, there is evidence that domestic guinea fowl were present in Greece by the 5th century BC.

== Appearance ==
Guinea fowl calls
Vocalizations of two female domestic guinea fowl

They lay 25–30 eggs in a deep, tapering nest. Their eggs are small, dark and extremely thick-shelled. The hens have a habit of hiding their nests, and sharing it with other hens until large numbers of eggs have accumulated. The incubation period is 26–28 days, and the chicks are called "keets". As keets, they are highly susceptible to dampness (they are indigenous to the more arid regions of Africa) and can die from following the mother through dewy grass. After their first two to six weeks of growth, though, they can be some of the hardiest domestic land fowl.

Sexing the birds is not as simple as telling a rooster from a hen chicken. When they are adults, the helmet and wattles of the male are larger than those of the female (Guinea-hen), and only the female makes the two-note cry imitated as "Buck-wheat!" or "Pot-rack!" while the male only has a one-note cry. Aside from that, though, the two sexes are mostly identical in appearance.

== Domesticated fowl ==
As domestics, guinea fowl are valuable pest controllers, eating many insects. They are especially beneficial in controlling the Lyme disease-carrying deer tick, as well as wasp nests. While they are rarely kept in large numbers, a few are sometimes kept with other fowl to be used as a security system against birds of prey. They will call with their loud, high shrieking voices if concerned about intruders. They are highly social birds and tend to languish when alone.

Within the domesticated species, many color variations have been bred forth aside from the "pearl" or natural color of the helmeted guinea. These include white, purple, slate, chocolate, lavender, coral blue, bronze, pewter, buff dundotte, blonde, and various pieds.

== Food usage ==
It can be cooked using any recipe that calls for chicken, but is considered to be more flavorful and, because of its higher cost, is generally served at special occasions. It is particularly common in French and Italian recipes.

== Gallery ==
A three-day-old keet

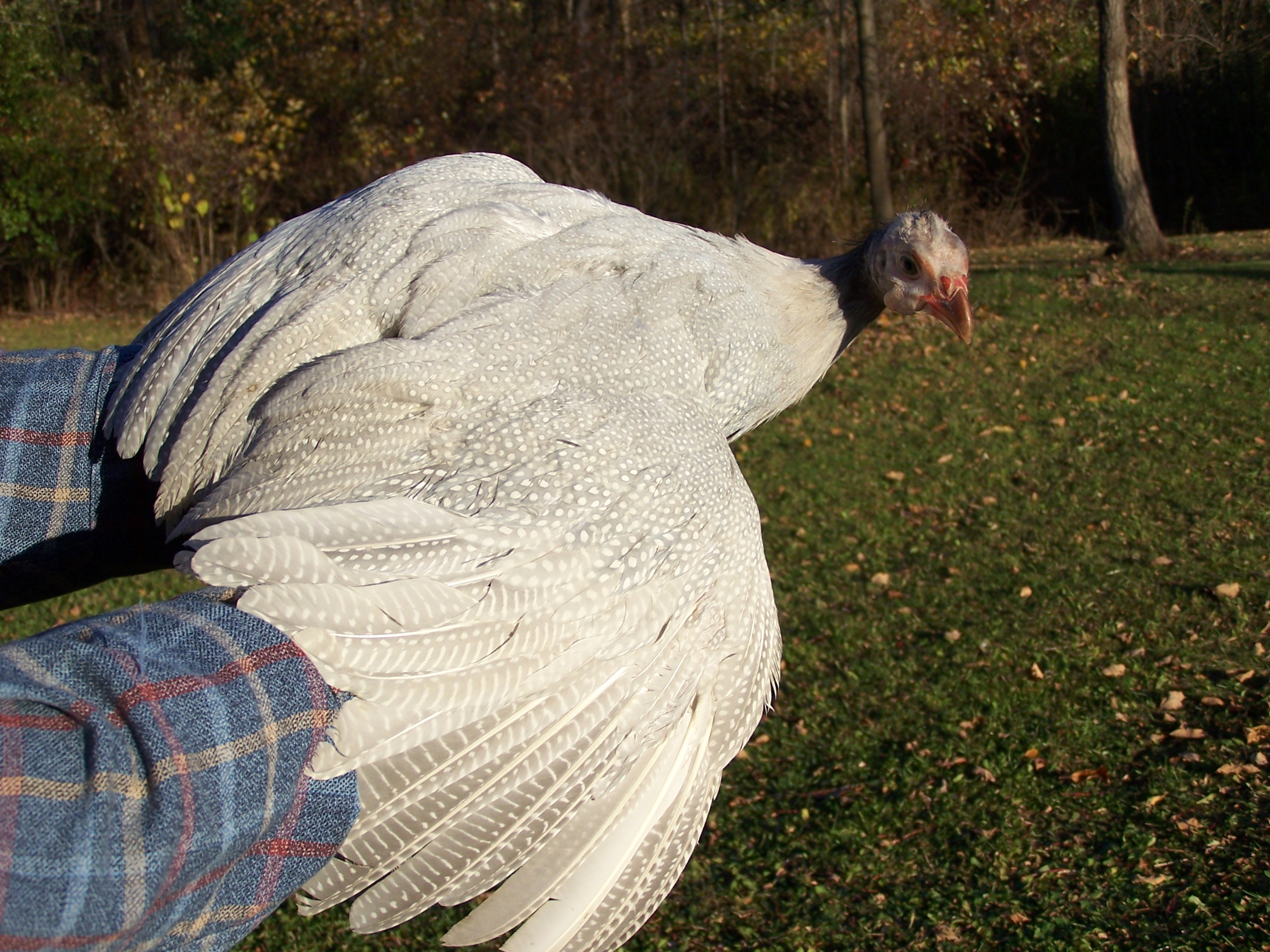
An adolescent lavender guinea fowl

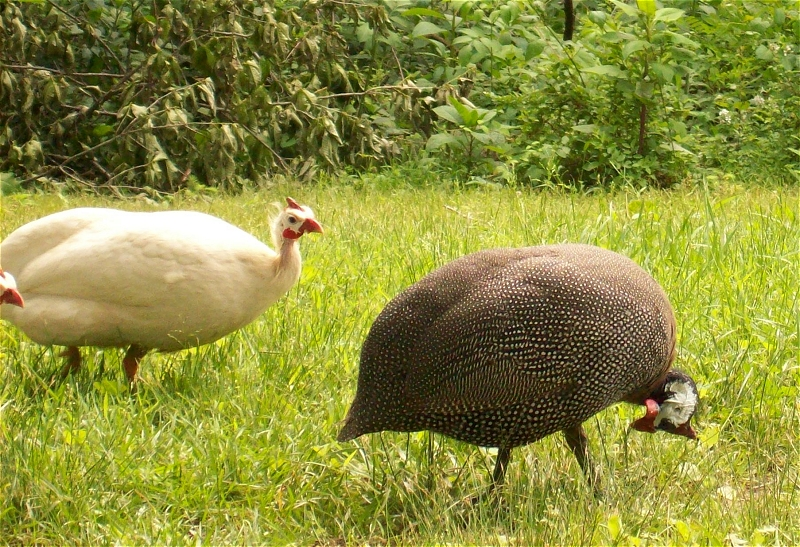
White and pearl guinea fowls

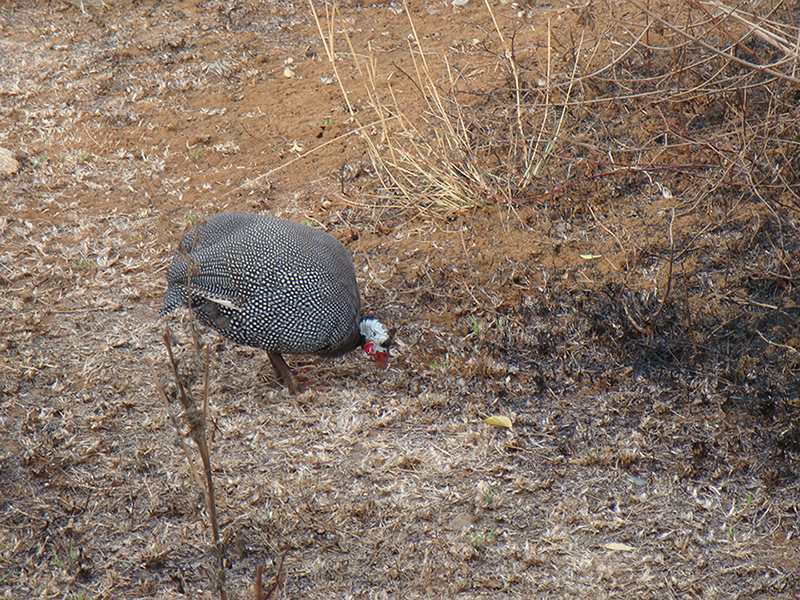
Domestic guinea fowl in India

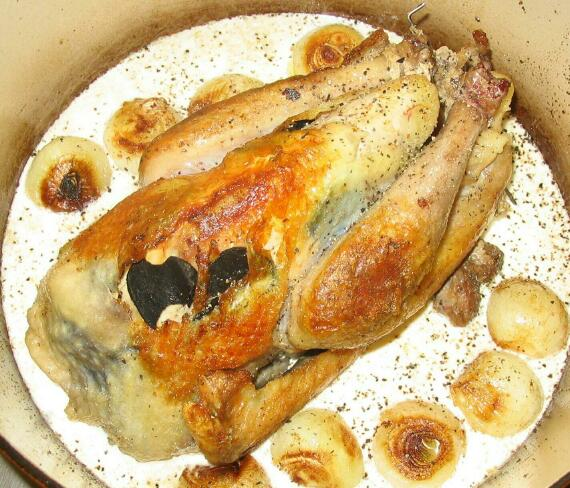
A cooked guinea hen
