= Arthur Rosenheim =

German chemist (1865–1942)

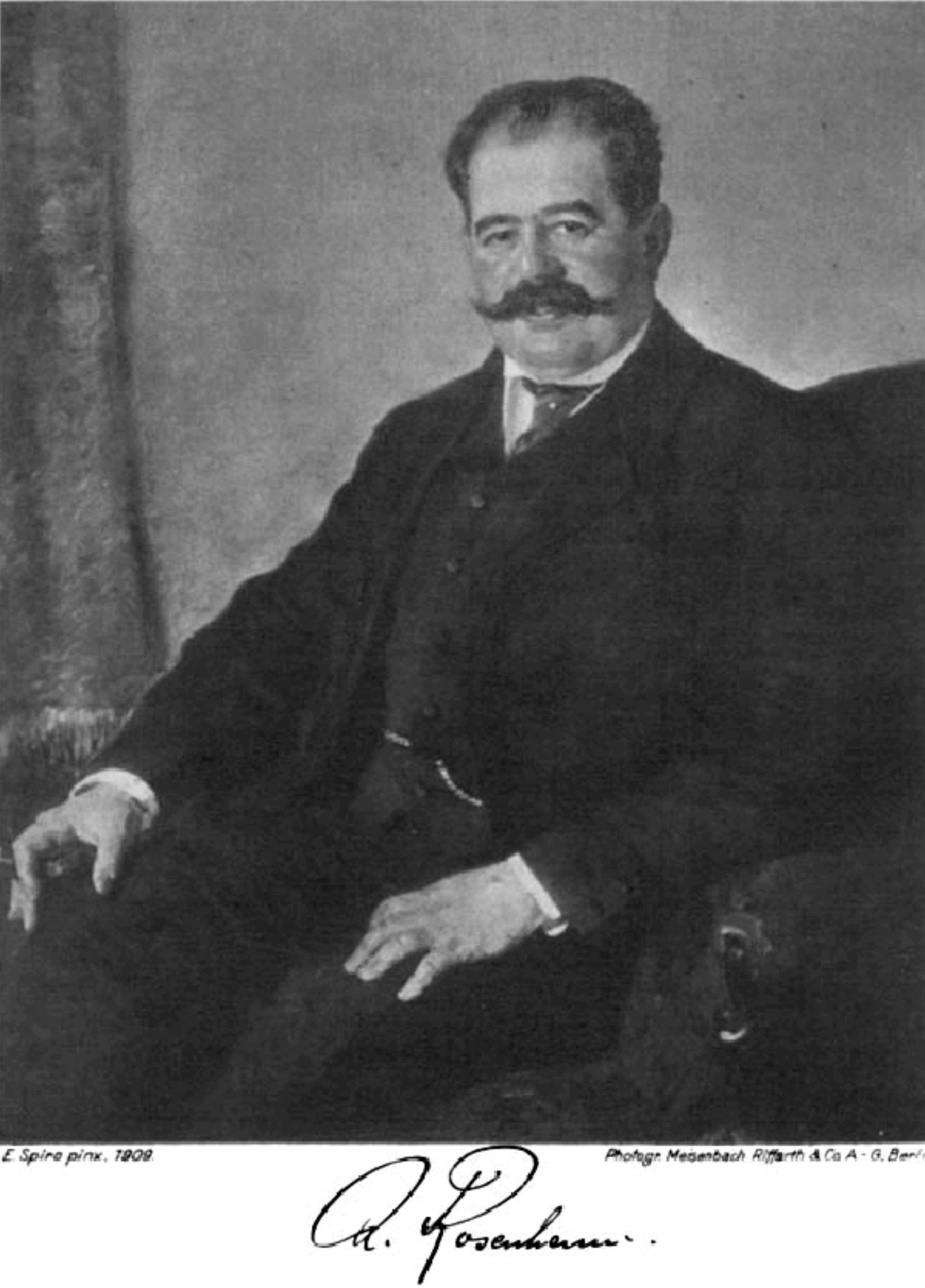
Rosenheim c. 1909

Arthur Rosenheim (17 August 1865 – 21 March 1942) was a German chemist. His main work was on heteropolymetalate, colloids and complex ion chemistry.

Rosenheim was born in New York to banker William and his wife Maria Hallgarten. He grew up in Berlin from 1873 and graduated from the Wilhelms-Gymnasium in 1884. He went to the University of Heidelberg and later the Universities at Munich and Berlin. He studied under Carl Rammelsberg, receiving a doctorate in 1888 with a dissertation on vanadium tungstic acid. After some studies on electrochemistry at Munich he became an assistant at the Chemical Institute in Berlin. He then founded a private laboratory with Carl Friedheim, and later worked with Richard Joseph Meyer. Other workers at the lab included the pioneering woman chemist Elsa Neumann. In 1906, he became an associate professor of physical chemistry at the University of Berlin. In 1912, he patented a process for the manufacture of hypophosphoric acid. In 1921 he became a full professor and also served as a vice president of the German Chemical Society. He was dismissed from the university and also on the urging of Heinrich Hörlein from the Chemical Society in 1933 due to his Jewish origin. A cousin, Friedrich Hallgarten, also became a chemist. His students included Otto Liebknecht, Gerhart Jander, and their main work was on heteropolymetalates.
