= Philochortus zolii =

Conservation status
- Endangered (IUCN 3.1)

Scientific classification
- Kingdom: Animalia
- Phylum: Chordata
- Class: Reptilia
- Order: Squamata
- Family: Lacertidae
- Genus: Philochortus
- Species: P. zolii

Binomial name
- Philochortus zolii Scortecci, 1934

Synonyms
- Philochortus lhotei Angel, 1936

Species of lizard

Philochortus zolii is a species of lizard in the family Lacertidae. The species is native to northern Africa.

== Taxonomy ==
Trape et al. (2012) considered West African P. lhotei a junior synonym of P. zolii as its morphological characters fall within the range of variability of Egyptian P. zolii reported by Baha El Din (2006).

=== Etymology ===
The specific name, zolii, is in honor of Italian diplomat Corrado Zoli, who was president of the Società geografica italiana.

The specific epithet, lhotei, is in honor of French ethnographer Henri Lhote.

== Description ==
For a general description see the diagnosis of the genus Philochortus. Philochortus zolii differs from other species of the genus by the following combination of characters (characters of P. lhotei [=Synonym] included):

Prefrontal scales often separated by a small subtriangular plate. Two parietals, interparietal in contact with the occipital scale. Temporal scales large, tympanum absent. 24–25 gular scales between collar and postmental shield. 4 supraoculars, often the first and fourth fragmented. Collar composed of 6 scales. 29–37 slightly keeled dorsal scales in a transversal row at midbody, those of the 4 median rows enlarged and stronger keeled. Ventrals in 6 longitudinal and 31 transversal rows. Dorsal side of the forelimbs covered by 2 or 3 large imbricate series of plates edged with black. 28–36 subdigital scales. 10–15 femoral pores are present.

Maximum snout-vent-length (SVL) 73 mm (2.9 in), average tail/SVL ratio = 2.8.

Upper head greenish grey or brownish, sides of head bluish white. Clearly striated in all ages. Back maroon with 6 sandy-white stripes. Lateral sides with streaks of large black blotches, which become more evident in adults. Limbs greenish yellow with dark marbling. Tail brilliant red in young, reddish or brownish red in adults.

== Distribution ==
P. zolii is known from five localities widely scattered across northern Africa. It is known in Libya from the Oasis of Elbarkat (Al Barkat) 8 km south of Ghat in Fezzan and from near Ajedabia in western Cyrenaica. In Egypt it is known from Wadi El Natrun; this subpopulation was previously misidentified as belonging to P. intermedius. This account follows Trape et al. (2012) in considering a specimen from Abezou in Niger and another from near Bourem in Mali (previously considered the only known representatives of P. lhotei) as also representing P. zolii.

== Habitat and ecology ==
The five widely scattered records of P. zolii which also occurred only in very small populations indicate that it is a very rare species. Individuals were found restricted to semi-desert areas with grassy vegetation on sandy soil or other steppe vegetation near oases. The best known subpopulation is located in Wadi El Natrun/Egypt at the margin of salt marshes. Here it can be found climbing in microhabitats created by the halfa grass Desmostachya bipinnata and also in stands of Alhagi graecorum.

Philochortus zolii digs burrows in the sandy soil below the clumps of grasses and uses its forelimbs to push sand out of its burrow.

=== Reproduction ===
P. zolii is oviparous.

== Conservation ==
P. zolii is threatened by habitat loss.
