= Philochortus hardeggeri =

Conservation status
- Least Concern (IUCN 3.1)

Scientific classification
- Kingdom: Animalia
- Phylum: Chordata
- Class: Reptilia
- Order: Squamata
- Family: Lacertidae
- Genus: Philochortus
- Species: P. hardeggeri

Binomial name
- Philochortus hardeggeri (Steindachner, 1891)

Synonyms
- Latastia hardeggeri Steindachner, 1891; Eremias heterolepis Boettger, 1893; Latastia heterolepis (Boettger, 1893); Latastia degeni Boulenger, 1903

Species of lizard

Philochortus hardeggeri, also known commonly as Hardegger's orangetail lizard and Hardegger's shield-backed lizard, is a species of lizard in the family Lacertidae. The species is native to the Horn of Africa.

== Etymology ==
The specific name, hardeggeri, is in honor of Austrian physician Dominik Kammel von Hardegger (1844–1915), who explored Ethiopia and Somalia.

== Geographic range ==
P. hardeggeri is found in Djibouti, Ethiopia, and Somalia.

== Habitat ==
The preferred natural habitats of P. hardeggeri are desert and savanna, at altitudes below 1,100 m (3,600 ft).

== Reproduction ==
P. hardeggeri is oviparous.

== Taxonomy ==
Philochortus hardeggeri was originally described as Latastia hardeggeri, a species new to science, by Austrian herpetologist Franz Steindachner in 1891. In 1917 the species was assigned to the genus Philochortus as Philocortus hardeggeri by Belgian-British herpetologist George Albert Boulenger. Boulenger also determined that two other species, Eremias heterolepis Boettger, 1893 and Latastia degeni Boulenger, 1903 are junior synonyms of Philocortus hardeggeri.
