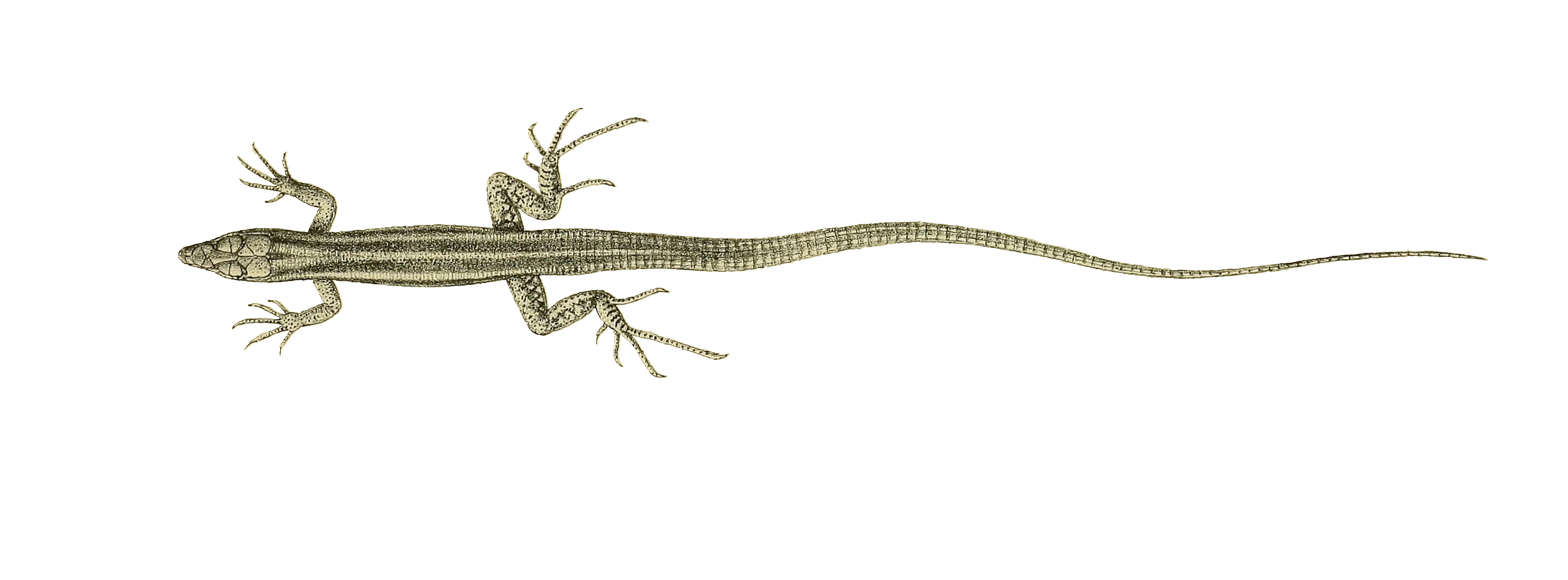
- Philochortus phillipsii

Conservation status
- Least Concern (IUCN 3.1)

Scientific classification
- Kingdom: Animalia
- Phylum: Chordata
- Class: Reptilia
- Order: Squamata
- Family: Lacertidae
- Genus: Philochortus
- Species: P. phillipsi

Binomial name
- Philochortus phillipsi (Boulenger, 1898)

Synonyms
- Latastia phillipsii Boulenger, 1898; Philochortus phillipsii — Boulenger, 1917; Philochortus phillipsi — Parker, 1942

= Philochortus phillipsi =

Species of lizard

Philochortus phillipsi, known commonly as Phillips' orangetail lizard or Phillips' shield-backed lizard, is a species of lizard in the family Lacertidae. The species is endemic to the Horn of Africa.

== Etymology ==
The specific name, phillipsi, is in honor of British naturalist Ethelbert Lort Phillips.

== Geographic range ==
P. phillipsi is found in Ethiopia and Somalia.

== Description ==
P. phillipsi is a small lizard with a very long tail. A male specimen with a total length of 156 mm (6.1 in) has a snout-to-vent length (SVL) of 42 mm (1.7 in) and a tail 114 mm (4.5 in) long.

== Reproduction ==
P. phillipsi is oviparous.
