= Philochortus =

Scientific classification
- Kingdom: Animalia
- Phylum: Chordata
- Class: Reptilia
- Order: Squamata
- Family: Lacertidae
- Subfamily: Lacertinae
- Genus: Philochortus; Matschie, 1893.

Species
- See text.

Genus of lizards

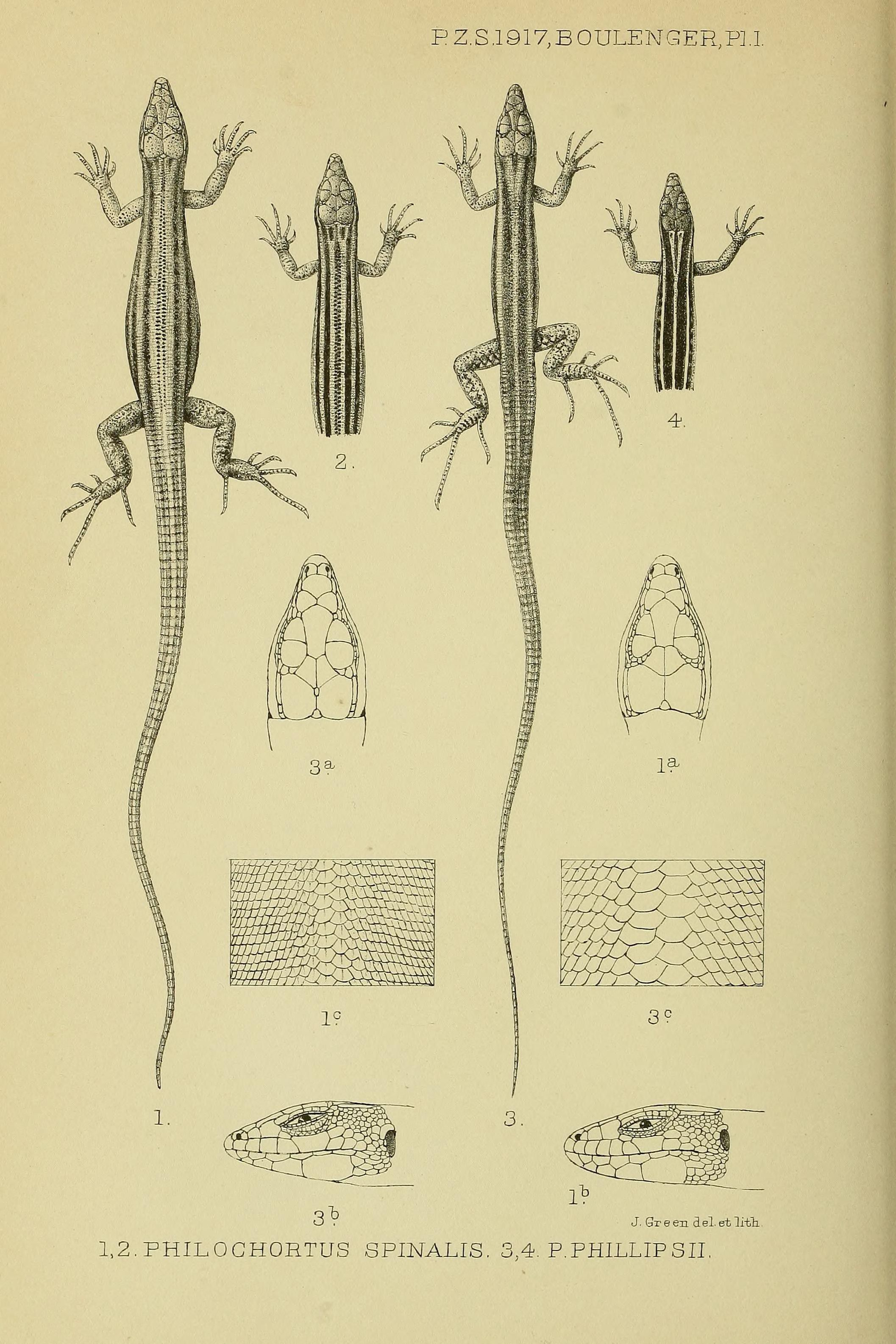
Philochortus spinalis and P. phillipsii

Philochortus is a genus of lizards of the family Lacertidae. Species of this genus are distributed in Egypt, Algeria, Libya, Mali, Niger, Ethiopia, Djibouti, Eritrea, Somalia, Kenya, Yemen, and Saudi Arabia.

== Etymology ==
Philochortus means grass-loving (Greek: philos = friend, chortos = grass). The common name of Philochortus species is therefore grass-loving lizards, or shield-backed ground lizards because of their typical back scalation and terrestrial habitat.

== Diagnosis ==
Species of Philochortus are medium to large-sized lacertids with long cylindrical tails. The unregenerated tail is up to 3.25 times longer than head and body. Eyes with movable lids. The nostril is pierced between two shields and usually bordered by the first supralabial or narrowly separated from it. The collar is well marked. The ventral plates are smooth, feebly imbricate and arranged in 6 longitudinal series. The dorsal scales are smooth or keeled. Back with 2 to 6 longitudinal series of enlarged plate-like scales along the dorsal mid-line. This is the main difference to Latastia. Femoral pores are present on the inside of the thighs, more prominent in males. Tail base in males much broader than in females.

== Habitat and natural history ==
The natural history of all species of Philochortus is only poorly known. Many of the species inhabit semiarid, arid or hyperarid regions, mountainous areas as well as plains from sea level up to 1,500 m (4,900 ft) altitude (P. neumanni). Most species prefer sparsely vegetated, open and sandy or fairly rocky localities (P. neumanni) and can be found in Acacia-Commiphora deciduous bushland and semidesert bushland vegetation types. But P. zolii and P. neumanni can be found also in marginal unattended cultivated areas with Desmostachya bipinnata grass and other scrub and well vegetated natural habitats.

The species of Philochortus are diurnal, sun-loving active predators on insects and other arthropods, egg-laying and terrestrial but P. zolii is an avid climber. The long stiff tail is aiding in balance on vegetation. They dig burrows in the soil below clumps of grasses or small bushes.

== Species ==
The following seven species are recognized as being valid.

- Philochortus hardeggeri (Steindachner, 1891) – Hardegger's orangetail lizard, Hardegger's shield-backed lizard
- Philochortus intermedius Boulenger, 1917 – southern orangetail lizard, Boulenger's shield-backed lizard
- Philochortus neumanni Matschie, 1893 – Neumann's orangetail lizard
- Philochortus phillipsi (Boulenger, 1898) – Phillips's shield-backed lizard
- Philochortus rudolfensis Parker, 1932 – southern shield-backed lizard
- Philochortus spinalis (W. Peters, 1874) – Peters's shield-backed lizard, Eritrea orangetail lizard
- Philochortus zolii Scortecci, 1934

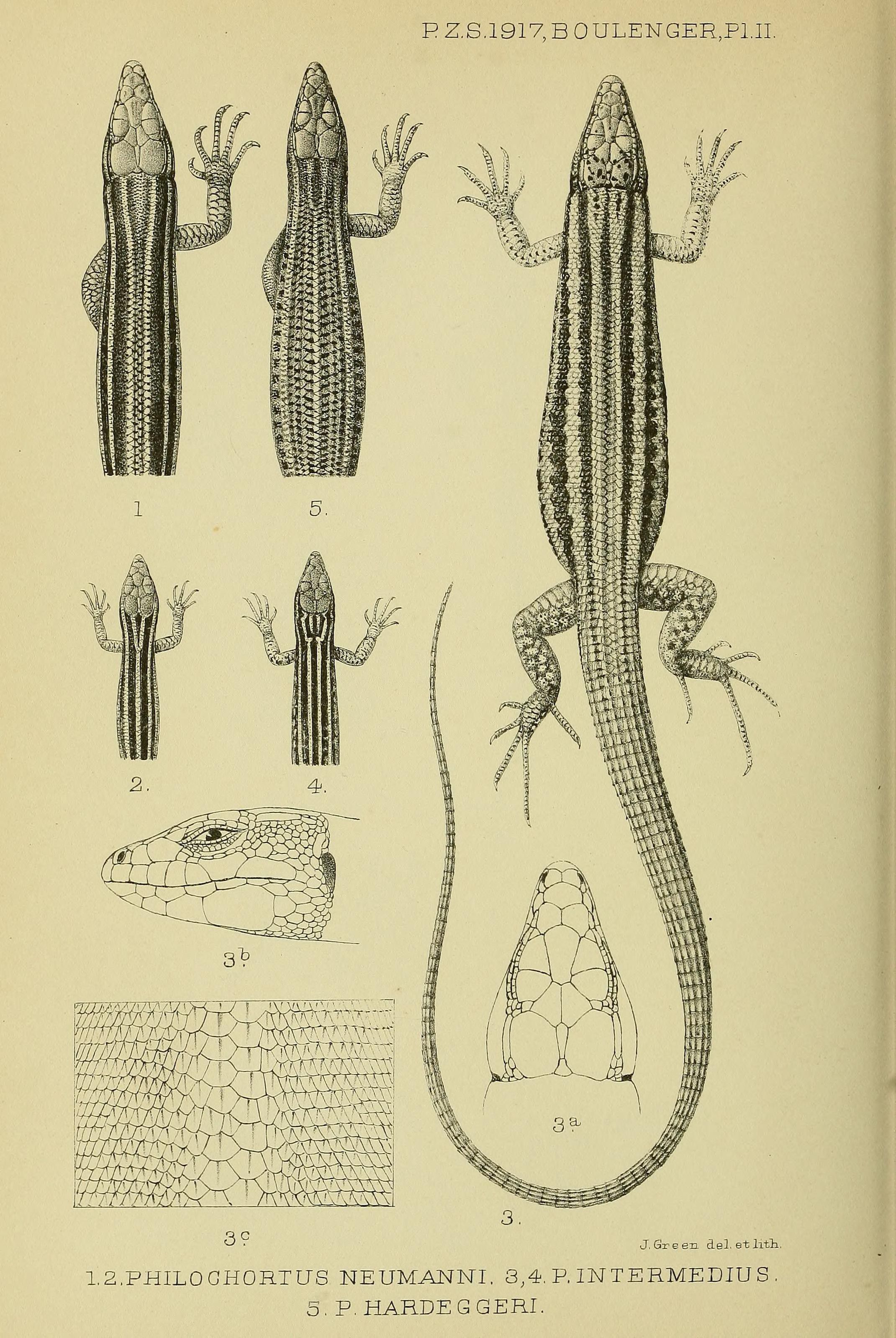
Philochortus neumanni, P. intermedius and P. hardeggeri

Nota bene: A binomial authority in parentheses indicates that the species was originally described in a genus other than Philochortus.
