= Heliobolus neumanni =

Conservation status
- Data Deficient (IUCN 3.1)

Scientific classification
- Kingdom: Animalia
- Phylum: Chordata
- Class: Reptilia
- Order: Squamata
- Family: Lacertidae
- Genus: Heliobolus
- Species: H. neumanni

Binomial name
- Heliobolus neumanni (Tornier, 1905)

Synonyms
- Eremias neumanni Tornier, 1905; Heliobolus neumanni — Broadley & Howell, 1991

Species of lizard

Heliobolus neumanni, also known commonly as Neumann's sand lizard, is a species of lizard in the family Lacertidae. The species is endemic to East Africa.

== Geographic distribution ==
Heliobolus neumanni is found in Ethiopia, Kenya, and Tanzania.

== Etymology ==
The specific name, neumanni, is in honor of German ornithologist Oscar Neumann.

== Habitat ==
The preferred natural habitat of Heliobolus neumanni is savanna, at altitudes from sea level to 1,500 m (4,900 ft).

== Reproduction ==
Heliobolus neumanni is oviparous.
