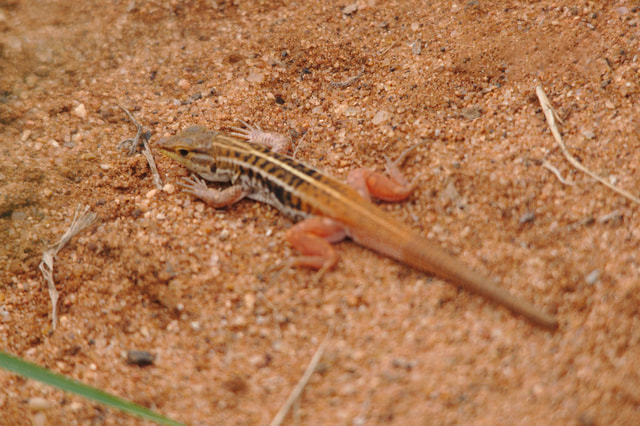

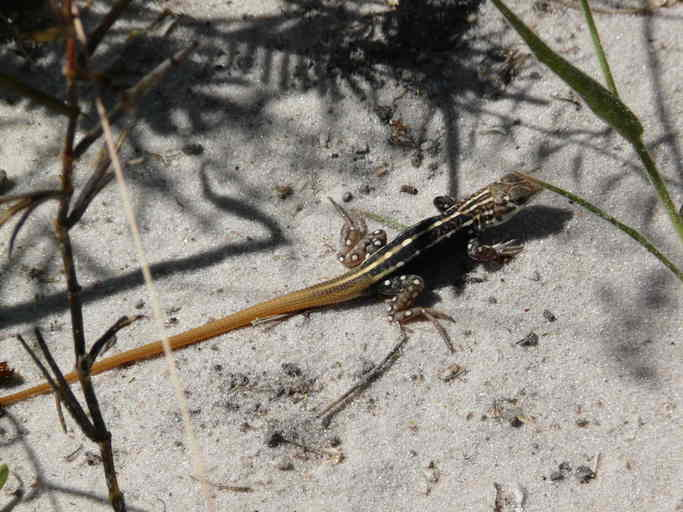
- adult and subadult

Conservation status
- Least Concern (IUCN 3.1)

Scientific classification
- Kingdom: Animalia
- Phylum: Chordata
- Class: Reptilia
- Order: Squamata
- Family: Lacertidae
- Genus: Heliobolus
- Species: H. lugubris

Binomial name
- Heliobolus lugubris (A. Smith, 1838)

Synonyms
- Lacerta lugubris Smith, 1838; Eremias lugubris – Duméril & Bibron, 1839

= Heliobolus lugubris =

Bushveld lizard

Species of lizard

Heliobolus lugubris, also known commonly as the bushveld lizard, mourning racerunner, or the black and yellow sand lizard, is a species of lizard in the family Lacertidae. The species is found in Southern Africa: southern Angola, Namibia, Botswana, southwestern Zimbabwe, southern Mozambique, and south-central to northern South Africa.

== Mimicry ==
Juveniles of H. lugubris are black with light spots and move with a hunched gait, mimicking the appearance of Anthia ground beetles. This mimicry is thought to discourage predation, as the beetles spray formic acid as a defense mechanism and are thus less appealing targets for predators. This is one of very few recorded examples of a vertebrate mimicking an invertebrate.
