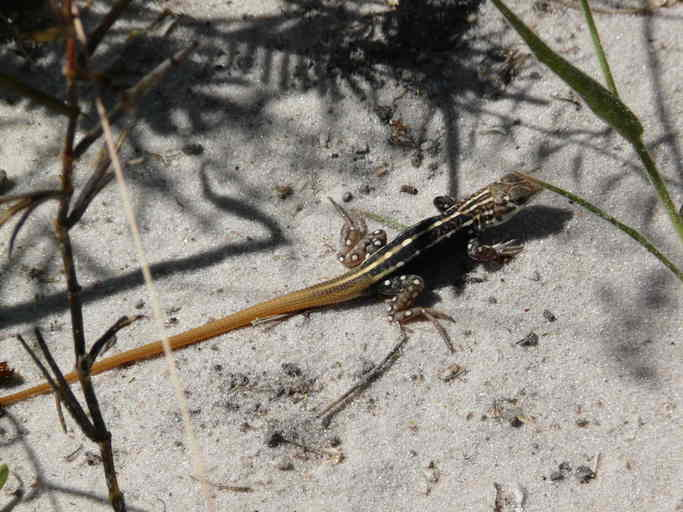
- Heliobolus lugubris

Scientific classification
- Kingdom: Animalia
- Phylum: Chordata
- Class: Reptilia
- Order: Squamata
- Family: Lacertidae
- Genus: Heliobolus; Fitzinger, 1843

Type species
- Lacerta lugubris A. Smith, 1838

= Heliobolus =

Genus of lizards

Heliobolus is a genus of lizards of the family Lacertidae. The genus is endemic to Africa.

== Species ==
There are six recognized species:

- Heliobolus bivari Marques, Ceríaco, Heinicke, Chehouri, Conradie, Tolley & Bauer, 2022 – Bivar’s bushveld lizard
- Heliobolus crawfordi Marques, Ceríaco, Heinicke, Chehouri, Conradie, Tolley & Bauer, 2022 – Crawford-Cabral’s bushveld lizard
- Heliobolus lugubris (A. Smith, 1838) – bushveld lizard, mourning racerunner, black and yellow sand lizard
- Heliobolus neumanni (Tornier, 1905) – Neumann's sand lizard
- Heliobolus nitidus (Günther, 1872) – glittering sand lizard
- Heliobolus spekii (Günther, 1872) – Speke's sand lizard

Nota bene: A binomial authority in parentheses indicates that the species was originally described in a genus other than Heliobolus.
