= Heliobolus crawfordi =

Scientific classification
- Kingdom: Animalia
- Phylum: Chordata
- Class: Reptilia
- Order: Squamata
- Family: Lacertidae
- Genus: Heliobolus
- Species: H. crawfordi

Binomial name
- Heliobolus crawfordi Marques, Ceríaco, Heinicke, Chehouri, Conradie, Tolley, & Bauer, 2022

Species of lizard

Heliobolus crawfordi, also known commonly as Crawford-Cabral's bushveld lizard, is a species of lizard in the family Lacertidae. The species is endemic to the central coastal regions of Angola.

Heliobolus crawfordi measure on average 52 mm (2.0 in) in snout–vent length. The tail is long, averaging 122 mm (4.8 in).
