= Philochortus rudolfensis =

Conservation status
- Data Deficient (IUCN 3.1)

Scientific classification
- Kingdom: Animalia
- Phylum: Chordata
- Class: Reptilia
- Order: Squamata
- Family: Lacertidae
- Genus: Philochortus
- Species: P. rudolfensis

Binomial name
- Philochortus rudolfensis Parker, 1932

Species of lizard

Philochortus rudolfensis, also known commonly as the southern shield-backed lizard and the Turkana shield-backed ground lizard, is a species of lizard in the family Lacertidae. The species is native to East Africa and the Horn of Africa.

== Geographic range ==
P. rudolfensis is found in Ethiopia and Kenya.
