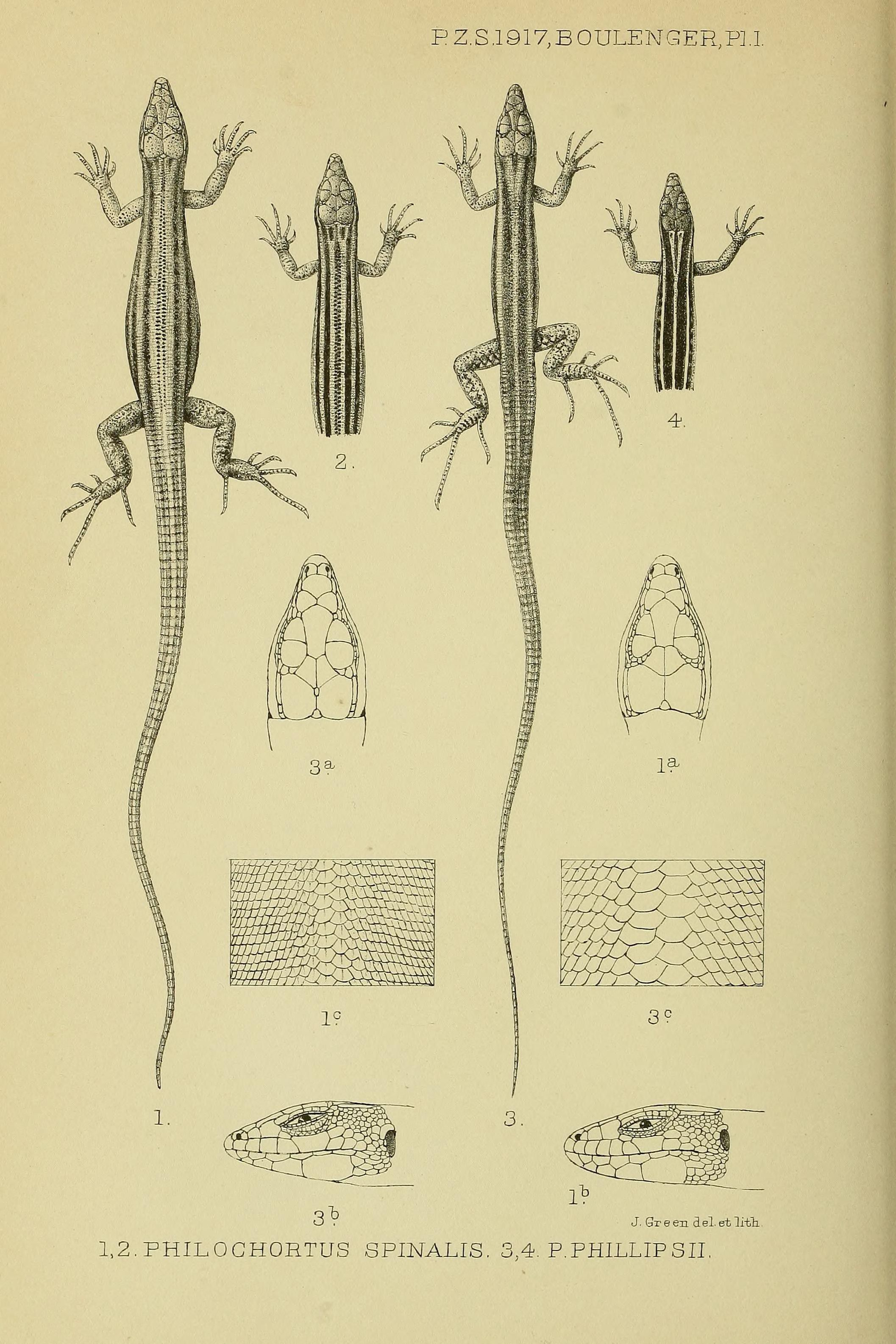
- PHILOCHORTUS

Conservation status
- Least Concern (IUCN 3.1)

Scientific classification
- Kingdom: Animalia
- Phylum: Chordata
- Class: Reptilia
- Order: Squamata
- Family: Lacertidae
- Genus: Philochortus
- Species: P. spinalis

Binomial name
- Philochortus spinalis (W. Peters, 1874)

= Philochortus spinalis =

Species of lizard

Philochortus spinalis, also known commonly as Peters's shield-backed lizard and the Eritrea orangetail lizard, is a species of lizard in the family Lacertidae. The species is native to the Horn of Africa.

== Geographic range ==
P. spinalis is found in Eritrea, Ethiopia, and Somalia.
