= Philochortus neumanni =

Conservation status
- Least Concern (IUCN 3.1)

Scientific classification
- Kingdom: Animalia
- Phylum: Chordata
- Class: Reptilia
- Order: Squamata
- Family: Lacertidae
- Genus: Philochortus
- Species: P. neumanni

Binomial name
- Philochortus neumanni Matschie, 1893

Synonyms
- Philochortus neumanni Matschie, 1893; Latastia neumanni — Anderson, 1895; Philocortus neumanni — Boulenger, 1917

Species of lizard

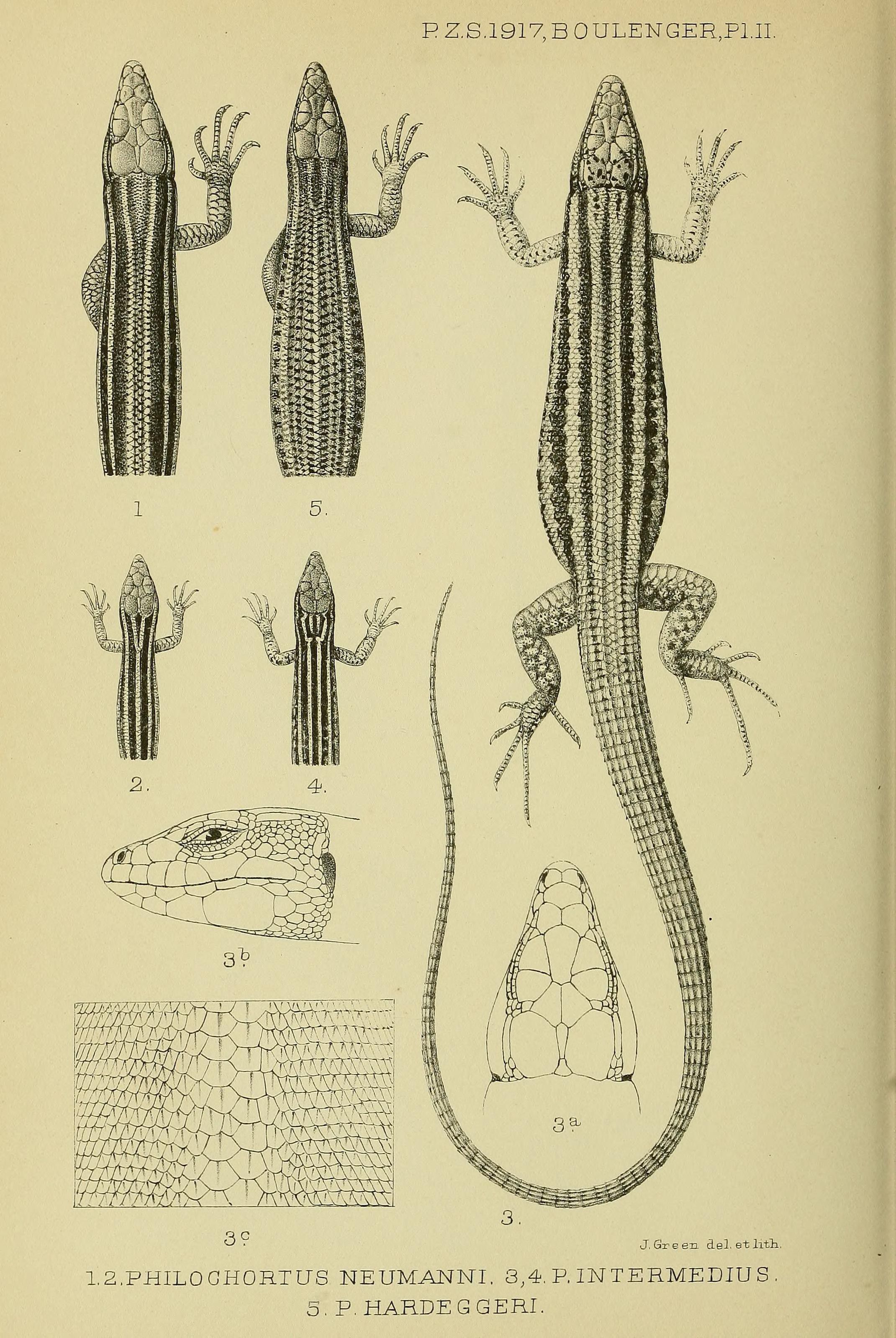

Philochortus neumanni, known commonly as Neumann's orangetail lizard, is a species of lizard in the family Lacertidae. The species is endemic to the Arabian Peninsula in Western Asia.

== Etymology ==
The specific name, neumanni, is in honor of German ornithologist Oscar Neumann.

== Geographic distribution ==
Philochortus neumanni is found in Saudi Arabia and Yemen.

== Habitat ==
The preferred natural habitats of Philochortus neumanni are forest and shrubland, at elevations of 80–1,500 m (260–4,920 ft), but it may also be found in agricultural areas.

== Description ==
Dorsally, Philochortus neumanni is brown or blackish with six narrow yellow stripes. Ventrally, it is white. Adults have a snout-to-vent length (SVL) of about 8 cm (3.1 in). The tail is very long, about 20 cm (7.9 in).

== Reproduction ==
Philochortus neumanni is oviparous.
