= Gerhart Jander =

Chemist and early Nazi Party member (1892–1961)

- Born: 26 October 1892; Altdöbern, Germany
- Died: 8 December 1961 (aged 69); Berlin, Germany
- Education: University of Berlin
- Scientific career
- Workplaces: University of Göttingen, KWI for Physical Chemistry and Elektrochemistry, University of Greifswald
- Doctoral advisor: Arthur Rosenheim
- Other academic advisors: Richard Zsigmondy; Adolf Windaus

Gerhart Jander (26 October 1892 – 8 December 1961) was a German inorganic chemist. His book, now normally only called "Jander-Blasius", on analytical chemistry is still used in German universities. His involvement in the chemical weapon research and close relation to the NSDAP have been uncovered by recent research.

== Life and work ==
Jander was born in Altdöbern, Oberspreewald-Lausitz. Jander studied in Technical University of Munich, and at University of Berlin where he received his Ph.D for work with Arthur Rosenheim in 1917. He joined Richard Zsigmondy at the University of Göttingen. He became professor in 1925 and after a two-year period being a temporary director of the Kaiser Wilhelm Institute for Physical Chemistry and Elektrochemistry from 1933 till 1935 he became professor for inorganic chemistry at the University of Greifswald. In 1951 he changed to Technische Universität Berlin. Jander died in Berlin in 1961.

== Critical reviews ==
The involvement of Jander in the research on chemical warfare and his influence on the Kaiser Wilhelm Institute for Physical Chemistry and Elektrochemistry after he followed Fritz Haber as director, who was forced to resign due to the Law for the Restoration of the Professional Civil Service, have been a point of research of the Max Planck Society (The Max Planck Society is the successor organisation of the Kaiser Wilhelm Society).
