= Elsa Neumann =

German physicist

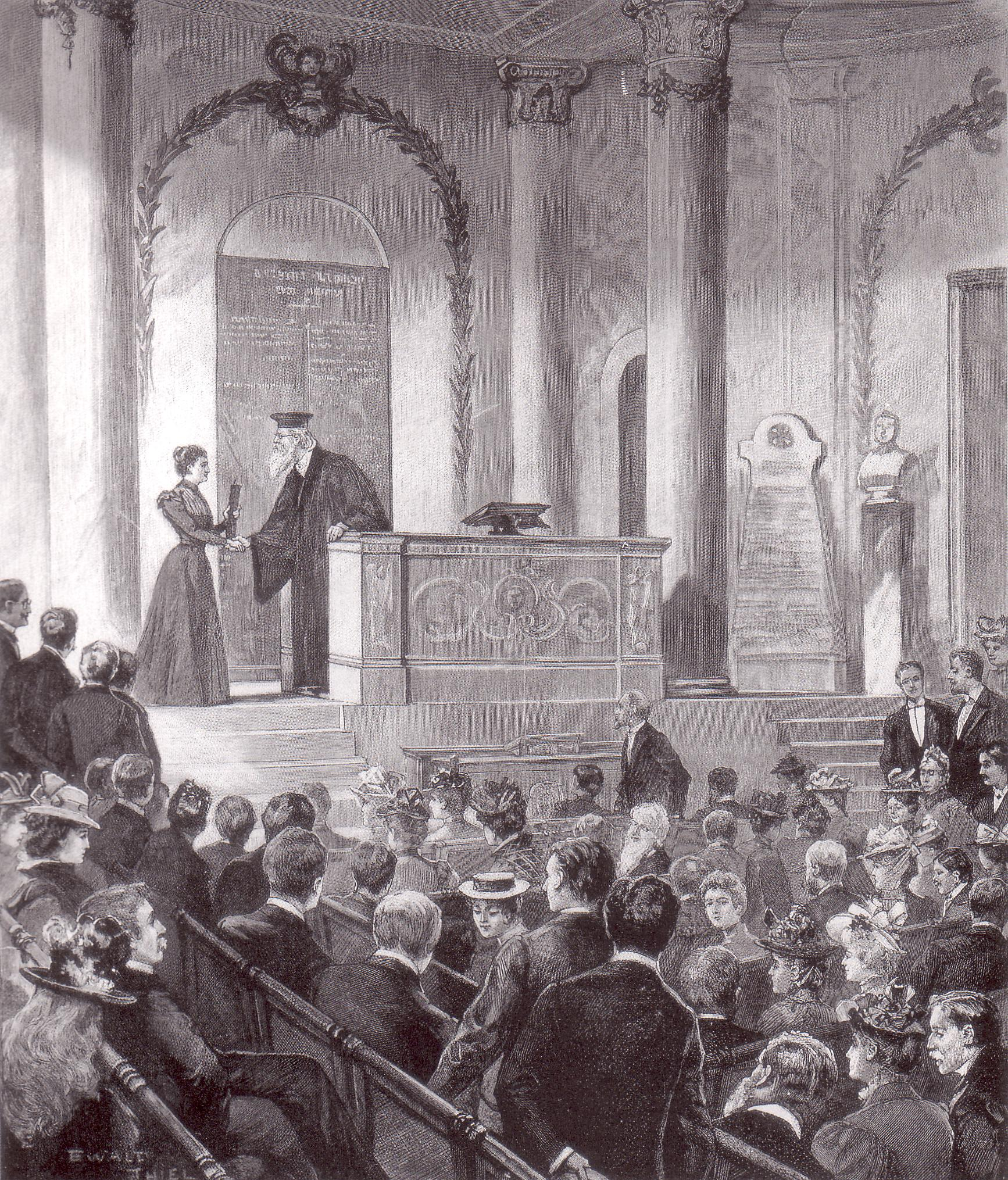
- Graduation from the University of Berlin, 1899
- Born: 23 August 1872; Berlin, German Empire
- Died: 23 July 1902 (aged 29); Berlin, German Empire
- Citizenship: German
- Education: University of Berlin
- Known for: Being the first woman to receive a doctorate in physics from the University of Berlin (in 1899)
- Relatives: Oscar Neumann (brother)
- Scientific career
- Fields: Physics, chemistry

Elsa Neumann (23 August 1872 – 23 July 1902) was a German physicist. She was the first woman to receive a PhD in physics from the University of Berlin, in 1899.

== Biography ==
=== Early life and education ===
Elsa was the daughter of Maximilian and Anna née Meyer, an older brother was the ornithologist Oscar Neumann while a sister Alice was a sculptor. As a woman, Elsa Neumann was generally denied access to higher education. In 1890 she graduated with a Lehrerinnenprüfung (teachers' diploma), a degree that did not require higher education at that time and was considered less than a Realgymnasium education. Thus she took private lessons with various professors in order to acquire the advanced knowledge and skills necessary for university-level studies. From 1894 she studied physics, mathematics, chemistry, and philosophy for nine semesters at the Universities of Berlin and Göttingen. Since women in Prussia were prohibited from pursuing regular university studies at that time, Neumann had to obtain permission from each professor to attend their lectures. The physics professors Emil Warburg and Max Planck were among her most influential supporters. In 1898 she received special approval from the Ministry of Education to obtain a doctorate degree. She graduated that the same year cum laude; the graduation ceremony was held on 18 February 1899. Her work Über die Polarisationskapazität umkehrbarer Elektroden ("On the polarization capacity of reversible electrodes") was published in the prestigious journal Annalen der Physik in 1899.

=== Later work and death ===
Elsa Neumann was aware of her unique and privileged position and advocated for women's right to higher education in Prussia. Although (or maybe because) she came from a wealthy family, she recognized that women needed financial support for their education. She was the founder, the first chairwoman, and later an honorary member of the Verein zur Gewährung zinsfreier Darlehen an studierende Frauen ("Association for granting interest-free loans to women students"), which was founded on 26 April 1900.

Due to poor job prospects in academic institutions for women with PhD degrees, Neumann became a private scholar and conducted her research at the chemical laboratory of Arthur Rosenheim (1865-1942) and Richard Joseph Meyer (1865-1939) in Berlin.

She died on 23 July 1902 from an accident while conducting experiments in the laboratory.

== Legacy ==
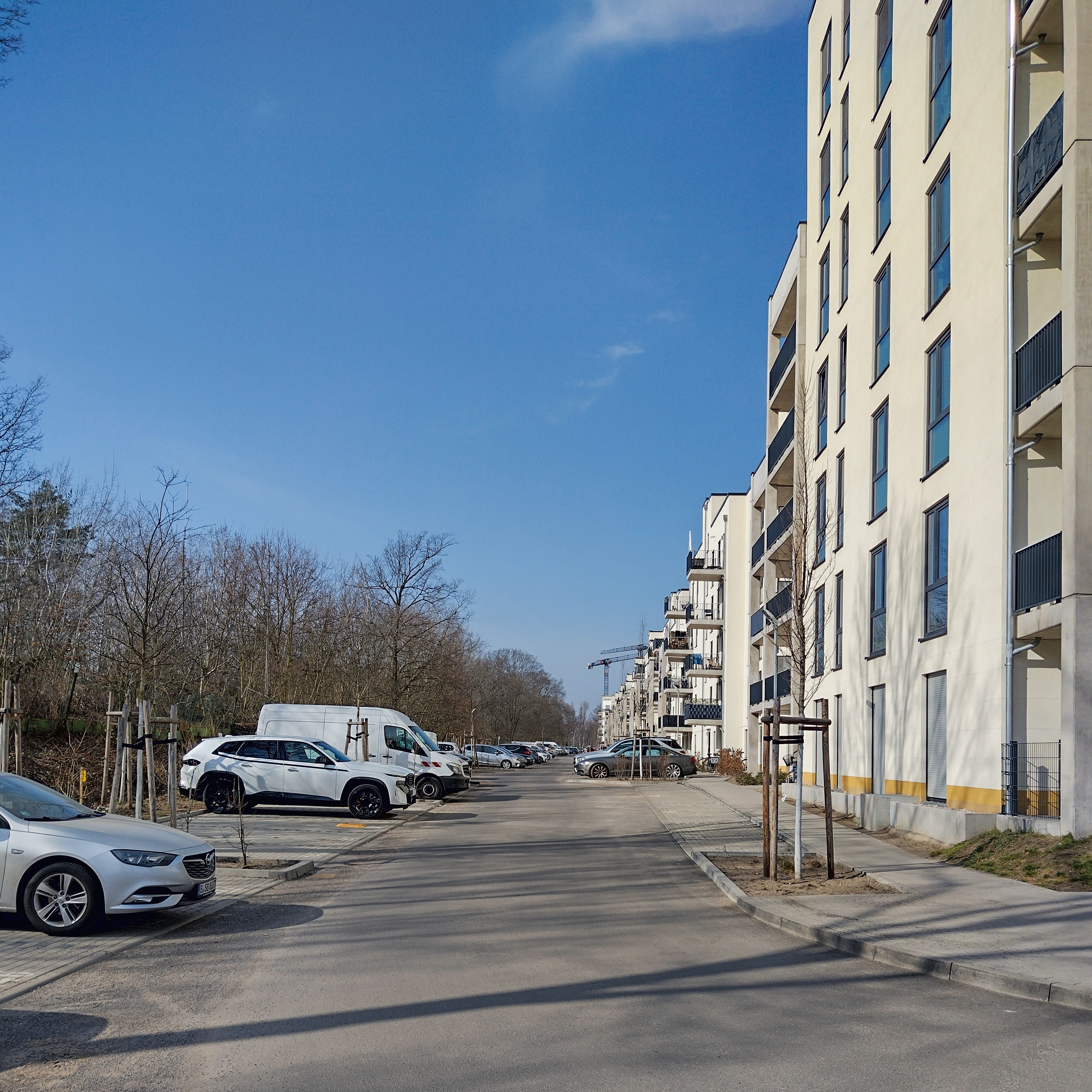
Elsa-Neumann-Straße in Berlin-Siemensstadt

After Neumann's death, her mother established the Elsa-Neumann-Preis ("Elsa Neumann Prize"), which was awarded on 18 February every year for the best dissertation in mathematics or physics at the University of Berlin, regardless of the gender or religion of the author. The twelve winners of the award from 1906 to 1918, however, were all male. The nuclear physicist Walther Bothe was a well-known winner of the Neumann Prize. After 1918, the prize was no longer awarded because of the inflation following World War I.

In 2010 the State of Berlin established the Elsa-Neumann-Stipendium ("Elsa Neumann scholarship") in her name to support young researchers.
