= Philochortus intermedius =

Scientific classification
- Kingdom: Animalia
- Phylum: Chordata
- Class: Reptilia
- Order: Squamata
- Family: Lacertidae
- Genus: Philochortus
- Species: P. intermedius

Binomial name
- Philochortus intermedius Boulenger, 1917

Species of lizard

Philochortus intermedius, also known commonly as the southern orangetail lizard and Boulenger's shield-backed lizard, is a species of lizard in the family Lacertidae. The species is native to the Horn of Africa.

== Geographic range ==
P. intermedius is found in Ethiopia and Somalia.
