= Oscar Neumann =

German ornithologist and naturalist

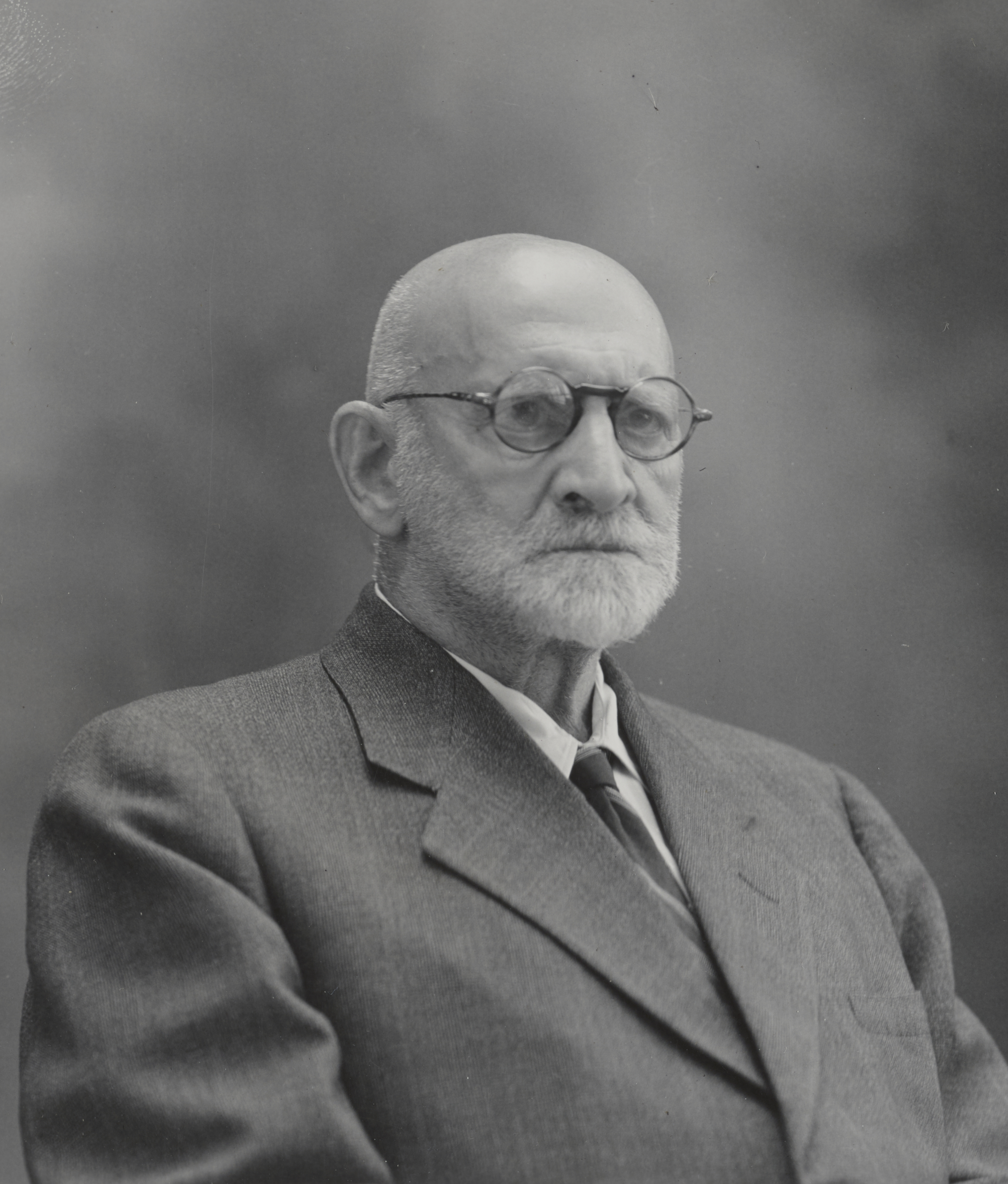
Portrait c. 1940

Oscar Rudolph Neumann (3 September 1867 – 17 May 1946) was a German ornithologist and naturalist who explored and collected specimens in Africa. He fled via Cuba and settled in the United States to escape Nazi persecution of Jews. Neumann's starling (Onychognathus neumanni) and several other species are named after him.

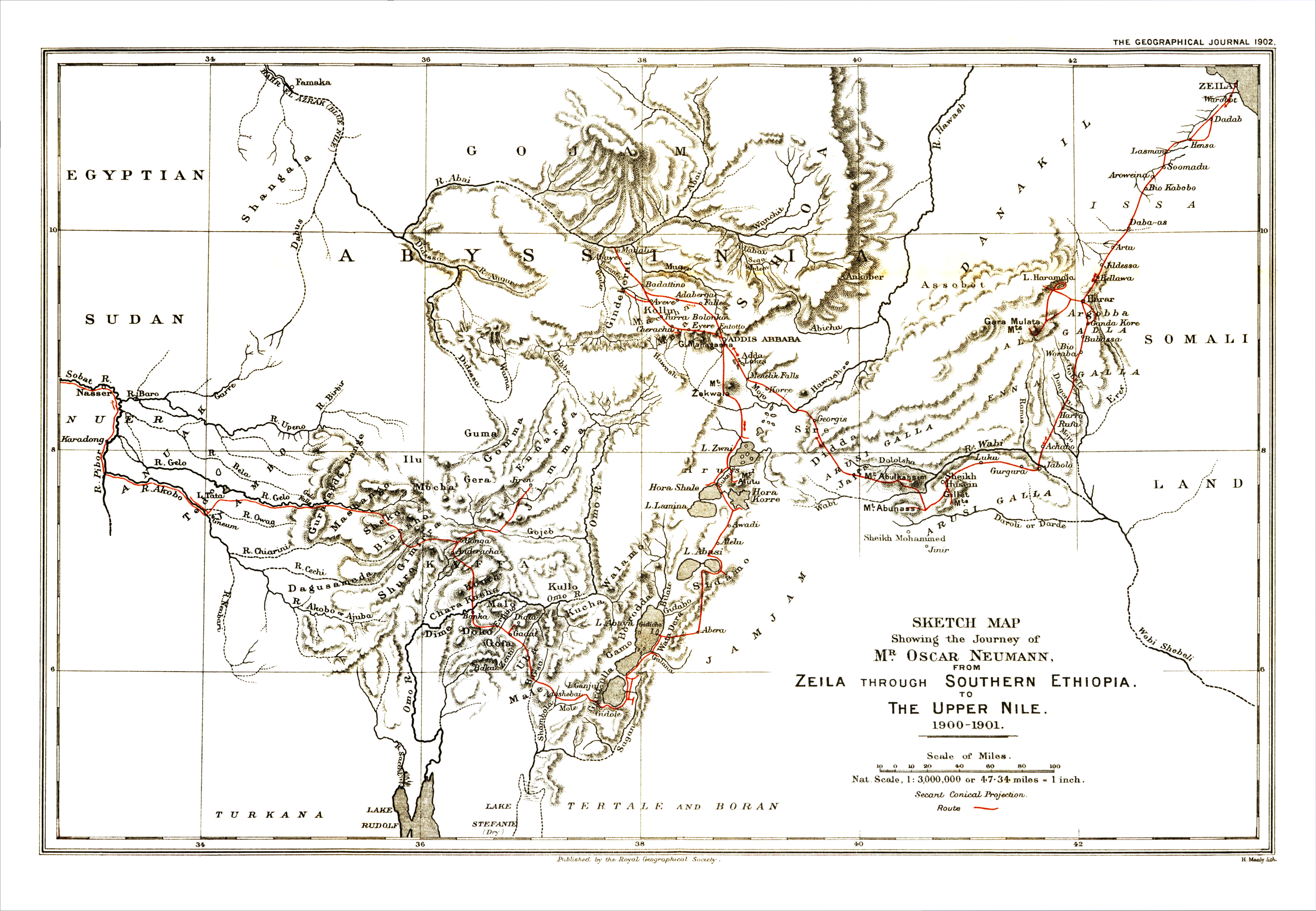
Neumann's travels in Ethiopia and Sudan

Neumann was born in wealthy Jewish family, the son of Maximilian and Anna née Meyer. A younger sister of his was Elsa Neumann (1872-1902) who became one of the first physics doctorates from Berlin University. Another sister Alice was a sculptor. He travelled to German East Africa across Tanganyika, Uganda and Kenya in 1892 and collected for the Berlin Museum publishing descriptions. In 1899 he accompanied Baron Carlo von Erlanger through Somaliland and southern Ethiopia, collecting birds that went to Lord Walter Rothschild's bird collection in Tring. In 1915 he went to New Guinea and also made an expedition to Sulawesi in 1938 sponsored by the specimen collector and dealer J. J. Menden. In 1908 he lost much of his money and was hoping to work for Rothschild in Tring but this did not materialize as Rothschild himself ran into financial problems. Neumann then took to stock-broking in Berlin. In 1941, with the help of his friend Julius Riemer he fled Nazi Germany, traveling from Berlin to Cuba, then to Chicago, where he worked the final years of his life as a curator in the Field Museum of Natural History. He was elected to the British Ornithologists' Union in 1897 but resigned in 1910 due to financial reasons. He never married. Parts of his collections are now in the Julius Riemer Museum in Wittenberg.

== Eponyms ==
Numerous zoological species bear his name, a few being:

- Neumann's red-winged starling (Onychognathus neumanni )
- Neumann's warbler (Hemitesia neumanni )
- Neumann's orangetail lizard (Philochortus neumanni Matschie, 1893)
- Neumann's sand lizard (Heliobolus neumanni Tornier, 1905)

== Publications associated with Neumann ==
- Die Oligochäten Nordost-Afrikas, nach den Ausbeuten der Herren Oscar Neumann und Carlo Freiherr von Erlanger, W Michaelsen (1903) Zoologische Jahrbuecher (Systematik) 18: 435-556 - Earthworms from Northeast Africa, according to the collections of Neumann and Erlanger.
- Scorpione und Solifugen Nordost-Afrikas, gesammelt 1900 und 1901 von Carlo Freiherrn von Erlanger und Oscar Neumann, Zoologische Jahrbuecher (Systematik) 18: 557-578 (1903) - Scorpions and Solifugae collected in 1900/01 by Neumann and Erlanger.
- Ueber die von Herrn Dr Neumann in Abessinien gesammelten aulacopoden Nacktschnecken, (1904) Zoologische Jahrbuecher (Systematik) 19: 673-726 - On data by Dr. Neumann in regards to Abyssinian aulacopod slugs.
- Homopteren aus Nordost-Afrika, gesammelt von Oscar Neumann, A Jacobi (1904) Zoologische Jahrbuecher 19: 761-782 - Hemiptera from Northeast Africa collected by Neumann.
- Schildkröten und Eidechsen aus Nord-Ost Afrika und Arabien. Aus Carlo v. Erlanger's und Oscar Neumann's Forschungsreise, G Tornier (1905) Zool. Jahrb Syst 22: 365-388 - Turtles and lizards from Northeast Africa and Arabia, in regards to Erlanger and Neumann's expedition.
- Über nordost-afrikanische und arabische Kriechtiere, by Oscar Rudolph Neumann (1905) - On Northeast African and Arabian reptiles.
