= Conspectus of the Ornithological Fauna of the USSR =

1991 publication by L. S. Stepanyan

Conspectus of the Ornithological Fauna of the USSR (ISBN 5-02-005300-7) is a 1991 Russian language publication by ornithologist L. S. Stepanyan.

It contains a list of bird species recorded from the former Soviet Union, together with details of their distribution, taxonomic relationships and subspecies.

== Taxonomic changes ==
The following is a list of the species splits & lumps proposed by Stepanyan:

- Siberian herring gull (Larus heuglini), together with the race vegae to be regarded as a separate species from herring and lesser black-backed gulls.
- Asian and lesser short-toed larks to be regarded as separate species
- Yellow-headed (Motacilla lutea), green-headed (M. taivana) and black-headed (M. feldegg) wagtails split from yellow wagtail (M. flava)
- Masked (Motacilla personata) and black-backed (M. lugens) wagtails split from white wagtail (M. alba)
- Eastern great (Parus minor), Turkestan (P. bokharensis), and Grey (P. cinereus) tits split from great tit (P. major)
- Ussuri (oriental, grey-bellied) (Pyrrhula griseiventris) and grey (P. cineracea) bullfinches split from common bullfinch (P. pyrrhula)

== Bibliography ==
- Madge, Steve (1991) Splitting and lumping in the Soviet Union Birding World 4(11):401-4
- Voous, K. H. (1977) List of recent Holarctic bird species
