= Short-toed lark =

Short-toed lark refers to a number of species of lark:

- Asian short-toed lark (Alaudala cheleensis), found from south-central to eastern Asia
- Greater short-toed lark (Calandrella brachydactyla), found in Europe, northern Africa and Asia
- Hume's short-toed lark (Calandrella acutirostris), found in south-central Asia
- Mediterranean short-toed lark (Alaudala rufescens), found in Europe, northern Africa and Asia
- Turkestan short-toed lark (Alaudala heinei), found in Europe, northern Africa and Asia
- Mongolian short-toed lark (or, Syke's short-toed lark; Calandrella dukhunensis), found in India and western China
- Rufous short-toed lark, alternate name for Red-capped lark (Calandrella cinerea), found in eastern and southern Africa
