= Rufous short-toed lark =

Rufous short-toed lark may refer to:

- Lesser short-toed lark, a species of lark found in Europe, northern Africa and Asia
- Red-capped lark, a species of lark found in eastern and southern Africa
- Somali short-toed lark, a species of lark found in eastern and north-eastern Africa
