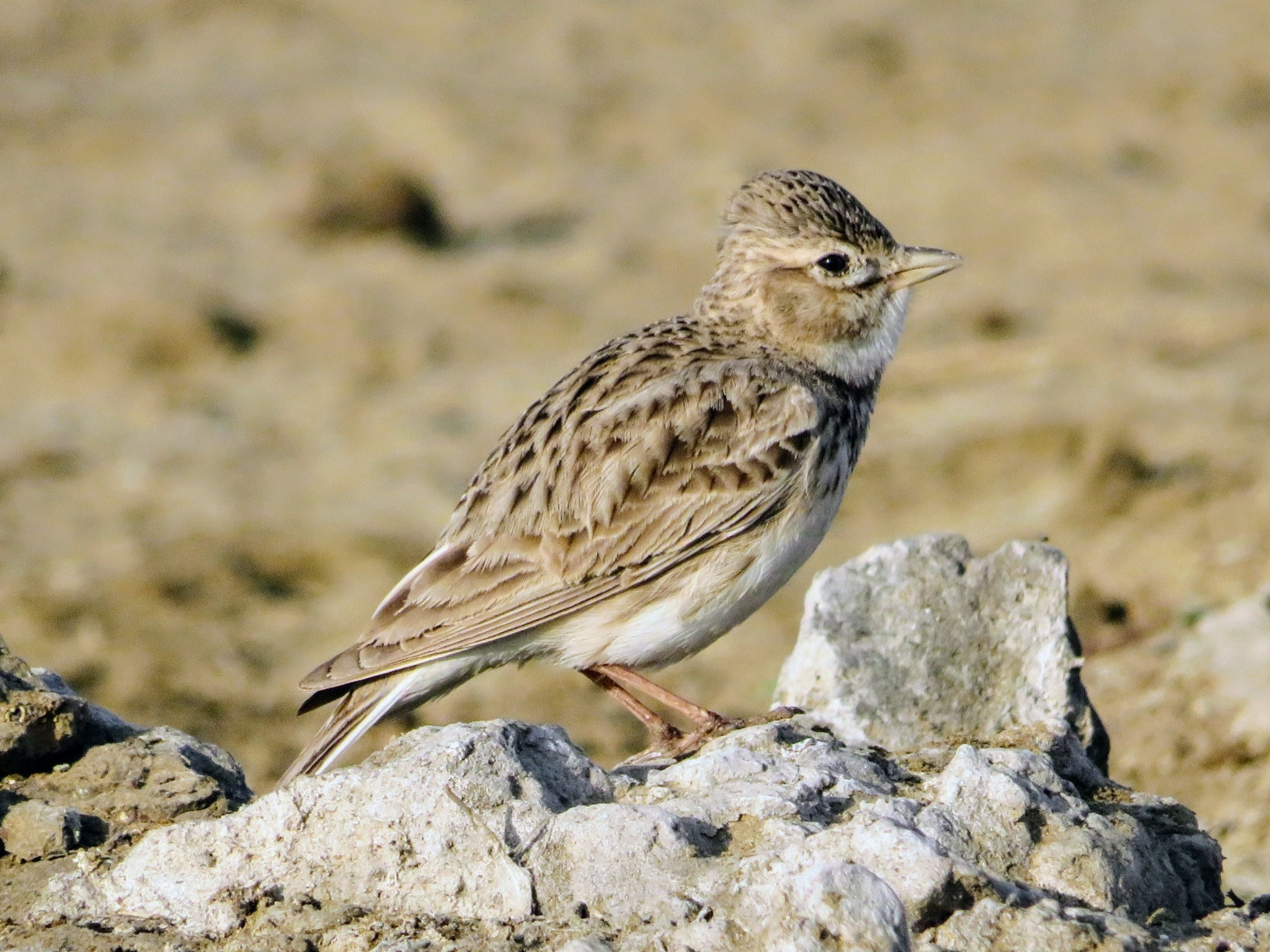
- Adult in its habitat at Dhinchda Lake

Conservation status
- Least Concern (IUCN 3.1)

Scientific classification
- Kingdom: Animalia
- Phylum: Chordata
- Class: Aves
- Order: Passeriformes
- Family: Alaudidae
- Genus: Alaudala
- Species: A. raytal

Binomial name
- Alaudala raytal (Blyth, 1845)
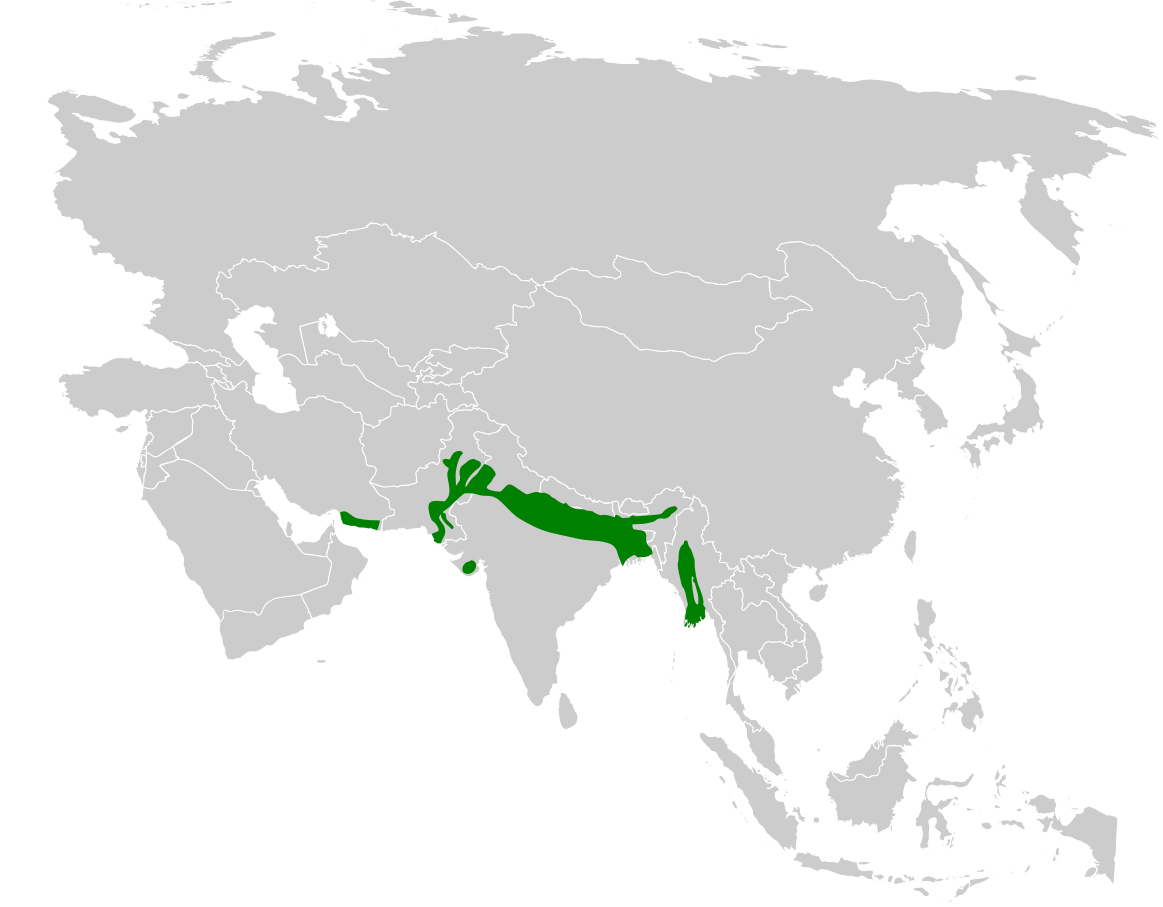

Synonyms
- Alauda raytal; Calandrella raytal

= Sand lark =

Species of bird

The sand lark (Alaudala raytal) is a small passerine bird in the lark family, Alaudidae, found in southern Asia. It is somewhat similar to, but smaller than the short-toed larks.

== Taxonomy and systematics ==
The sand lark was originally assigned to the genus Alauda. It was later placed in the genus Calandrella until it was moved back to Alaudala in 2014 although not all authorities have recognized this change yet. The alternate name Asian short-toed lark is usually used to refer to the species of the same name, Alaudala cheleensis. Other alternate names include Ganges sand lark, Indian sand lark and Indian short-toed lark.

=== Subspecies ===
Three subspecies are recognized:

- Indus sand lark (A. r. adamsi) - (Hume, 1871): Found in southeastern Iran, Pakistan, eastern Afghanistan and northwestern India
- A. r. raytal - (Blyth, 1845): Found from north-central India to southern Myanmar
- A. r. krishnakumarsinhji - (Vaurie & Dharmakumarsinhji, 1954): Found in west-central India

== Description ==
The sand lark is about 12 or 13 cm (4.7 or 5.1 in) long. There is considerable geographic variation and three subspecies are recognized. All subspecies are dull brownish grey with faintly streaked upperparts and appears distinctly short-tailed with a fine bill. The bill length varies geographically short and stubby in the western part and long and fine tipped in the eastern part of its range. Subspecies krishnakumarsinhji found around Bhavnagar in Gujarat is greyer above with broad dark streaks on the upper plumage and breast. The lores and supercilium are white as is the area under the eye and the entire underside. The whitish breast has fine streaks in the subspecies other than krishnakumarsinhji and the streaking on the upperparts is faint. The nominate subspecies is found across the Gangetic plains and extends into southern Burma. Subspecies adamsi of West Asia (Iran, Pakistan, Afghanistan) and parts of northwest India is paler. The species name raytal is derived from the Hindi name of retal which is derived from réth, the word for sand.

== Distribution and habitat ==
The species is found across the Gangetic plains, the sandy banks of the Indus, Brahmaputra, Irrawaddy and Chindwin Rivers. It is also found along the Narmada River but is much rarer there. It is found mainly on sandy islands along rivers and nearby fields. They also occur on coastal dunes and dry mud-flats.

== Behaviour and ecology ==
The sand lark is usually found singly, in pairs or in small loose groups. They forage by making sudden zigzag spurts on the sandy banks near water, feeding on insects as well as seeds.

The breeding season is February to May. The song is varied and consists of rattling and tinkling notes high in the air followed by a series of dry rattling and whistled notes while descending lower. The flight includes soaring followed by rapid wing flapping and pauses before parachuting down in a series of steps with glides while the wing and tail are held spread out. In the last stage of the descent it dives vertically before perching on a clod. They may also sing while perched on the ground, often with a slightly raised crest. Calls of other birds are also incorporated into the song. The usual call notes is a clear tinkling chissip. The nest is a deep cup placed on the ground in a patch of vegetation on the sand. The usual clutch consists of three greyish white eggs which are speckled in brown.

== Gallery ==
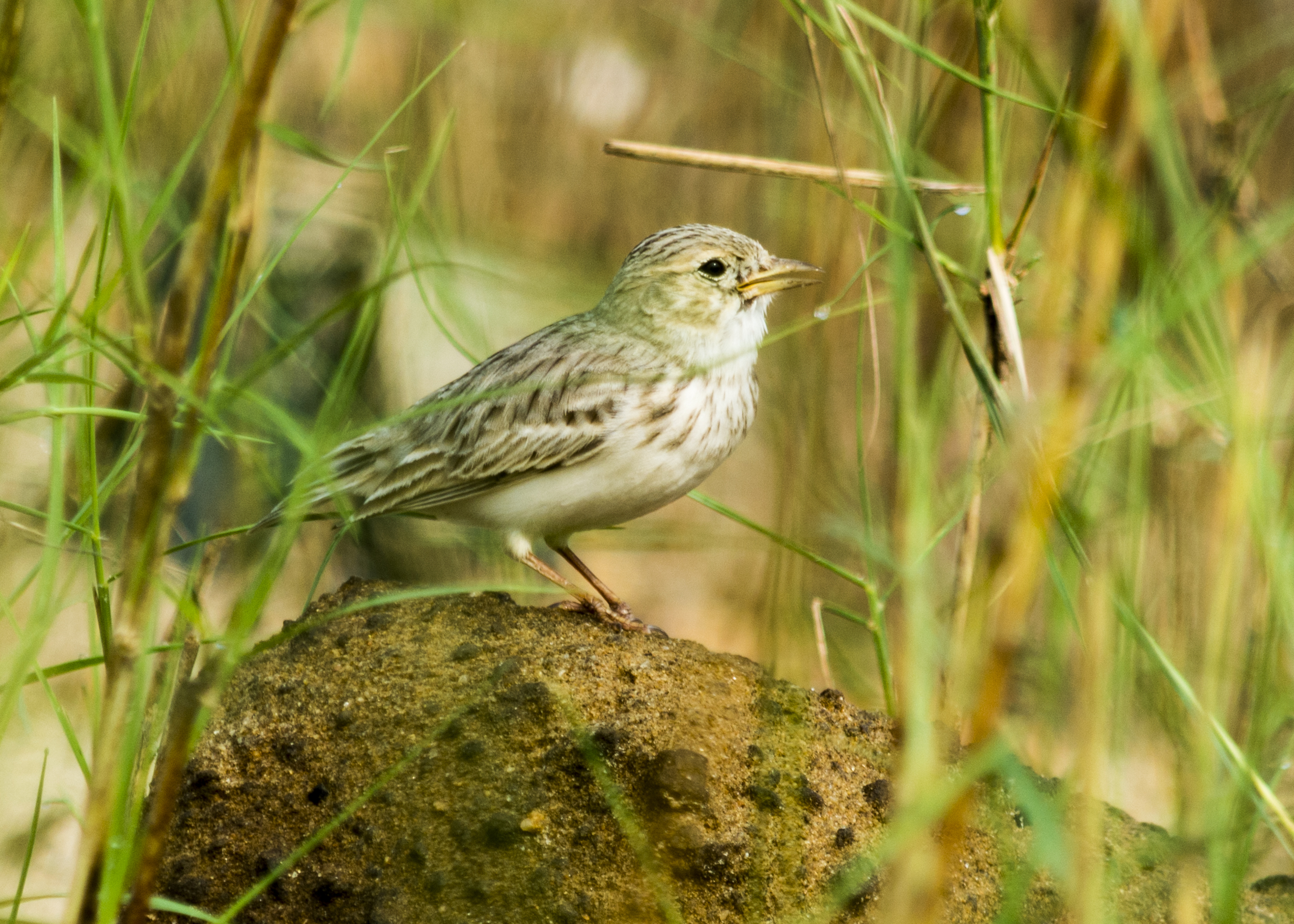
Sand Lark Juvenile at Durgapur Barrage, West Bengal

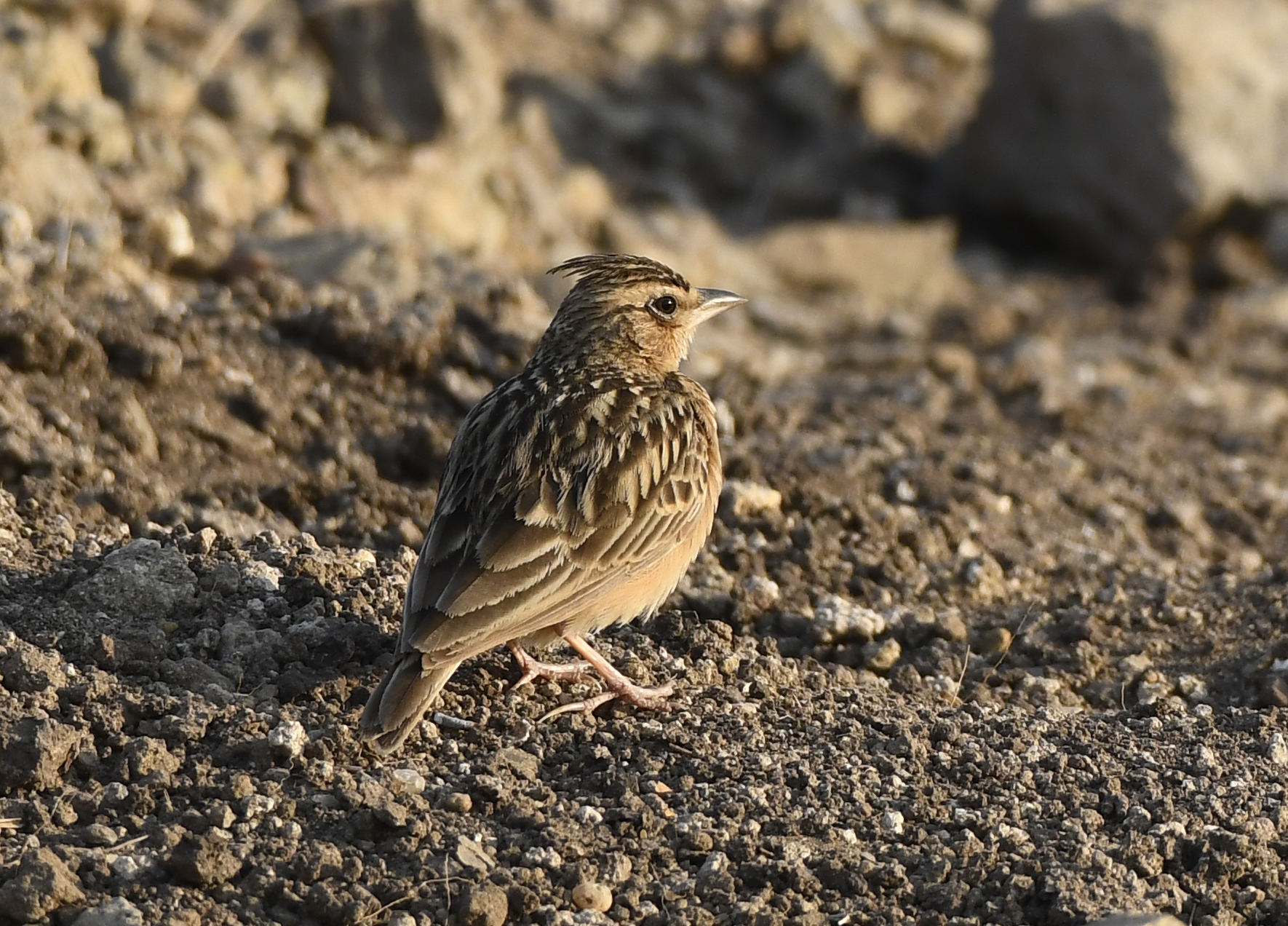
Sand Lark adult at Jamnagar, Gujarat, India

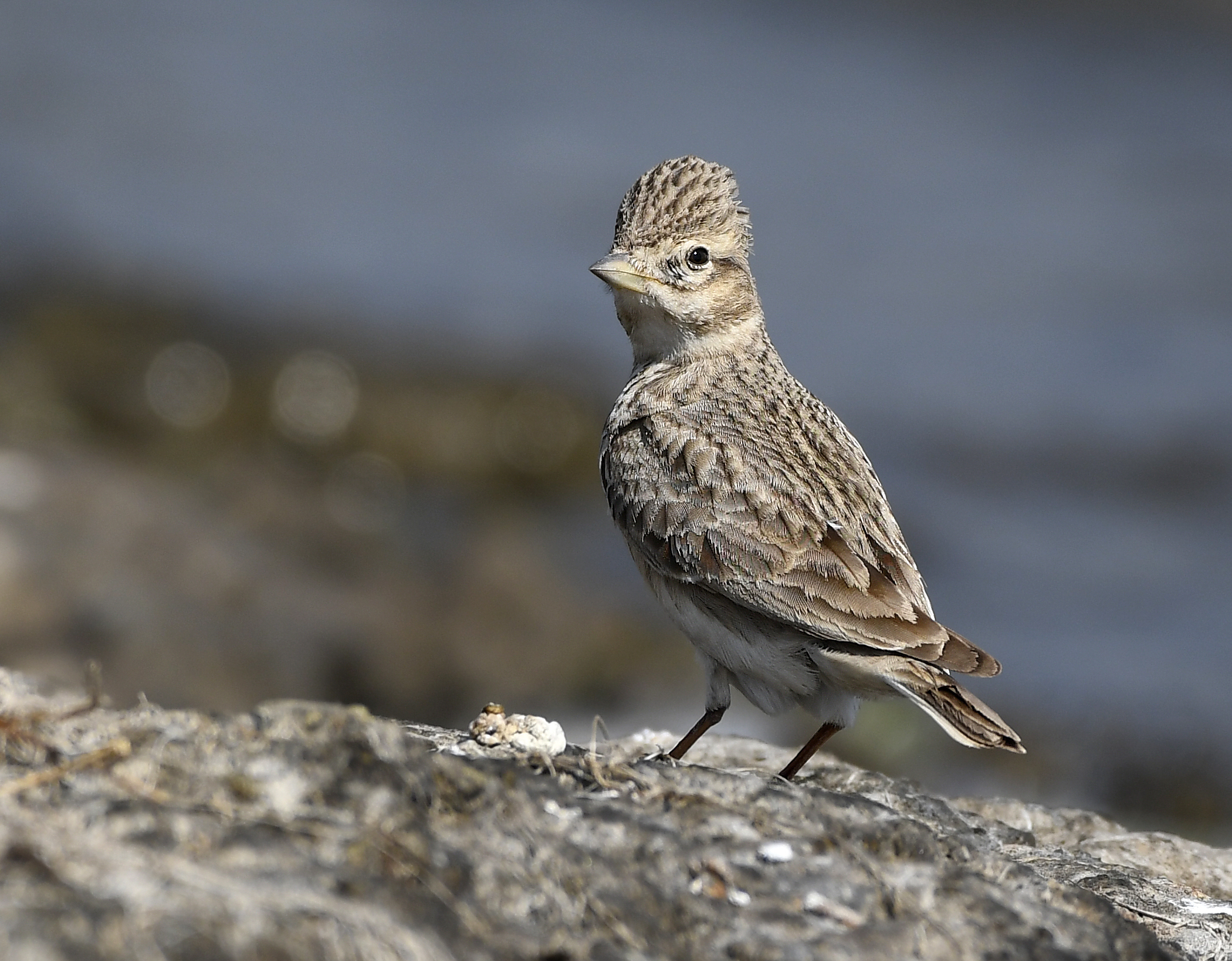
Sand Lark with crest raised at Jamnagar, Gujarat, India

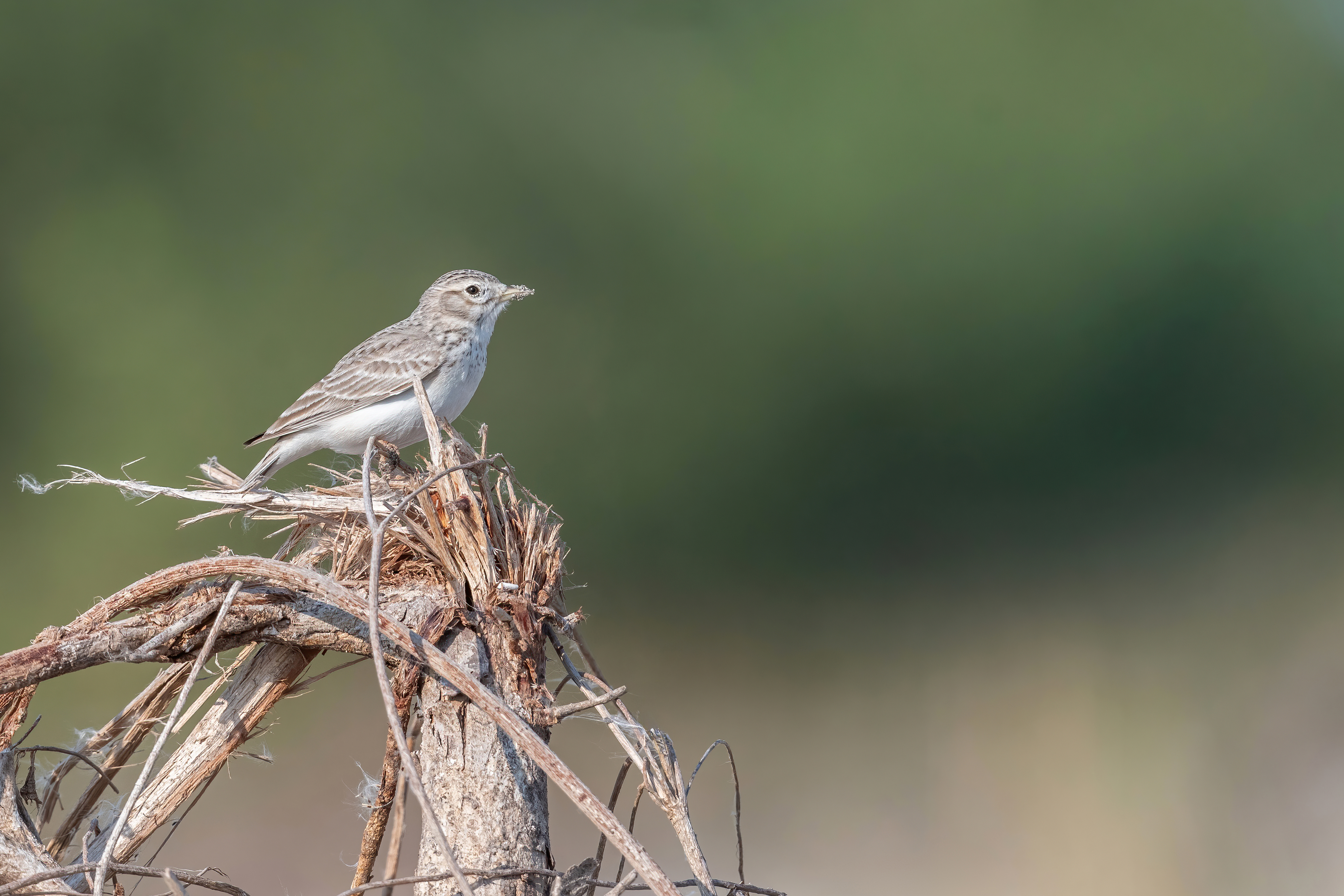
In Koshi Tappu Wildlife Reserve, Nepal
