= Eastern short-toed lark =

Eastern short-toed lark may refer to:

- Mongolian short-toed lark, Calandrella dukhunensis
- The steppe subspecies of the greater short-toed lark, Calandrella brachydactyla longipennis
- Asian short-toed lark, Alaudala cheleensis
