= List of birds of England =

This is a list of the bird species recorded in England. The avifauna of England include a total of 625 species, of which 14 have been introduced by humans.

This list's taxonomic treatment (designation and sequence of orders, families and species) and nomenclature (common and scientific names) follow the conventions of British Ornithologists' Union (BOU). The family accounts at the beginning of each heading reflect this taxonomy, as do the species counts found in each family account. Introduced and accidental species are included in the total counts for England.

The following tags have been used to highlight several categories. The commonly occurring native species do not fall into any of these categories.

- (A) Vagrant - a species that rarely occurs in England, generally fewer than ten records per year
- (B) No records since before 1 January 1950
- (C) Introduced - a species introduced to England as a consequence, direct or indirect, of human actions

== Ducks, geese, and swans ==
Order: Anseriformes Family: Anatidae

Anatidae includes the ducks and most duck-like waterfowl, such as geese and swans. These birds are adapted to an aquatic existence with webbed feet, flattened bills, and feathers that are excellent at shedding water due to an oily coating.

- Brent goose, Branta bernicla
- Red-breasted goose, Branta ruficollis (A)
- Canada goose, Branta canadensis (A, C)
- Cackling goose, Branta hutchinsii (A)
- Barnacle goose, Branta leucopsis
- Snow goose, Anser caerulescens (A)
- Greylag goose, Anser anser
- Taiga bean goose, Anser fabalis
- Pink-footed goose, Anser brachyrhynchus
- Tundra bean goose, Anser serrirostris
- White-fronted goose, Anser albifrons
- Lesser white-fronted goose, Anser erythropus (A)
- Mute swan, Cygnus olor
- Bewick's swan, Cygnus columbianus
- Whooper swan, Cygnus cygnus
- Egyptian goose, Aloochen aegyptiaca (C)
- Shelduck, Tadorna tadorna
- Ruddy shelduck, Tadorna ferruginea (B, C)
- Mandarin duck, Aix galericulata (C)
- Garganey, Spatula querquedula
- Blue-winged teal, Spatula discors (A)
- Shoveler, Spatula clypeata
- Gadwall, Mareca strepera
- Wigeon, Mareca penelope
- American wigeon, Mareca americana (A)
- Mallard, Anas platyrhynchos
- Black duck, Anas rubripes (A)
- Pintail, Anas acuta
- Eurasian teal, Anas crecca
- Green-winged teal, Anas carolinensis (A)
- Red-crested pochard, Netta rufina (A, C)
- Canvasback, Aythya valisineria (A)
- Redhead, Aythya americana
- Pochard, Aythya ferina
- Ferruginous duck, Aythya nyroca (A)
- Ring-necked duck, Aythya collaris (A)
- Tufted duck, Aythya fuligula
- Scaup, Aythya marila
- Lesser scaup, Aythya affinis (A)
- Steller's eider, Polysticta stelleri (A)
- King eider, Somateria spectabilis (A)
- Eider, Somateria mollissima
- Harlequin duck, Histrionicus histrionicus (A)
- Surf scoter, Melanitta perspicillata (A)
- Velvet scoter, Melanitta fusca
- Common scoter, Melanitta nigra
- Black scoter, Melanitta americana
- Long-tailed duck, Clangula hyemalis
- Bufflehead, Bucephala albeola
- Goldeneye, Bucephala clangula
- Barrow's goldeneye, Bucephala islandica (A)
- Smew, Mergellus albellus
- Hooded merganser, Lophodytes cucullatus (A)
- Goosander, Mergus merganser
- Red-breasted merganser, Mergus serrator
- Ruddy duck, Oxyura jamaicensis (C)

== Pheasants, grouse, and allies ==
Order: Galliformes Family: Phasianidae

These are terrestrial species of gamebirds, feeding and nesting on the ground. They are variable in size but generally plump, with broad and relatively short wings.

- Red grouse, Lagopus scotica
- Ptarmigan, Lagopus muta
- Capercaillie, Tetrao urogallus (B, C)
- Black grouse, Tetrao tetrix
- Grey partridge, Perdix perdix
- Golden pheasant, Chrysolophus pictus (C; extinct)
- Lady Amherst's pheasant, Chrysolophus amherstiae (C; extinct)
- Pheasant, Phasianus colchicus (C)
- Quail, Coturnix coturnix
- Red-legged partridge, Alectorix rufa (C)

== Nightjars and allies ==
Order: Caprimulgiformes Family: Caprimulgidae

Nightjars are medium-sized nocturnal birds that usually nest on the ground. They have long wings, short legs and very short bills. Most have small feet, of little use for walking, and long pointed wings. Their soft plumage is camouflaged to resemble bark or leaves.

- Common nighthawk, Chordeiles minor (A)
- Red-necked nightjar, Caprimulgus ruficollis (A)
- Nightjar, Caprimulgus europaeus
- Egyptian nightjar, Caprimulgus aegyptius (A)

== Swifts ==
Order: Apodiformes Family: Apodidae

Swifts are small birds which spend the majority of their lives flying. These birds have very short legs and never settle voluntarily on the ground, perching instead only on vertical surfaces. Many swifts have long swept-back wings which resemble a crescent or boomerang.

- White-throated needletail, Hirundapus caudacutus (A)
- Chimney swift, Chaetura pelagica (A)
- Alpine swift, Apus melba (A)
- Swift, Apus apus
- Pallid swift, Apus pallidus (A)
- Pacific swift, Apus pacificus (A)
- Little swift, Apus affinis (A)

== Bustards ==
Order: Otidiformes Family: Otididae

Bustards are large terrestrial birds mainly associated with dry open country and steppes in the Old World. They are omnivorous and nest on the ground. They walk steadily on strong legs and big toes, pecking for food as they go. They have long broad wings with "fingered" wingtips and striking patterns in flight. Many have interesting mating displays.

- Great bustard, Otis tarda (A)
- MacQueen's bustard, Chlamydotis macqueenii (B)
- Little bustard, Tetrax tetrax (A)

== Cuckoos ==
Order: Cuculiformes Family: Cuculidae

The family Cuculidae includes cuckoos, roadrunners and anis. These birds are of variable size with slender bodies, long tails and strong legs. The Old World cuckoos are brood parasites.

- Great spotted cuckoo, Clamator glandarius (A)
- Yellow-billed cuckoo, Coccyzus americanus (A)
- Black-billed cuckoo, Coccyzus erythropthalmus (A)
- Cuckoo, Cuculus canorus

== Sandgrouse ==
Order: Pterocliformes Family: Pteroclidae

Sandgrouse have small, pigeon like heads and necks, but sturdy compact bodies. They have long pointed wings and sometimes tails and a fast direct flight. Flocks fly to watering holes at dawn and dusk. Their legs are feathered down to the toes.

- Pallas's sandgrouse, Syrrhaptes paradoxus (A)

== Pigeons and doves ==
Order: Columbiformes Family: Columbidae

Pigeons and doves are stout-bodied birds with short necks and short slender bills with a fleshy cere.

- Rock dove, Columba livia
- Stock dove, Columba oenas
- Woodpigeon, Columba palumbus
- Turtle dove, Streptopelia turtur
- Oriental turtle dove, Streptopelia orientalis (A)
- Collared dove, Streptopelia decaocto

== Rails, gallinules, and coots ==
Order: Gruiformes Family: Rallidae

Rallidae is a large family of small to medium-sized birds which includes the rails, crakes, coots and gallinules. Typically they inhabit dense vegetation in damp environments near lakes, swamps or rivers. In general they are shy and secretive birds, making them difficult to observe. Most species have strong legs and long toes which are well adapted to soft uneven surfaces. They tend to have short, rounded wings and to be weak fliers.

- Water rail, Rallus aquaticus
- Corncrake, Crex crex
- Sora crake, Porzana carolina (A)
- Spotted crake, Porzana porzana
- Moorhen, Gallinula chloropus
- Coot, Fulica atra
- American coot, Fulica americana (A)
- Allen's gallinule, Porphyrio alleni (A)
- Purple gallinule, Porphyrio martinica (A)
- Western swamphen, Porphyrio porphyrio (A)
- Baillon's crake, Zapornia pusilla (A)
- Little crake, Zapornia parva (A)

== Cranes ==
Order: Gruiformes Family: Gruidae

Cranes are large, long-legged and long-necked birds. Unlike the similar-looking but unrelated herons, cranes fly with necks outstretched, not pulled back. Most have elaborate and noisy courting displays or "dances".

- Sandhill crane, Antigone canadensis (A)
- Crane, Grus grus

== Grebes ==
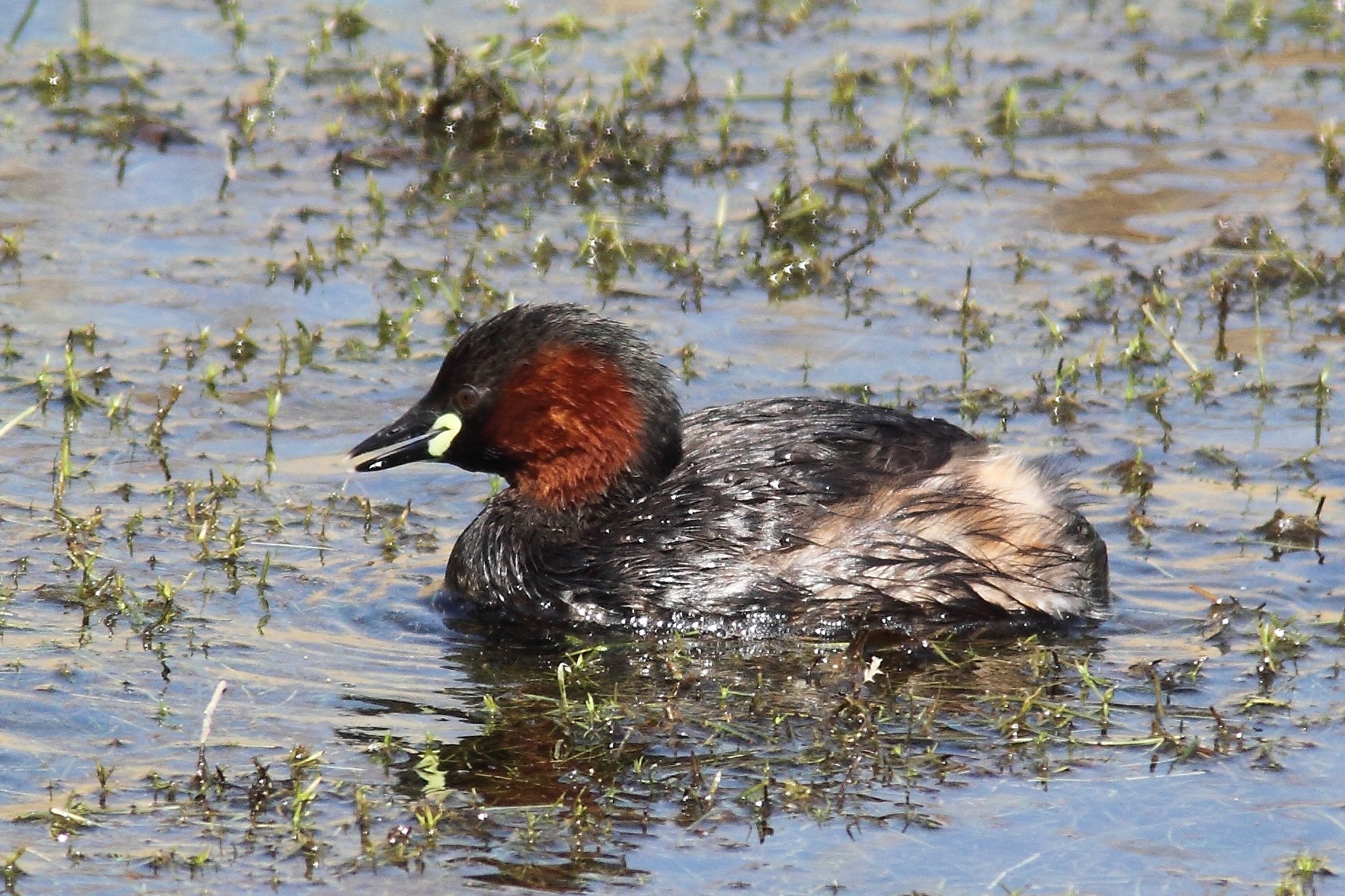
Little grebe

Order: Podicipediformes Family: Podicipedidae

Grebes are small to medium-large freshwater diving birds. They have lobed toes and are excellent swimmers and divers. However, they have their feet placed far back on the body, making them quite ungainly on land.

- Little grebe, Tachybaptus ruficollis
- Pied-billed grebe, Podilymbus podiceps (A)
- Red-necked grebe, Podiceps grisegena
- Great crested grebe, Podiceps cristatus
- Slavonian grebe, Podiceps auritus
- Black-necked grebe, Podiceps nigricollis

== Stone-curlews ==
Order: Charadriiformes Family: Burhinidae

The stone-curlews are a group of largely tropical waders in the family Burhinidae. They are found worldwide within the tropical zone, with some species also breeding in temperate Europe and Australia. They are medium to large waders with strong black or yellow-black bills, large yellow eyes and cryptic plumage. Despite being classed as waders, most species have a preference for arid or semi-arid habitats.

- Stone-curlew, Burhinus oedicnemus

== Oystercatchers ==
Order: Charadriiformes Family: Haematopodidae

The oystercatchers are large and noisy plover-like birds, with strong bills used for smashing or prising open molluscs.

- Oystercatcher, Haematopus ostralegus

== Stilts and avocets ==
Order: Charadriiformes Family: Recurvirostridae

Recurvirostridae is a family of large wading birds, which includes the avocets and stilts. The avocets have long legs and long up-curved bills. The stilts have extremely long legs and long, thin, straight bills.

- Black-winged stilt, Himantopus himantopus (A)
- Avocet, Recurvirostra avosetta

== Plovers and lapwings ==
Order: Charadriiformes Family: Charadriidae

The family Charadriidae include the plovers, dotterels and lapwings. They are small to medium-sized birds with compact bodies, short, thick necks and long, usually pointed, wings. They are found in open country worldwide, mostly in habitats near water.

- Lapwing, Vanellus vanellus
- Sociable lapwing, Vanellus gregarius (A)
- Grey-headed lapwing, Vanellus cinereus (A)
- White-tailed lapwing, Vanellus leucurus (A)
- Golden plover, Pluvialis apricaria
- Pacific golden plover, Pluvialis fulva (A)
- American golden plover, Pluvialis dominica (A)
- Grey plover, Pluvialis squatarola
- Ringed plover, Charadrius hiaticula
- Semipalmated plover, Charadrius semipalmatus (A)
- Little ringed plover, Charadrius dubius
- Killdeer, Charadrius vociferus (A)
- Kentish plover, Charadrius alexandrinus
- Lesser sand plover, Charadrius mongolus (A)
- Greater sand plover, Charadrius leschenaultii (A)
- Caspian plover, Charadrius asiaticus (A)
- Dotterel, Charadrius morinellus

== Sandpipers and allies ==
Order: Charadriiformes Family: Scolopacidae

Scolopacidae is a large diverse family of small to medium-sized shorebirds including the sandpipers, curlews, godwits, shanks, tattlers, woodcocks, snipes, dowitchers and phalaropes. The majority of these species eat small invertebrates picked out of the mud or soil. Variation in length of legs and bills enables multiple species to feed in the same habitat, particularly on the coast, without direct competition for food.

- Upland sandpiper, Bartramia longicauda (A)
- Eurasian whimbrel, Numenius phaeopus
- Hudsonian whimbrel, Numenius hudsonicus (A)
- Little whimbrel, Numenius minutus (A)
- Eskimo curlew, Numenius borealis (A)
- Curlew, Numenius arquata
- Bar-tailed godwit, Limosa lapponica
- Black-tailed godwit, Limosa limosa
- Hudsonian godwit, Limosa haemastica (A)
- Turnstone, Arenaria interpres
- Great knot, Calidris tenuirostris (A)
- Knot, Calidris canutus
- Ruff, Calidris pugnax
- Broad-billed sandpiper, Calidris falcinellus (A)
- Sharp-tailed sandpiper, Calidris acuminata (A)
- Stilt sandpiper, Calidris himantopus (A)
- Curlew sandpiper, Calidris ferruginea
- Temminck's stint, Calidris temminckii
- Long-toed stint, Calidris subminuta (A)
- Red-necked stint, Calidris ruficollis (A)
- Sanderling, Calidris alba
- Dunlin, Calidris alpina
- Purple sandpiper, Calidris maritima
- Baird's sandpiper, Calidris bairdii (A)
- Little stint, Calidris minuta
- Least sandpiper, Calidris minutilla (A)
- White-rumped sandpiper, Calidris fuscicollis (A)
- Buff-breasted sandpiper, Calidris subruficollis
- Pectoral sandpiper, Calidris melanotos
- Semipalmated sandpiper, Calidris pusilla (A)
- Western sandpiper, Calidris mauri (A)
- Long-billed dowitcher, Limnodromus scolopaceus (A)
- Short-billed dowitcher, Limnodromus griseus (A)
- Woodcock, Scolopax rusticola
- Jack snipe, Lymnocryptes minimus
- Great snipe, Gallinago media (A)
- Snipe, Gallinago gallinago
- Wilson's snipe, Gallinago delicata (A)
- Terek sandpiper, Xenus cinereus (A)
- Wilson's phalarope, Phalaropus tricolor (A)
- Red-necked phalarope, Phalaropus lobatus
- Grey phalarope, Phalaropus fulicarius
- Common sandpiper, Actitis hypoleucos
- Spotted sandpiper, Actitis macularius (A)
- Green sandpiper, Tringa ochropus
- Solitary sandpiper, Tringa solitaria (A)
- Lesser yellowlegs, Tringa flavipes (A)
- Redshank, Tringa totanus
- Marsh sandpiper, Tringa stagnatilis (A)
- Wood sandpiper, Tringa glareola
- Spotted redshank, Tringa erythropus
- Greenshank, Tringa nebularia
- Greater yellowlegs, Tringa melanoleuca (A)

== Pratincoles and coursers ==
Order: Charadriiformes Family: Glareolidae

Glareolidae is a family of wading birds comprising the pratincoles, which have short legs, long pointed wings, and long forked tails, and the coursers, which have long legs, short wings, and long, pointed bills which curve downwards.

- Cream-coloured courser, Cursorius cursor (A)
- Collared pratincole, Glareola pratincola (A)
- Oriental pratincole, Glareola maldivarum (A)
- Black-winged pratincole, Glareola nordmanni (A)

== Gulls terns, and skimmers ==
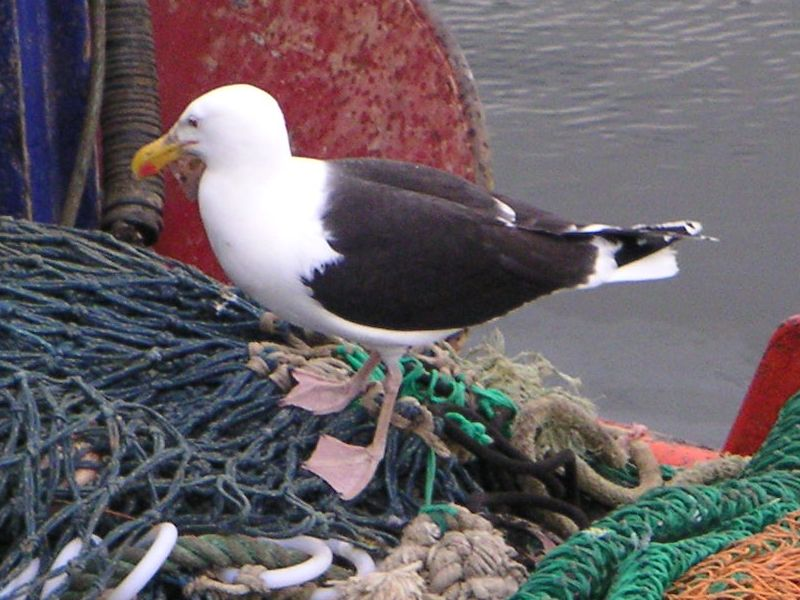
Great black-backed gull

Order: Charadriiformes Family: Laridae

Laridae is a family of medium to large seabirds, the gulls, terns, and skimmers. Gulls are typically grey or white, often with black markings on the head or wings. They have stout, longish bills and webbed feet. Terns are a group of generally medium to large seabirds typically with grey or white plumage, often with black markings on the head. Most terns hunt fish by diving but some pick insects off the surface of fresh water. Terns are generally long-lived birds, with several species known to live in excess of 30 years.

- Kittiwake, Rissa tridactyla
- Ivory gull, Pagophila eburnea (A)
- Sabine's gull, Xema sabini
- Slender-billed gull, Chroicocephalus genei (A)
- Bonaparte's gull, Chroicocephalus philadelphia (A)
- Black-headed gull, Chroicocephalus ridibundus
- Little gull, Hydrocoloeus minutus
- Ross's gull, Rhodostethia rosea (A)
- Laughing gull, Leucophaeus atricilla (A)
- Franklin's gull, Leucophaeus pipixcan (A)
- Audouin's gull, Ichthyaetus audouinii (A)
- Mediterranean gull, Ichthyaetus melanocephalus
- Pallas's gull, Ichthyaetus ichthyaetus (A)
- Black-tailed gull, Larus crassirostris (A)
- Common gull, Larus canus
- Ring-billed gull, Larus delawarensis
- Great black-backed gull, Larus marinus
- Glaucous-winged gull, Larus glaucescens (A)
- Glaucous gull, Larus hyperboreus
- Iceland gull, Larus glaucoides
- Herring gull, Larus argentatus
- Caspian gull, Larus cachinnans
- Yellow-legged gull, Larus michahellis
- Slaty-backed gull, Larus schistisagus (A)
- Lesser black-backed gull, Larus fuscus
- Kelp gull, Larus dominicanus
- Gull-billed tern, Gelochelidon nilotica (A)
- Caspian tern, Hydroprogne caspia (A)
- Royal tern, Thalasseus maximus (A)
- Lesser crested tern, Thalasseus bengalensis (A)
- Sandwich tern, Thalasseus sandvicensis
- Little tern, Sternula albifrons
- Least tern, Sternula antillarum (A)
- Aleutian tern, Onychoprion aleuticus (A)
- Bridled tern, Onychoprion anaethetus (A)
- Sooty tern, Onychoprion fuscatus (A)
- Roseate tern, Sterna dougallii
- Common tern, Sterna hirundo
- Arctic tern, Sterna paradisaea
- Forster's tern, Sterna forsteri (A)
- Whiskered tern, Chlidonias hybrida (A)
- White-winged black tern, Chlidonias niger (A)
- Black tern, Chlidonias niger

== Skuas ==
Order: Charadriiformes Family: Stercorariidae

The family Stercorariidae are, in general, medium to large birds, typically with grey or brown plumage, often with white markings on the wings. They nest on the ground in temperate and arctic regions and are long-distance migrants.

- South polar skua, Stercorarius maccormicki (A)
- Great skua, Stercorarius skua
- Pomarine skua, Stercorarius pomarinus
- Arctic skua, Stercorarius parasiticus
- Long-tailed skua, Stercorarius longicaudus

== Auks, guillemots, and puffins ==
Order: Charadriiformes Family: Alcidae

Alcids are superficially similar to penguins due to their black-and-white plumage, their upright posture and some of their habits, however they are not related to the penguins and differ in being able to fly. Auks live on the open sea, only deliberately coming ashore to nest.

- Little auk, Alle alle
- Brünnich's guillemot, Uria lomvia (A)
- Common guillemot, Uria aalge
- Razorbill, Alca torda
- Great auk, Pinguinus impennis (B [Extinct])
- Black guillemot, Cepphus grylle
- Long-billed murrelet, Brachyramphus perdix (A)
- Ancient murrelet, Synthliboramphus antiquus (A)
- Puffin, Fratercula arctica
- Tufted puffin, Fratercula cirrhata (A)

== Tropicbirds ==
Order: Phaethontiformes Family: Phaethontidae

Tropicbirds are slender white birds of tropical oceans, with exceptionally long central tail feathers. Their heads and long wings have black markings.

- Red-billed tropicbird, Phaethon aethereus (A)

== Divers ==
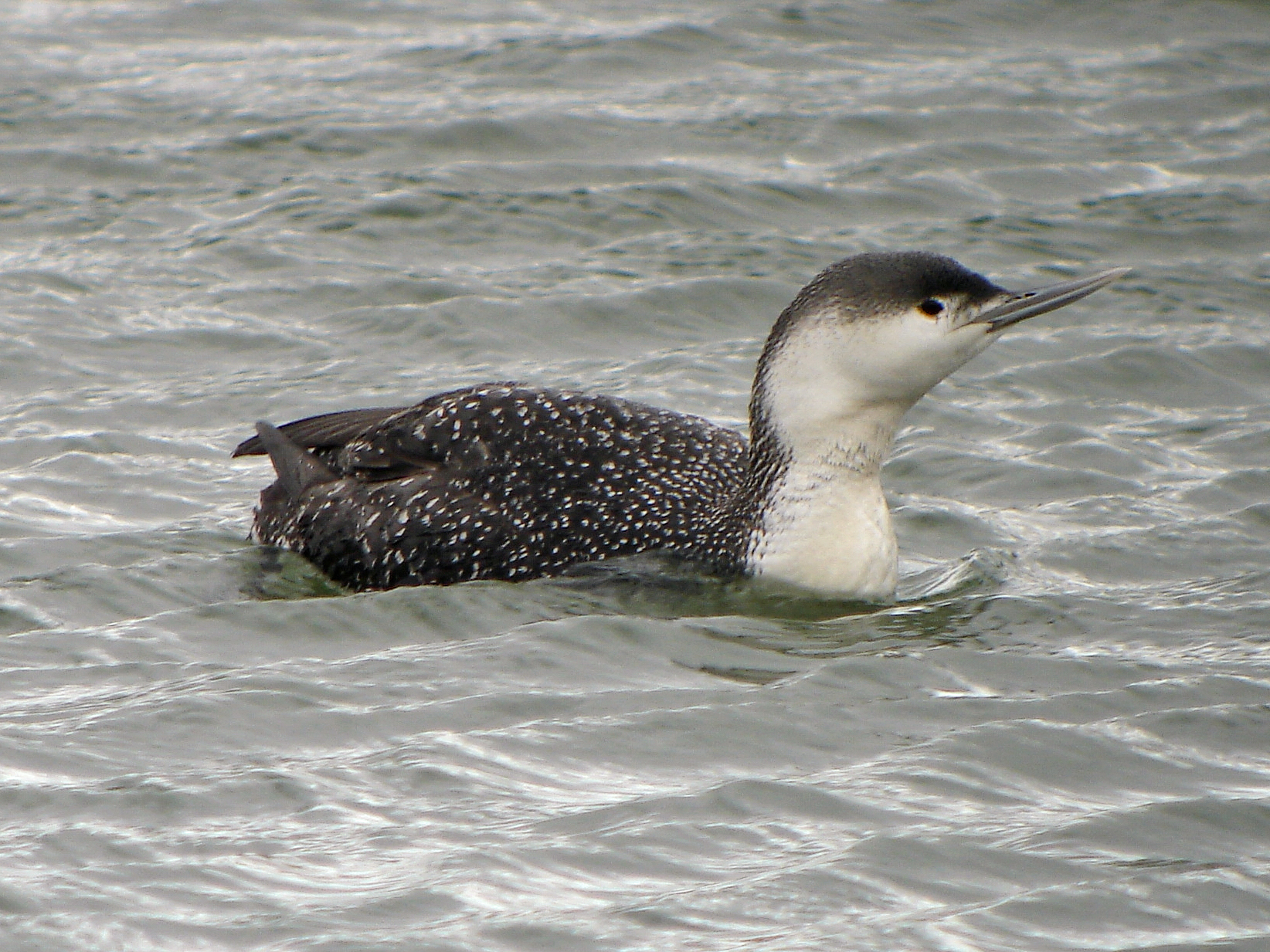
Red-throated diver

Order: Gaviiformes Family: Gaviidae

Divers, known as loons in North America, are a group of aquatic birds found in many parts of northern Eurasia and North America. They are the size of a large duck or small goose, which they somewhat resemble when swimming, but to which they are completely unrelated.

- Red-throated diver, Gavia stellata
- Black-throated diver, Gavia arctica
- Great northern diver, Gavia immer
- White-billed diver, Gavia adamsii (A)

== Southern storm petrels ==
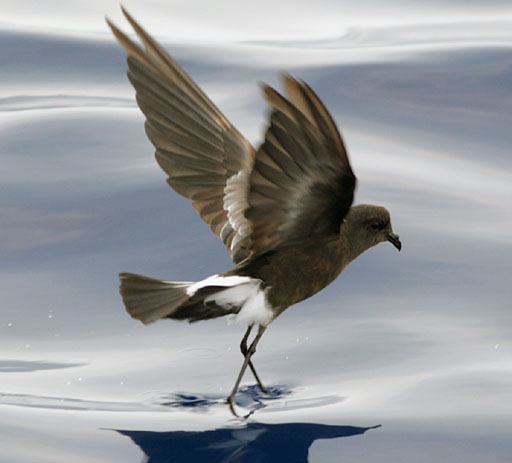
Wilson's storm petrel

Order: Procellariiformes Family: Oceanitidae

The austral storm petrels are relatives of the petrels and are the smallest seabirds. They feed on planktonic crustaceans and small fish picked from the surface, typically while hovering.

- Wilson's petrel, Oceanites oceanicus

== Albatrosses ==
Order: Procellariiformes Family: Diomedeidae

The albatrosses are among the largest of flying birds, and the great albatrosses from the genus Diomedea have the largest wingspans of any extant birds.

- Black-browed albatross, Thalassarche melanophris (A)

== Northern storm petrels ==
Order: Procellariiformes Family: Hydrobatidae

The northern storm petrels are relatives of the petrels and are the smallest seabirds. They feed on planktonic crustaceans and small fish picked from the surface, typically while hovering. The flight is fluttering and sometimes bat-like.

- Storm petrel, Hydrobates pelagicus
- Swinhoe's petrel, Hydrobates monorhis (A)
- Leach's petrel, Hydrobates leucorhoa

== Petrels and shearwaters ==
Order: Procellariiformes Family: Procellaridae

The procellariids are the main group of medium-sized "true petrels", characterised by united nostrils with medium septum and a long outer functional primary.

- Fulmar, Fulmarus glacialis
- Fea's petrel, Pterodroma feae (A)
- Soft-plumaged petrel, Pterodroma mollis (A)
- Black-capped petrel, Pterodroma hasitata (A)
- Cory's shearwater, Calonectris borealis
- Scopoli's shearwater, Calonectris diomedea (A)
- Sooty shearwater, Ardenna griseus
- Great shearwater, Ardenna gravis
- Manx shearwater, Puffinus puffinus
- Balearic shearwater, Puffinus mauretanicus
- Macaronesian shearwater, Puffinus baroli (A)

== Storks ==
Order: Ciconiiformes Family: Ciconiidae

Storks are large, long-legged, long-necked, wading birds with long, stout bills. Storks are mute, but bill-clattering is an important mode of communication at the nest. Their nests can be large and may be reused for many years. Many species are migratory..

- Black stork, Ciconia nigra (A)
- White stork, Ciconia ciconia

== Frigatebirds ==
Order: Suliformes Family: Fregatidae

Frigatebirds are large seabirds usually found over tropical oceans. They are large, black-and-white or completely black, with long wings and deeply forked tails. The males have coloured inflatable throat pouches. They do not swim or walk and cannot take off from a flat surface. Having the largest wingspan-to-body-weight ratio of any bird, they are essentially aerial, able to stay aloft for more than a week.

- Magnificent frigatebird, Fregata magnificens (A)

== Boobies and gannets ==
Order: Suliformes Family: Sulidae

The sulids comprise the gannets and boobies. Both groups are medium to large coastal seabirds that plunge-dive for fish.

- Gannet, Morus bassanus
- Gannet, Sula leucogaster
- Gannet, Sula sula

== Cormorants and shags ==
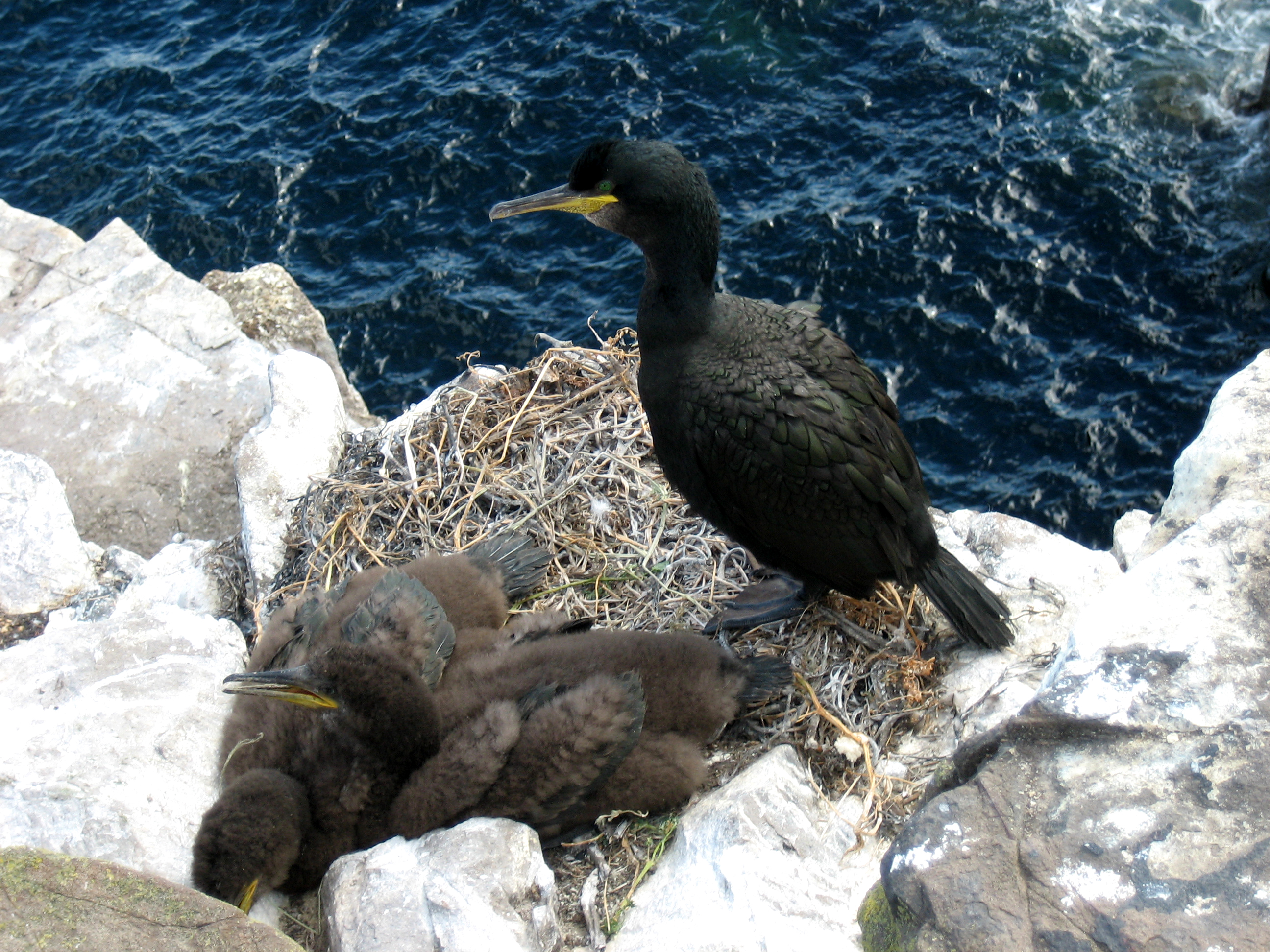
European shag

Order: Suliformes Family: Phalacrocoracidae

Phalacrocoracidae is a family of medium to large coastal, fish-eating seabirds that includes cormorants and shags. Plumage colour varies, with the majority having mainly dark plumage, some species being black-and-white, and a few being colourful.

- Cormorant, Phalacrocorax carbo
- Shag, Gulosus aristotelis
- Double-crested cormorant, Nannopterum auritus (A)

== Pelicans ==
Order: Pelecaniformes Family: Pelecanidae

Pelicans are a group of huge wetland birds with a global warm-temperate to tropical distribution.

- Dalmatian pelican, Pelecanus crispus (A)

== Ibises and spoonbills ==
Order: Pelecaniformes Family: Threskiornithidae

Threskiornithidae is a family of large terrestrial and wading birds which includes the ibises and spoonbills. They have long, broad wings with 11 primary and about 20 secondary feathers. They are strong fliers and despite their size and weight, very capable soarers.

- Glossy ibis, Plegadis falcinellus
- Spoonbill, Platalea leucorodia

== Herons and bitterns ==
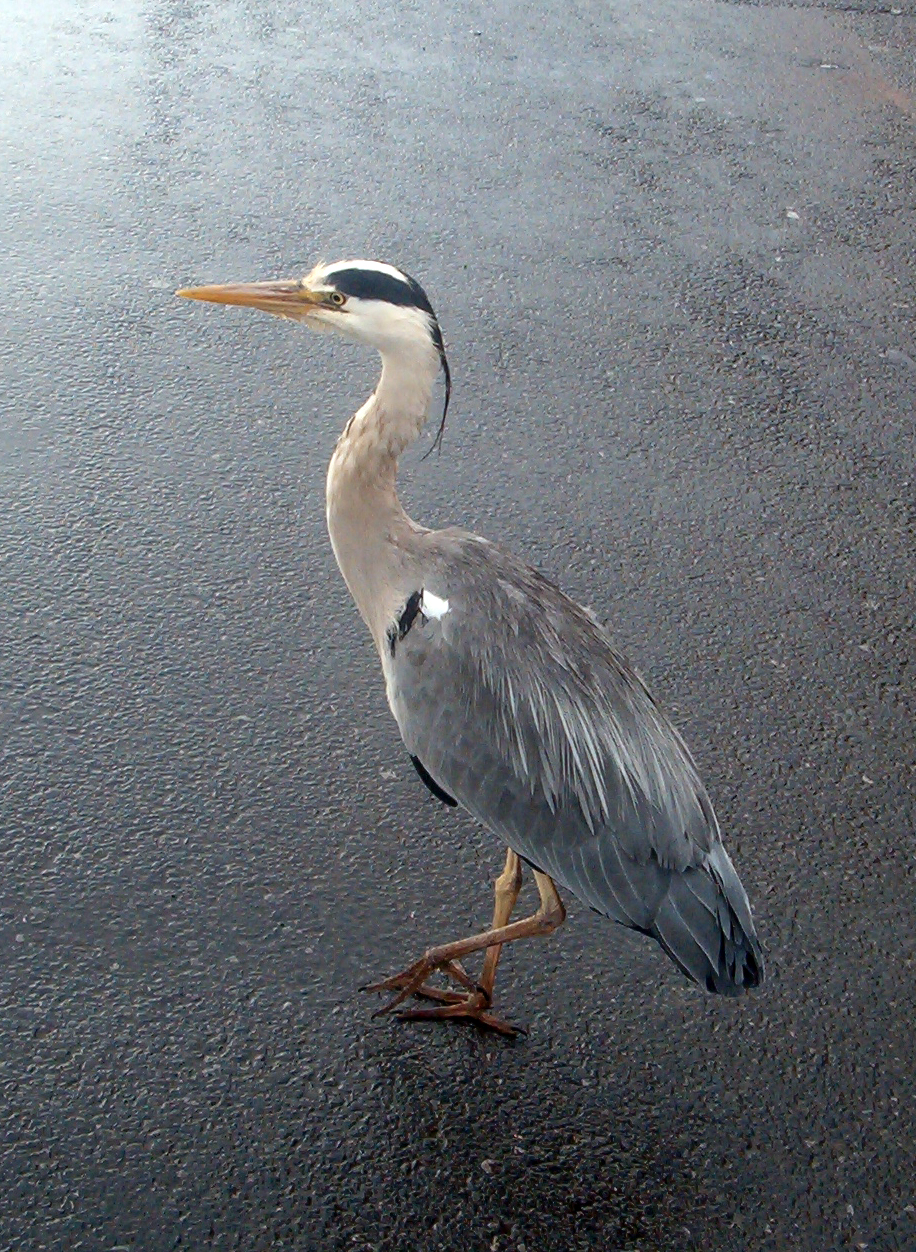
Grey heron

Order: Pelecaniformes Family: Ardeidae

The family Ardeidae contains the bitterns, herons and egrets. Herons and egrets are medium to large wading birds with long necks and legs. Bitterns tend to be shorter necked and more wary. Members of Ardeidae fly with their necks retracted, unlike other long-necked birds such as storks, ibises and spoonbills.

- Bittern, Botaurus stellaris
- American bittern, Botaurus lentiginosus (A)
- Little bittern, Ixobrychus minutus (A)
- Least bittern, Ixobrychus exilis (A)
- Black-crowned night heron, Nycticorax nycticorax (A)
- Green heron, Butorides virescens (A)
- Squacco heron, Ardeola ralloides (A)
- Cattle egret, Bubulcus ibis
- Grey heron, Ardea cinerea
- Great blue heron, Ardea herodias (A)
- Purple heron, Ardea purpurea
- Great white egret, Ardea alba
- Snowy egret, Egretta thula (A)
- Little egret, Egretta garzetta

== Osprey ==
Order: Accipitriformes Family: Pandionidae

The family Pandionidae contains only one species, the osprey. The osprey is a medium-large raptor which is a specialist fish-eater with a worldwide distribution.

- Osprey, Pandion haliaetus

== Hawks, eagles, and kites ==
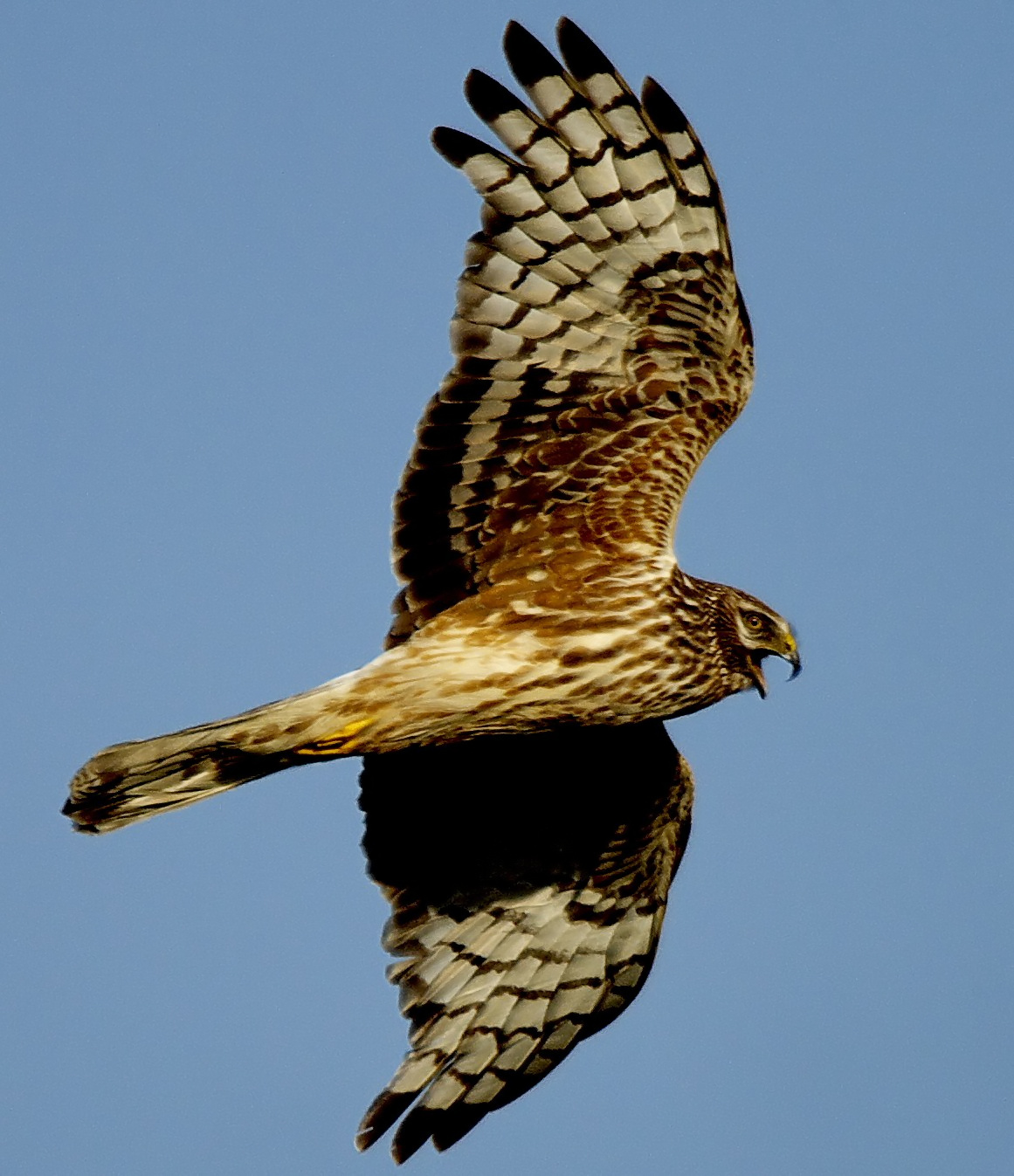
Hen harrier

Order: Accipitriformes Family: Accipitridae

Accipitridae is a family of birds of prey, which includes hawks, eagles, kites, harriers and Old World vultures. These birds have powerful hooked beaks for tearing flesh from their prey, strong legs, powerful talons and keen eyesight.

- Egyptian Vulture, Neophron percnopterus (A)
- Honey-buzzard, Pernis apivorus
- Short-toed eagle, Circaetus gallicus (A)
- Greater spotted eagle, Clanga clanga (B)
- Golden eagle, Aquila chrysaetos
- Sparrowhawk, Accipiter nisus (A)
- Goshawk, Accipiter gentilis
- Marsh Harrier, Circus aeruginosus
- Hen harrier Circus cyaneus
- Pallid harrier Circus macrourus (A)
- Montagu's harrier Circus macrourus
- Red kite, Milvus milvus
- Black kite, Milvus migrans (A)
- White-tailed eagle, Haliaaetus albicilla (A)
- Rough-legged buzzard, Buteo lagopus
- Buzzard, Buteo buteo

== Barn owls ==
Order: Strigiformes Family: Tytonidae

Barn owls are medium to large owls with large heads and characteristic heart-shaped faces. They have long strong legs with powerful talons.

- Western barn owl, Tyto alba

== Owls ==
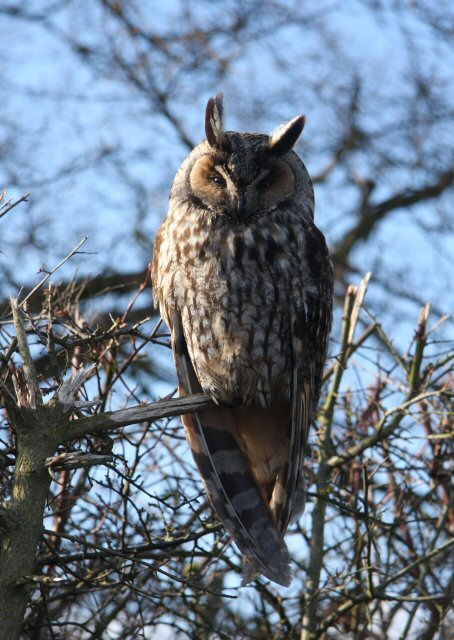
Long-eared owl

Order: Strigiformes Family: Strigidae

The typical owls are small to large solitary nocturnal birds of prey. They have large forward-facing eyes and ears, a hawk-like beak and a conspicuous circle of feathers around each eye called a facial disk.

- Tengmalm's owl, Aegolius funereus (A)
- Little owl, Athene noctua
- Hawk owl, Surnia ulula (A)
- Scops owl, Otus scops (A)
- Long-eared owl, Asio otus
- Short-eared owl, Asio flammeus
- Snowy owl, Bubo scandiaca (A)
- Tawny owl, Strix aluco

== Hoopoes ==
Order: Bucerotiformes Family: Upupidae

Hoopoes have black, white and orangey-pink colouring with a large erectile crest on their head. 1 species occurs in Russia.

- Hoopoe, Upupa epops

== Rollers ==
Order: Coraciiformes Family: Coraciidae

Rollers resemble crows in size and build, but are more closely related to the kingfishers and bee-eaters. They share the colourful appearance of those groups with blues and browns predominating. The two inner front toes are connected, but the outer toe is not.

- Roller, Coracias garrulus

== Kingfishers ==
Order: Coraciiformes Family: Alcedinidae

Kingfishers are medium-sized birds with large heads, long, pointed bills, short legs and stubby tails. There are 5 species which occur in Russia.

- Kingfisher, Alcedo atthis
- Belted kingfisher, Megaceryle alcyon (A)

== Bee-eaters ==
Order: Coraciiformes Family: Meropidae

The bee-eaters are a group of near passerine birds in the family Meropidae. Most species are found in Africa but others occur in southern Europe, Madagascar, Australia and New Guinea. They are characterised by richly coloured plumage, slender bodies and usually elongated central tail feathers. All are colourful and have long downturned bills and pointed wings, which give them a swallow-like appearance when seen from afar.

- Blue-cheeked bee-eater, Merops persicus (A)
- Bee-eater, Merops apiaster

== Woodpeckers ==
Order: Piciformes Family: Picidae

Woodpeckers are small to medium-sized birds with chisel-like beaks, short legs, stiff tails and long tongues used for capturing insects. Some species have feet with two toes pointing forward and two backward, while several species have only three toes. Many woodpeckers have the habit of tapping noisily on tree trunks with their beaks.

- Wryneck, Jynx torquilla
- Yellow-bellied sapsucker, Sphyrapicus varius (A)
- Lesser spotted woodpecker, Dryobates minor
- Great spotted woodpecker, Dendrocopos major
- Green woodpecker, Picus viridis

== Falcons ==
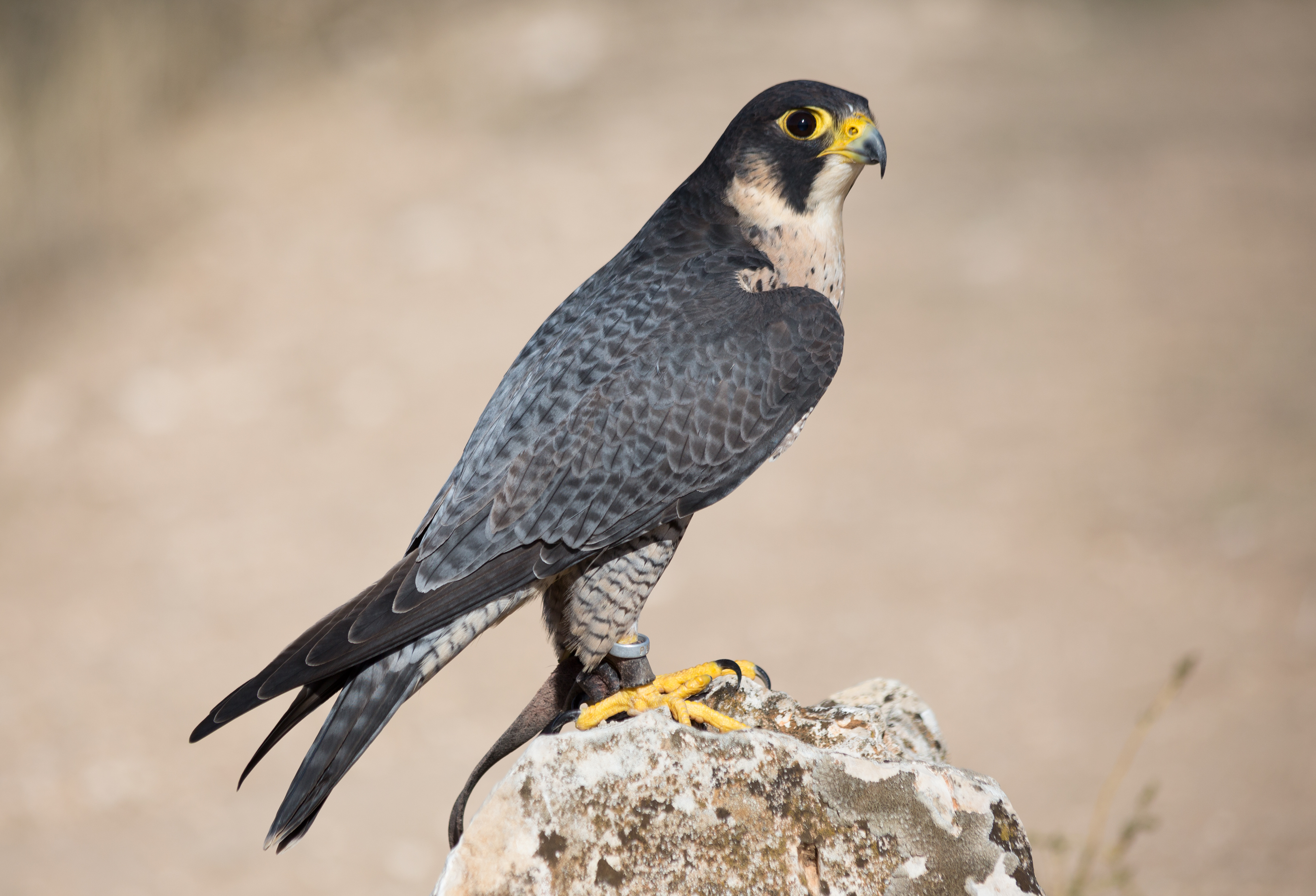
Peregrine falcon

Order: Falconiformes Family: Falconidae

Falconidae is a family of diurnal birds of prey. They differ from hawks, eagles and kites in that they kill with their beaks instead of their talons.

- Lesser kestrel, Falco naumanni (A)
- Kestrel, Falco tinnunculus
- American kestrel, Falco sparverius (A)
- Red-footed falcon, Falco vespertinus (A)
- Amur falcon, Falco amurensis (A)
- Eleonora's falcon, Falco eleonorae (A)
- Merlin, Falco columbarius
- Hobby, Falco subbuteo
- Gyr falcon, Falco rusticolus (A)
- Peregrine falcon, Falco peregrinus

== Parakeets ==
Order: Psittaciformes Family: Psittaculidae

Parakeets are an Old World family of parrots; one species is naturalised from escaped captive birds.

- Rose-ringed parakeet, Psittacula krameri (C)

== Tyrant flycatchers ==
Order: Passeriformes Family: Tyrannidae

Tyrant flycatchers are Passerine birds which occur throughout North and South America. They superficially resemble the Old World flycatchers, but are more robust and have stronger bills. They do not have the sophisticated vocal capabilities of the songbirds. Most, but not all, are rather plain. As the name implies, most are insectivorous.

- Eastern phoebe, Sayornis phoebe (A)
- Acadian flycatcher, Empidonax virescens (A)
- Alder flycatcher, Empidonax alnorum (A)

== Shrikes ==
Order: Passeriformes Family: Laniidae

Shrikes are passerine birds known for their habit of catching other birds and small animals and impaling the uneaten portions of their bodies on thorns. A typical shrike's beak is hooked, like a bird of prey.

- Brown shrike, Lanius cristatus (A)
- Red-backed shrike, Lanius collurio
- Isabelline shrike, Lanius isabellinus (A)
- Lesser grey shrike, Lanius minor (A)
- Great grey shrike, Lanius excubitor
- Southern grey shrike, Lanius meridionalis (A)
- Woodchat shrike, Lanius senator
- Masked shrike, Lanius nubicus (A)

== Vireos, shrike-babblers, and erpornis ==
Order: Passeriformes Family: Vireonidae

The vireos are a group of small to medium-sized passerine birds. They are typically greenish, and resemble wood warblers apart from their heavier bills.

- Yellow-throated vireo, Vireo flavifrons (A)
- Philadelphia vireo, Vireo philadelphicus (A)
- Red-eyed vireo, Vireo olivaceus (A)

== Old World orioles ==
Order: Passeriformes Family: Oriolidae

The Old World orioles are colourful passerine birds. They are not related to the New World orioles.

- Golden oriole, Oriolus oriolus

== Crows, jays, and magpies ==
Order: Passeriformes Family: Corvidae

The family Corvidae includes crows, ravens, jays, choughs, magpies, treepies, nutcrackers and ground jays. Corvids are above average in size among the Passeriformes, and some of the larger species show high levels of intelligence.

- Jay, Garrulus glandarius
- Magpie, Pica pica
- Nutcracker, Nucifraga caryocatactes (A)
- Chough, Pyrrhocorax pyrrhocorax
- Jackdaw, Coloeus monedula
- Rook, Corvus frugilegus
- Carrion crow, Corvus corone
- Hooded crow, Corvus cornix
- Raven, Corvus corax

== Waxwings ==
Order: Passeriformes Family: Bombycillidae

The waxwings are a group of birds with soft silky plumage and unique red tips to some of the wing feathers. In the Bohemian and cedar waxwings, these tips look like sealing wax and give the group its name. These are arboreal birds of northern forests. They live on insects in summer and berries in winter.

- Waxwing, Bombycilla garrulus
- Cedar waxwing, Bombycilla cedrorum (A)

== Tits, chickadees, and titmice ==
Order: Passeriformes Family: Paridae

The Paridae are mainly small stocky woodland species with short stout bills. Some have crests. They are adaptable birds, with a mixed diet including seeds and insects.

- Coal tit, Periparus ater
- Crested tit, Lophophanes cristatus (A)
- Marsh tit, Poecile palustris
- Willow tit, Poecile montana
- Blue tit, Cyanistes caeruleus
- Great tit, Parus major

== Penduline tits ==
Order: Passeriformes Family: Remizidae

Penduline tits are a small Old World family with small, sharp, conical bills.

- Penduline tit, Remiz pendulinus (A)

== Bearded tit ==
Order: Passeriformes Family: Panuridae

This species, the only one in its family, is found in reed beds throughout temperate Europe and Asia.

- Bearded tit, Panurus biarmicus

== Larks ==
Order: Passeriformes Family: Alaudidae

Larks are small terrestrial birds with often extravagant songs and display flights. Most larks are fairly dull in appearance. Their food is insects and seeds.

- Woodlark, Lullula arborea
- White-winged lark, Alauda leucoptera (A)
- Skylark, Alauda arvensis
- Crested lark, Galerida cristata (A)
- Shore Lark, Eremophila alpestris
- Short-toed lark, Calandrella brachydactyla
- Bimaculated lark, Melanocorypha bimaculata (A)
- Calandra lark, Melanocorypha calandra (A)
- Black lark, Melanocorypha yeltoniensis (A)
- Lesser short-toed lark, Calandrella rufescens (A)

== Swallows ==
Order: Passeriformes Family: Hirundinidae

The family Hirundinidae is adapted to aerial feeding. They have a slender streamlined body, long pointed wings and a short bill with a wide gape. The feet are adapted to perching rather than walking, and the front toes are partially joined at the base.

- Sand martin, Riparia riparia
- Tree swallow, Tachycineta bicolor (A)
- Crag martin, Ptyonoprogne rupestris (A)
- Swallow, Hirundo rustica
- House martin, Delichon urbicum
- Red-rumped swallow, Cecropis daurica (A)
- American cliff swallow, Petrochelidon pyrrhonota (A)

== Bush warblers and allies ==
Order: Passeriformes Family: Cettiidae

The members of this family are found throughout Africa, Asia, and Polynesia. Their taxonomy is in flux, and some authorities place some genera in other families.

- Cetti's warbler, Cettia cetti

== Long-tailed tits ==
Order: Passeriformes Family: Aegithalidae

Long-tailed tits are a group of small passerine birds with medium to long tails. They make woven bag nests in trees. Most eat a mixed diet which includes insects.

- Long-tailed tit, Aegithalos caudatus

== Leaf warblers ==
Order: Passeriformes Family: Phylloscopidae

Leaf warblers are a family of small insectivorous birds found mostly in Eurasia and ranging into Wallacea and Africa. The species are of various sizes, often green-plumaged above and yellow below, or more subdued with greyish-green to greyish-brown colours.

- Wood warbler, Phylloscopus sibilatrix
- Western Bonelli's warbler, Phylloscopus bonelli (A)
- Eastern Bonelli's warbler, Phylloscopus orientalis (A)
- Hume's warbler, Phylloscopus humei (A)
- Yellow-browed warbler, Phylloscopus inornatus (A)
- Pallas's warbler, Phylloscopus proregulus (A)
- Radde's warbler, Phylloscopus schwarzi (A)
- Dusky warbler, Phylloscopus fuscatus (A)
- Willow warbler, Phylloscopus trochilus
- Chiffchaff, Phylloscopus collybita
- Iberian chiffchaff, Phylloscopus ibericus (A)
- Green warbler, Phylloscopus nitidus (A)
- Greenish warbler, Phylloscopus trochiloides (A)
- Arctic warbler, Phylloscopus borealis (A)

== Reed warblers and allies ==
Order: Passeriformes Family: Acrocephalidae

The members of this family are usually rather large for "warblers". Most are rather plain olivaceous brown above with much yellow to beige below. They are usually found in open woodland, reedbeds, or tall grass. The family occurs mostly in southern to western Eurasia and surroundings, but it also ranges far into the Pacific, with some species in Africa.

- Great reed warbler, Acrocephalus arundinaceus (A)
- Aquatic warbler, Acrocephalus paludicola
- Sedge warbler, Acrocephalus schoenobaenus
- Paddyfield warbler, Acrocephalus agricola (A)
- Blyth's reed warbler, Acrocephalus dumetorum (A)
- Reed warbler, Acrocephalus scirpaceus
- Marsh warbler, Acrocephalus palustris
- Booted warbler, Iduna caligata (A)
- Sykes's warbler, Arundinax rama (A)
- Eastern olivaceous warbler, Hippolais pallida (A)
- Melodious warbler, Hippolais polyglotta
- Icterine warbler, Hippolais icterina

== Grassbirds and allies ==
Order: Passeriformes Family: Locustellidae

Locustellidae are a family of small insectivorous songbirds found mainly in Eurasia, Africa, and the Australian region. They are smallish birds with tails that are usually long and pointed, and tend to be drab brownish or buffy all over.

- Pallas's grasshopper warbler, Locustella certhiola
- Lanceolated warbler, Locustella lanceolata
- River warbler, Locustella fluviatilis
- Savi's warbler, Locustella luscinioides
- Grasshopper warbler, Locustella naevia

== Cisticolas and allies ==
Order: Passeriformes Family: Cisticolidae

The Cisticolidae are warblers found mainly in warmer southern regions of the Old World. They are generally very small birds of drab brown or grey appearance found in open country such as grassland or scrub.

- Zitting cisticola, Cisticola juncidis

== Sylviid warblers, parrotbills, and allies ==
Order: Passeriformes Family: Sylviidae

The family Sylviidae is a group of small insectivorous passerine birds. They mainly occur as breeding species, as the common name implies, in Europe, Asia and, to a lesser extent, Africa. Most are of generally undistinguished appearance, but many have distinctive songs.

- Blackcap, Sylvia atricapilla
- Garden warbler, Sylvia borin
- Barred warbler, Curruca nisoria
- Lesser whitethroat, Curruca curruca
- Western Orphean warbler, Curruca hortensis
- Eastern Orphean warbler, Curruca crassirostris (A)
- Asian desert warbler, Curruca nana (A)
- Rüppell's warbler, Curruca rueppelli
- Sardinian warbler, Curruca melanocephala
- Western subalpine warbler, Curruca iberiae
- Moltoni's subalpine warbler, Curruca subalpina
- Eastern subalpine warbler, Curruca cantillans
- Whitethroat, Curruca communis
- Spectacled warbler, Curruca conspicillata (A)
- Marmora's warbler, Curruca sarda (A)
- Dartford warbler, Curruca undata

== Kinglets ==
Order: Passeriformes Family: Regulidae

The kinglets, also called crests, are a small group of birds often included in the Old World warblers, but frequently given family status because they also resemble the titmice.

- Firecrest, Regulus ignicapillus
- Goldcrest, Regulus regulus

== Wrens ==
Order: Passeriformes Family: Troglodytidae

The wrens are mainly small and inconspicuous except for their loud songs. These birds have short wings and thin down-turned bills. Several species often hold their tails upright. All are insectivorous.

- Wren, Troglodytes troglodytes

== Nuthatches ==
Order: Passeriformes Family: Sittidae

Nuthatches are small woodland birds. They have the unusual ability to climb down trees head first, unlike other birds which can only go upwards. Nuthatches have big heads, short tails and powerful bills and feet.

- Red-breasted nuthatch, Sitta canadensis (A)
- Nuthatch, Sitta europaea

== Wallcreeper ==
Order: Passeriformes Family: Tichodromidae

The wallcreeper is a small bird related to the nuthatch family, which has stunning crimson, grey and black plumage.

- Wallcreeper, Tichodroma muraria (A)

== Treecreepers ==
Order: Passeriformes Family: Certhiidae

Treecreepers are small woodland birds, brown above and white below. They have thin pointed down-curved bills, which they use to extricate insects from bark. They have stiff tail feathers, like woodpeckers, which they use to support themselves on vertical trees.

- Treecreeper, Certhia familiaris
- Short-toed treecreeper, Certhia brachydactyla (A)

== Mockingbirds and thrashers ==
Order: Passeriformes Family: Mimidae

The mimids are a family of passerine birds which includes thrashers, mockingbirds, tremblers, and the New World catbirds. These birds are notable for their songs, especially their remarkable ability to mimic a wide variety of birds and other sounds heard outdoors. The species tend towards dull greys and browns in their appearance. Four species have been recorded in Massachusetts.

- Grey catbird, Dumetella carolinensis (A)
- Northern mockingbird, Mimus polyglottos (A)
- Brown thrasher, Toxostoma rufum (A)

== Starlings ==
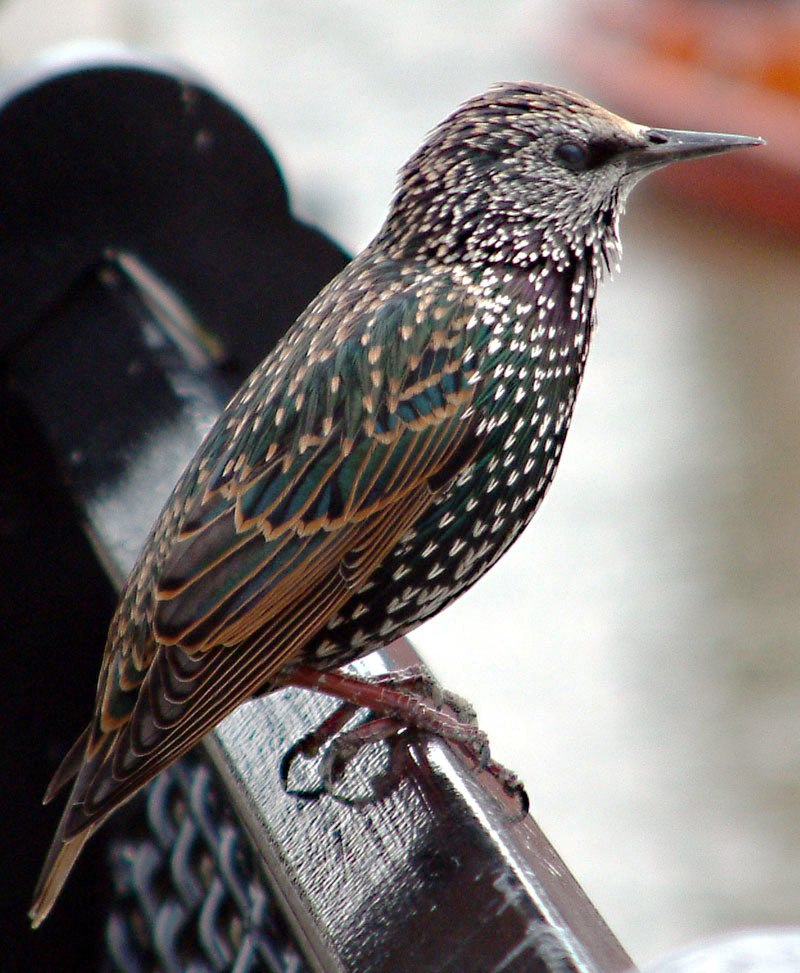
Common starling

Order: Passeriformes Family: Sturnidae

Starlings are small to medium-sized Old World passerine birds with strong feet. Their flight is strong and direct and most are very gregarious. Their preferred habitat is fairly open country, and they eat insects and fruit. The plumage of several species is dark with a metallic sheen.

- Rose-coloured starling, Pastor roseus (A)
- Starling, Sturnus vulgaris

== Thrushes and allies ==
Order: Passeriformes Family: Turdidae

The thrushes are a group of passerine birds that occur mainly in the Old World. They are plump, soft plumaged, small to medium-sized insectivores or sometimes omnivores, often feeding on the ground. Many have attractive songs.

- Varied thrush, Ixoreus naevius (A)
- Wood thrush, Hylocichla mustelina (A)
- Swainson's thrush, Catharus ustulatus (A)
- Hermit thrush, Catharus guttatus (A)
- Grey-cheeked thrush, Catharus minimus (A)
- Veery, Catharus fuscescens (A)
- Song thrush, Turdus philomelos
- Mistle thrush, Turdus viscivorus
- Redwing, Turdus iliacus
- Blackbird, Turdus merula
- Eyebrowed thrush, Turdus obscurus (A)
- Fieldfare, Turdus pilaris
- Ring ouzel, Turdus torquatus
- Black-throated thrush, Turdus atrogularis
- Red-throated thrush, Turdus ruficollis (A)
- Dusky thrush, Turdus eunomus (A)
- Naumann's thrush, Turdus naumanni (A)
- American robin, Turdus migratorius (A)

== Old World flycatchers ==
Order: Passeriformes Family: Muscicapidae

Old World flycatchers are a large group of small passerine birds native to the Old World. They are mainly small arboreal insectivores. The appearance of these birds is highly varied, but they mostly have weak songs and harsh calls.

- Rufous-tailed scrub-robin, Cercotrichas galactotes (A)
- Spotted flycatcher, Muscicapa striata
- Robin, Erithacus rubecula
- Siberian blue robin, Larvivora cyane (A)
- Rufous-tailed robin, Larvivora sibilans (A)
- Bluethroat, Luscinia svecica
- Thrush nightingale, Luscinia luscinia (A)
- Nightingale, Luscinia megarhynchos (A)
- White-throated robin, Irania gutturalis (A)
- Siberian rubythroat, Calliope calliope (A)
- Red-flanked bluetail, Tarsiger cyanurus (A)
- Taiga flycatcher, Ficedula albicilla (A)
- Red-breasted flycatcher, Ficedula parva
- Pied flycatcher, Ficedula hypoleuca
- Atlas flycatcher, Ficedula speculigera (A)
- Collared flycatcher, Ficedula albicollis (A)
- Black redstart, Phoenicurus ochruros
- Redstart, Phoenicurus phoenicurus
- Rock thrush, Monticola saxatilis (A)
- Blue rock thrush, Monticola solitarius (A)
- Whinchat, Saxicola rubetra
- Stonechat, Saxicola rubicola
- Siberian stonechat, Saxicola maurus (A)
- Stejneger's stonechat, Saxicola stejnegeri (A)
- Wheatear, Oenanthe oenanthe
- Isabelline wheatear, Oenanthe isabellina (A)
- Desert wheatear, Oenanthe deserti (A)
- Western black-eared wheatear, Oenanthe hispanica (A)
- Eastern black-eared wheatear, Oenanthe melanoleuca (A)
- Pied wheatear, Oenanthe pleschanka (A)
- White-crowned black wheatear, Oenanthe leucopyga (A)

== Dippers ==
Order: Passeriformes Family: Cinclidae

Dippers are a group of perching birds whose habitat includes aquatic environments in the Americas, Europe and Asia. They are named for their bobbing or dipping movements.

- White-throated dipper, Cinclus cinclus

== Old World sparrows ==
Order: Passeriformes Family: Passeridae

Old World sparrows are small passerine birds. In general, sparrows tend to be small, plump, brown or grey birds with short tails and short powerful beaks. Sparrows are seed eaters, but they also consume small insects.

- Rock sparrow, Petronia petronia (A)
- Tree sparrow, Passer montanus
- Spanish sparrow, Passer hispaniolensis (A)
- House sparrow, Passer domesticus

== Accentors ==
Order: Passeriformes Family: Prunellidae

The accentors are in the only bird family, Prunellidae, which is completely endemic to the Palearctic. They are small, fairly drab species superficially similar to sparrows.

- Alpine accentor, Prunella collaris (A)
- Dunnock, Prunella modularis

== Wagtails and pipits ==
Order: Passeriformes Family: Motacillidae

Motacillidae is a family of small passerine birds with medium to long tails. They include the wagtails, longclaws and pipits. They are slender, ground feeding insectivores of open country.

- Western yellow wagtail, Motacilla flava
- Citrine wagtail, Motacilla citreola (A)
- Grey wagtail, Motacilla cinerea
- Pied Wagtail, Motacilla alba
- Richard's pipit, Anthus richardi
- Blyth's pipit, Anthus godlewskii (A)
- Tawny pipit, Anthus campestris
- Meadow pipit, Anthus pratensis
- Tree pipit, Anthus trivialis
- Olive-backed pipit, Anthus hodgsoni (A)
- Pechora pipit, Anthus gustavi (A)
- Red-throated pipit, Anthus cervinus (A)
- Buff-bellied pipit, Anthus rubescens (A)
- Water pipit, Anthus spinoletta (A)
- Rock pipit, Anthus petrosus

== Finches, euphonias, and allies ==
Order: Passeriformes Family: Fringillidae

Finches are seed-eating passerine birds, that are small to moderately large and have a strong beak, usually conical and in some species very large. All have twelve tail feathers and nine primaries. These birds have a bouncing flight with alternating bouts of flapping and gliding on closed wings, and most sing well.

- Chaffinch, Fringilla coelebs
- Brambling, Fringilla montifringilla (A)
- Hawfinch, Coccothraustes coccothraustes
- Pine grosbeak, Pinicola enucleator (A)
- Bullfinch, Pyrrhula pyrrhula
- Trumpeter finch, Bucanetes githagineus (A)
- Common rosefinch, Carpodacus erythrinus
- Greenfinch, Chloris chloris
- Twite, Linaria flavirostris (A)
- Linnet, Linaria cannabina
- Common redpoll, Acanthis flammea
- Lesser redpoll, Acanthis cabaret
- Arctic redpoll, Acanthis hornemanni (A)
- Parrot crossbill, Loxia pytyopsittacus (A)
- Crossbill, Loxia curvirostra
- Two-barred crossbill, Loxia leucoptera (A)
- Goldfinch, Carduelis carduelis
- Serin, Serinus serinus
- Siskin, Spinus spinus

== Longspurs and arctic buntings ==
Order: Passeriformes Family: Calcariidae

The Calcariidae are a family of birds that had been traditionally grouped with the New World sparrows, but differ in a number of respects and are usually found in open grassy areas.

- Lapland bunting, Calcarius lapponicus
- Snow bunting, Plectrophenax nivalis

== Old World buntings ==
Order: Passeriformes Family: Emberizidae

The emberizids are a large family of passerine birds. They are seed-eating birds with distinctively shaped bills. Many emberizid species have distinctive head patterns.

- Corn bunting, Emberiza calandra
- Yellowhammer, Emberiza citrinella
- Pine bunting, Emberiza leucocephalos (A)
- Rock bunting, Emberiza cia (A)
- Ortolan bunting, Emberiza hortulana
- Cretzschmar's bunting, Emberiza caesia (A)
- Cirl bunting, Emberiza cirlus
- Chestnut-eared bunting, Emberiza fucata (A)
- Little bunting, Emberiza pusilla
- Yellow-browed bunting, Emberiza chrysophrys (A)
- Rustic bunting, Emberiza rustica (A)
- Yellow-breasted bunting, Emberiza aureola (A)
- Black-headed bunting, Emberiza melanocephala (A)
- Black-faced bunting, Emberiza spodocephala
- Pallas's reed bunting, Emberiza pallasi (A)
- Reed bunting, Emberiza schoeniclus

== New World sparrows ==
Order: Passeriformes Family: Passerellidae

Until 2017, these species were considered part of the family Emberizidae. Most of the species are known as sparrows, but these birds are not closely related to the Old World sparrows which are in the family Passeridae. Many of these have distinctive head patterns.

- Lark sparrow, Chondestes grammacus (A)
- Dark-eyed junco, Junco hyemalis (A)
- White-crowned sparrow, Zonotrichia leucophrys (A)
- White-throated sparrow, Zonotrichia albicollis (A)
- Savannah sparrow, Passerculus sandwichensis (A)
- Song sparrow, Melospiza melodia (A)
- Eastern towhee, Pipilo erythrophthalmus (A)

== Troupials and allies ==
Order: Passeriformes Family: Icteridae

The icterids are a group of small to medium-sized, often colourful passerine birds restricted to the New World and include the grackles, New World blackbirds, and New World orioles. Most species have black as a predominant plumage colour, often enlivened by yellow, orange, or red.

- Bobolink, Dolichonyx oryzivorus (A)
- Baltimore oriole, Icterus galbula (A)
- Brown-headed cowbird, Molothrus ater (A)

== New World warblers ==
Order: Passeriformes Family: Parulidae

The wood-warblers are a group of small often colourful passerine birds restricted to the New World. Most are arboreal, but some are more terrestrial. Most members of this family are insectivores.

- Ovenbird, Seiurus aurocapilla (A)
- Northern waterthrush, Parkesia noveboracensis (A)
- Golden-winged warbler, Vermivora chrysoptera (A)
- Black-and-white warbler, Mniotilta varia (A)
- Common yellowthroat, Geothlypis trichas (A)
- Hooded warbler, Setophaga citrina (A)
- American redstart, Setophaga ruticilla (A)
- Northern parula, Setophaga americana (A)
- Magnolia warbler, Setophaga magnolia (A)
- Bay-breasted warbler, Setophaga castanea (A)
- American yellow warbler, Setophaga aestiva (A)
- Chestnut-sided warbler, Setophaga pensylvanica (A)
- Blackpoll warbler, Setophaga striata (A)
- Myrtle warbler, Setophaga coronata (A)
- Wilson's warbler, Cardellina pusilla (A)

== Cardinals and allies ==
Order: Passeriformes Family: Cardinalidae

The cardinals are a family of robust, seed-eating birds with strong bills. They are typically associated with open woodland. The sexes usually have distinct plumages.

- Scarlet tanager, Piranga olivacea (A)

== See also ==
- List of birds
- Lists of birds by region
