= Kenya short-toed lark =

Kenya short-toed lark may refer to:

- Athi short-toed lark, a species of lark found in eastern Africa
- Damara pink-billed lark, a subspecies of lark found in southern Africa
