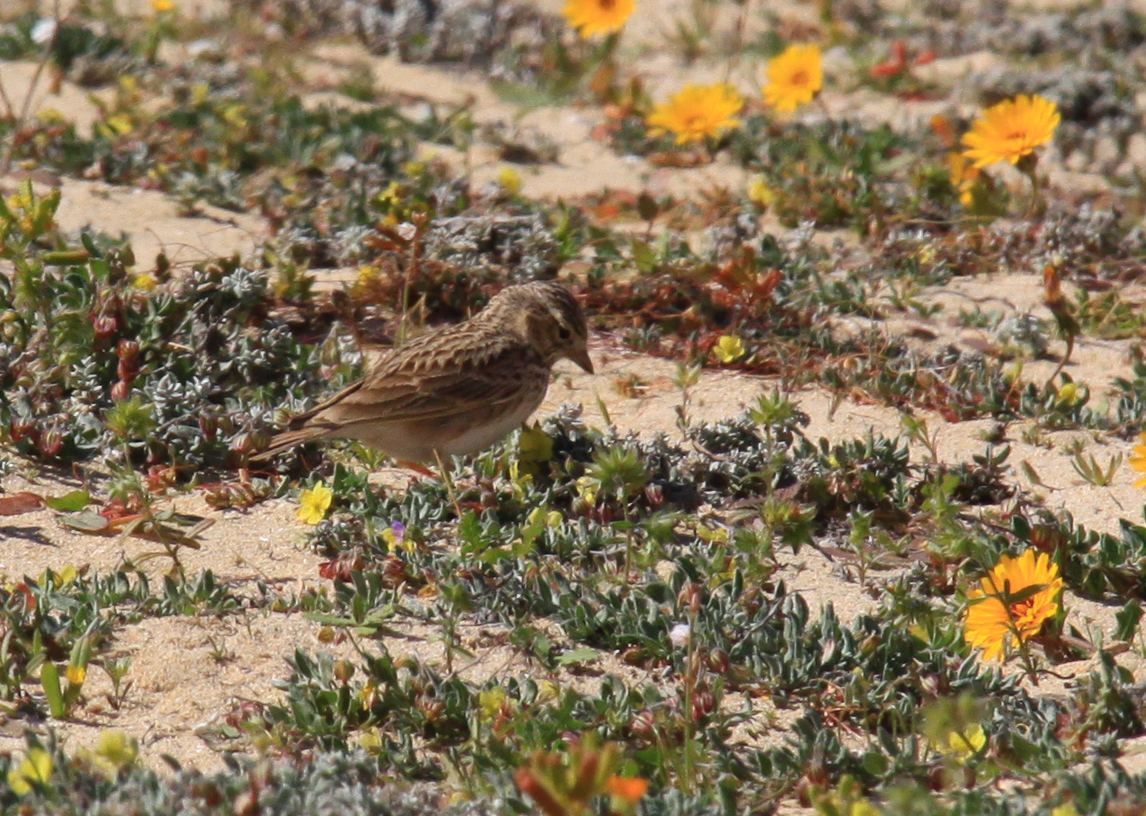
- Mediterranean short-toed lark (Alaudala rufescens)

Scientific classification
- Kingdom: Animalia
- Phylum: Chordata
- Class: Aves
- Order: Passeriformes
- Family: Alaudidae
- Genus: Alaudala; Horsfield & Moore, F, 1858

Type species
- Alauda raytal Blyth, 1844

Species
- see text

= Alaudala =

Genus of birds

Alaudala is a genus of lark in the family Alaudidae. The genus name is a diminutive of Alauda.

== Taxonomy and systematics ==
A molecular phylogenetic study published in 2020 compared the nuclear and mitochondrial DNA from the sand, Asian short-toed, and lesser short-toed larks. The study analysed samples from 130 individuals that represented 16 of the 18 recognised subspecies. The resulting phylogenetic tree indicated that neither the Asian short-toed lark, nor the lesser short-toed lark as currently defined are monophyletic. Most of the subspecies were also found to be non-monophyletic. The authors refrained from proposing a revised taxonomy until additional studies had been completed comparing the vocalizations, sexual behaviour and ecology.

=== Species ===
The genus Alaudala contains the following species:

Image	Scientific name	Common name	Distribution
	Alaudala athensis	Athi short-toed lark	southern Kenya and northern Tanzania
	Alaudala cheleensis	Asian short-toed lark	south-central to eastern Asia.
	Alaudala somalica	Somali short-toed lark	eastern and northeastern Africa.
	Alaudala rufescens	Mediterranean short-toed lark	Mediterranean Basin and parts of the Middle East
	Alaudala heinei	Turkestan short-toed lark	Siberia west to Turkey and north to Ukraine
	Alaudala raytal	Sand lark	Gangetic plains
