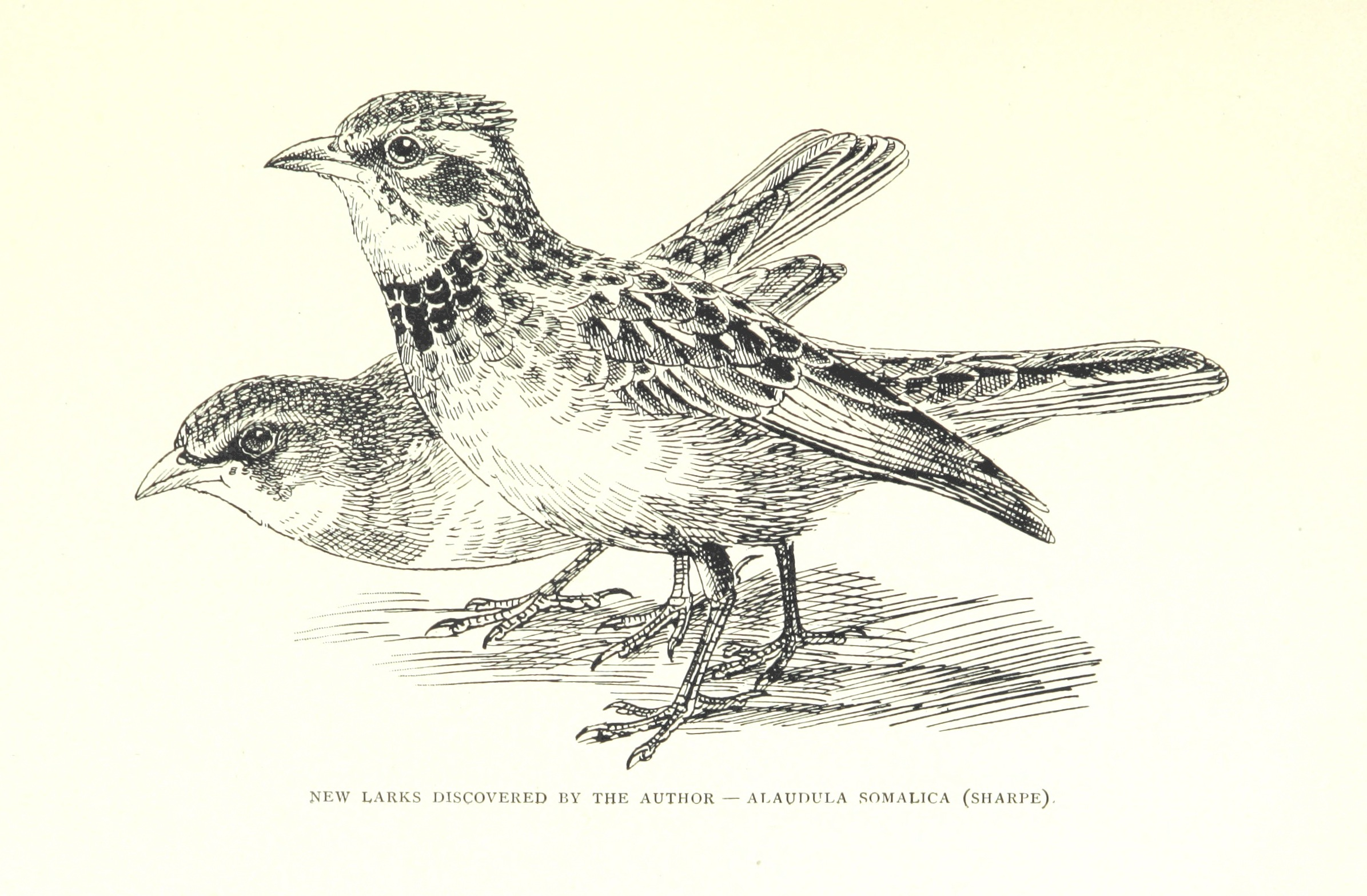
- An 1897 illustration of the Somali short-toed lark

Conservation status
- Least Concern (IUCN 3.1)

Scientific classification
- Kingdom: Animalia
- Phylum: Chordata
- Class: Aves
- Order: Passeriformes
- Family: Alaudidae
- Genus: Alaudala
- Species: A. somalica

Binomial name
- Alaudala somalica Sharpe, 1895

Synonyms
- Alaudula somalica; Calandrella rufescens somalica; Calandrella somalica

= Somali short-toed lark =

Species of bird

The Somali short-toed lark (Alaudala somalica) is a small passerine bird of the lark family found in eastern and north-eastern Africa.

The habitat of the Somali short-toed lark is subtropical or tropical dry lowland grassland.

== Taxonomy ==
The Somali short-toed lark was formally described in 1895 by the English ornithologist Richard Bowdler Sharpe based on a specimen collected on the Haud plateau of Somalia by the American explorer Arthur Donaldson Smith. Sharpe coined the binomial name Alaudala somalica. The Somali short-toed lark was formerly sometimes treated as a subspecies of the Mediterranean short-toed lark (Alaudala rufescens). The Athi short-toed lark was formerly treated as a subspecies.

Four subspecies are recognised:

- A. s. perconfusa (White, CMN, 1960) – northwest Somalia
- A. s. somalica Sharpe, 1895 – east Ethiopia and north Somalia
- A. s. megaensis (Benson, 1946) – south Ethiopia to central Kenya
- A. s. athensis Sharpe, 1900 - southern Kenya and northern Tanzania
