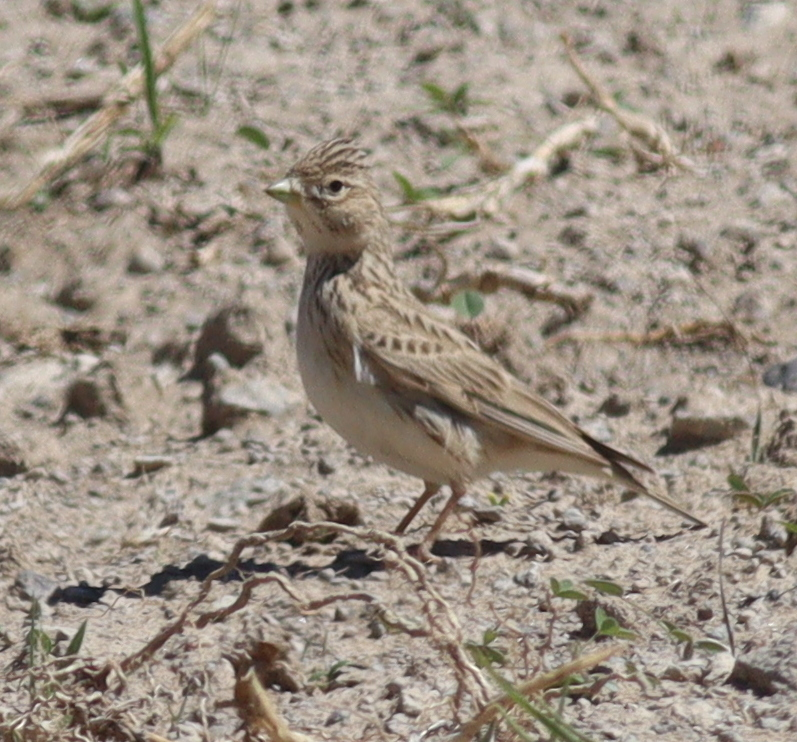
- In Muradiye, Van, Turkey

Scientific classification
- Kingdom: Animalia
- Phylum: Chordata
- Class: Aves
- Order: Passeriformes
- Family: Alaudidae
- Genus: Alaudala
- Species: A. heinei

Binomial name
- Alaudala heinei (Homeyer, 1873)

= Turkestan short-toed lark =

Species of bird

The Turkestan short-toed lark (Alaudala heinei) is a species of lark in the family Alaudidae. It is found in Ukraine and central Turkey through parts of Central Asia and southern Siberia west to south-central Mongolia and south to southern Afghanistan. This species and the Mediterranean short-toed lark (A. rufescens) were formerly considered conspecific and called the lesser short-toed lark, but a 2020 study recovered them as distinct species.

== Etymology ==
The genus name Alaudala is the diminutive of Alauda. The specific name heinei commemorates the German ornithologist Ferdinand Heine.

== Subspecies ==
Four subspecies are recognized:

- Alaudala heinei pseudobaetica - (Stegmann, 1932): Found in eastern Turkey, Transcaucasia and northern Iran
- Alaudala heinei heinei - (Homeyer, 1873): Found from Ukraine to eastern Kazakhstan
- Alaudala heinei aharonii - (Hartert, 1910): Found in central Turkey
- Alaudala heinei persica - Sharpe, 1890: Found in eastern and southern Iraq to southern and south-western Afghanistan
