= L. S. Stepanyan =

- Born: 19 March 1931; Yerevan, Armenia
- Died: 16 February 2002 (aged 70)
- Citizenship: Soviet Union
- Education: Doctor of Science (1990)
- Alma mater: Moscow State University (1955)
- Known for: Writing Conspectus of the ornithological fauna of the USSR and other avifaunas
- Scientific career
- Fields: Ornithology
- Author abbrev. (zoology): Stepanyan

Leo Surenovich Stepanyan (Лео Суренович Степанян) (19 March 1931 – 16 February 2002) was an Armenian ornithologist, best known as the author of the Conspectus of the ornithological fauna of the USSR, a taxonomic work in Russian on birds of the Soviet Union.

Leo was born in Yerevan on 19 March 1931, the son of Suren, a family physician, and Julia. In 1950 he graduated from Leo High School in Yessentuki and then moved to Lomonosov Moscow State University, where he met G. P. Dementieev and other ornithologists. After his graduation in 1955 he spent two years at the Zoological Museum of the university (Zoological Museum of the Moscow State Lomonosov University – ZMMU), where he met ornithologists from all over the USSR who came to examine the collection. From 1957 he taught zoology and under the guidance of S. P. Naumov and A. V. Mikheev, he and some students made expeditions to the Tien Shan, the Pamirs, the Urals and other regions to collect bird specimens. He published several papers on the results of these collection trips. In 1975 he was invited by the Institute of Evolutionary Morphology and Ecology of Animals and became part of the scientific team that went on the research vessel "Callisto" to the islands of the southwest Pacific. He also made expeditions to Mongolia, Vietnam (eleven expeditions from 1978 to 1990) and North Korea.

His major works included the Birds of Vietnam and the Conspectus of the ornithological fauna of the USSR (1990).

He died on 16 February 2002.
