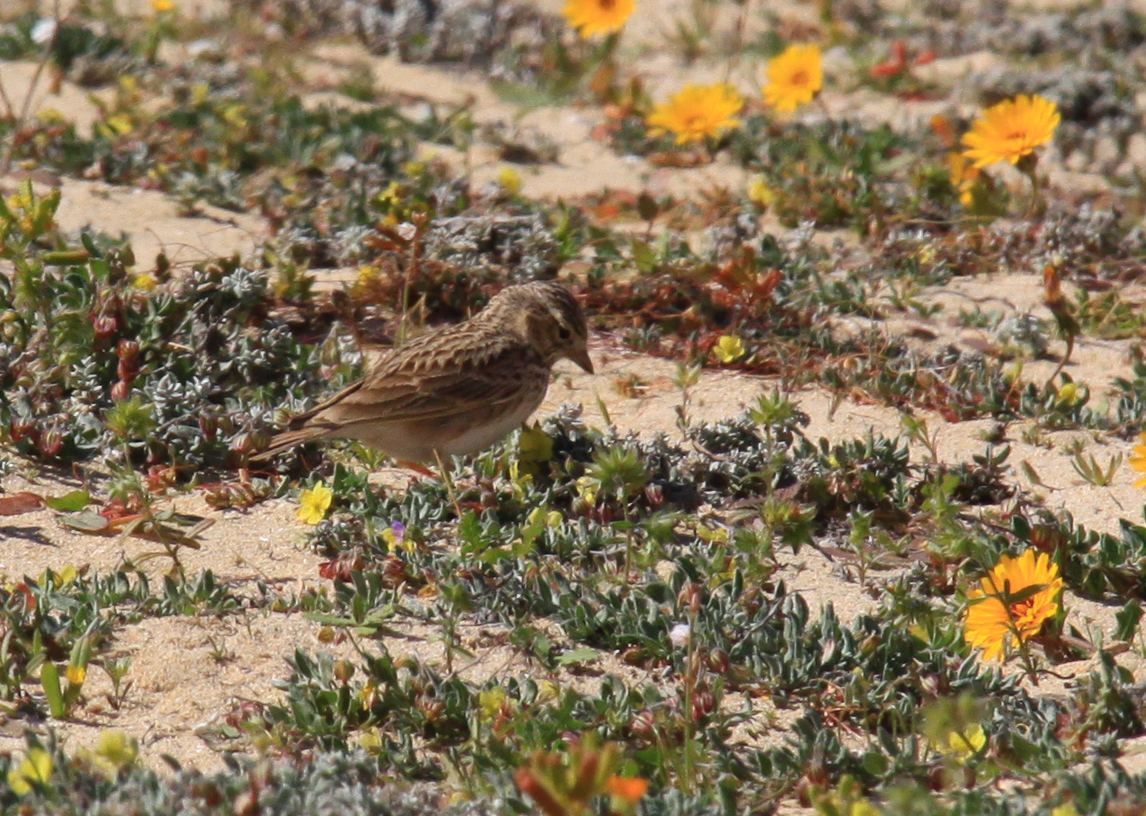
- On Fuerteventura, Canary Islands, Spain

Conservation status
- Least Concern (IUCN 3.1)

Scientific classification
- Kingdom: Animalia
- Phylum: Chordata
- Class: Aves
- Order: Passeriformes
- Family: Alaudidae
- Genus: Alaudala
- Species: A. rufescens

Binomial name
- Alaudala rufescens (Vieillot, 1819)
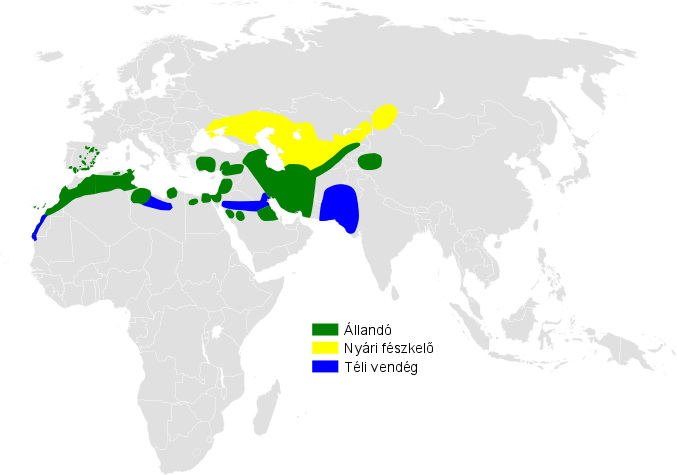
- Range includes that of A. heinei

Synonyms
- Alauda rufescens; Calandrella pispoletta; Calandrella rufescens

= Mediterranean short-toed lark =

Species of bird

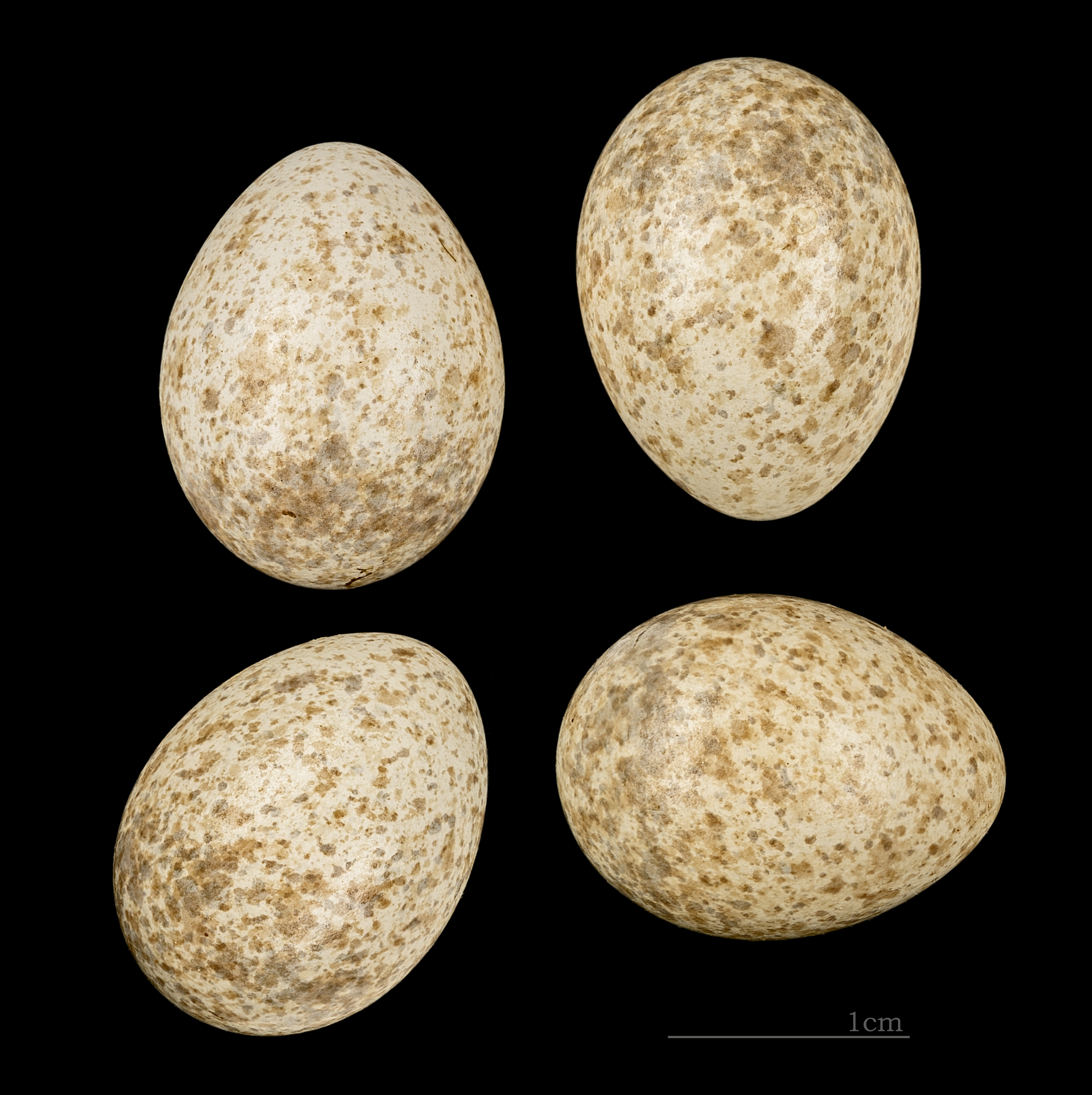
Eggs of Alaudala rufescens minor MHNT

The Mediterranean short-toed lark (Alaudala rufescens) is a small passerine bird found in and around the Mediterranean Basin. It is a common bird with a very wide range from Canary Islands north to the Iberian Peninsula and east throughout North Africa to parts of the Middle East. The International Union for Conservation of Nature has rated its conservation status as being of "least concern".

Its range was also previously thought to include parts of Central Asia, and with the Mediterranean and Central Asian clades combined the species was referred to as the lesser short-toed lark. However, a 2020 study split these two populations into distinct species, with A. rufescens being the Mediterranean clade and A. heinei being the Central Asian clade. Confusingly, Hume's short-toed lark is also sometimes called the lesser short-toed lark.

== Taxonomy and systematics ==
The Mediterranean short-toed lark was originally described as belonging to the genus Alauda. The genus name Alaudala is a diminutive of Alauda, and the specific rufescens is Latin for "reddish", from rufus "red". Alternate names for the lesser short-toed lark include the common short-toed lark, grey lark, rufous short-toed lark and short-toed lark. Formerly or presently, some authorities considered the Athi short-toed lark, Asian short-toed lark and/or the Somali short-toed lark to be subspecies of the lesser short-toed lark.

A molecular phylogenetic study published in 2020 compared the nuclear and mitochondrial DNA from the sand, Asian short-toed, and Mediterranean short-toed larks. The study analysed samples from 130 individuals that represented 16 of the 18 recognised subspecies. The resulting phylogenetic tree indicated that neither the Asian short-toed lark, nor the Mediterranean short-toed lark as currently defined are monophyletic. Most of the subspecies were also found to be non-monophyletic. The authors refrained from proposing a revised taxonomy until additional studies had been completed comparing the vocalizations, sexual behaviour and ecology.

Another 2020 study found that the Mediterranean and the Central & West Asian populations of A. rufescens represented two different species, the Mediterranean short-toed lark (A. rufescens) and the Turkestan short-toed lark (A. heinei). A. heinei was lifted to species status by some authorities such as the International Ornithological Congress, and 4 other subspecies originally assigned to rufescens were assigned to it instead.

=== Subspecies ===
Five subspecies are recognized:

- A. r. rufescens - (Vieillot, 1819): Found on Tenerife (west-central Canary Islands)
- A. r. polatzeki - (Hartert, 1904): Found in eastern Canary Islands
- A. r. apetzii - (Brehm, AE, 1857): Found in eastern and southern Iberian Peninsula
- A. r. minor - (Cabanis, 1851): Found from Morocco to north-western Egypt and southern Turkey to the Sinai Peninsula and eastern Iraq
- A. r. nicolli - (Hartert, 1909): Found in the Nile Delta (northern Egypt)

4 other subspecies (A. r. heinei, A. r. pseudobaetica, A. r. aharonii, A. r. persica) were transferred to A. heinei when that species was split.

== Description ==
The Mediterranean short-toed lark is similar in size and appearance to the greater short-toed lark but is generally a duller-looking bird with a more streaked breast. It grows to a length of from 13 to 14 cm (5.1 to 5.5 in) and the sexes are similar. As with the greater short-toed lark, the colour varies across the broad range and is not a good distinguishing feature. It is dark-streaked greyish-brown above, and white below. It has a pale supercilium, and a short stubby bill.

Care must be taken to distinguish this species from the Calandrella larks. This species lacks the dark neck patches of the greater, and has fine streaking across the breast. The bill and head shape also differ, this species having a shorter, less-conical bill and a more-rounded, smaller head. The song is richer, more varied and imitative than that of its relative.

== Distribution and habitat ==
The Mediterranean short-toed lark breeds in Spain, north Africa, also including Turkey eastwards across the semi-deserts of central Asia to Mongolia and China. Many populations, including the Spanish and African breeders, are sedentary (non-migratory), but some Asian birds from the north of the breeding range migrate south in winter. This species is a very rare wanderer to northern and western Europe.

== Behaviour and ecology ==
This is a bird of dry open country, preferring even drier and barer soils than the greater short-toed lark. It nests on the ground, laying two or three eggs. Its food is seeds and insects, the latter especially in the breeding season.
