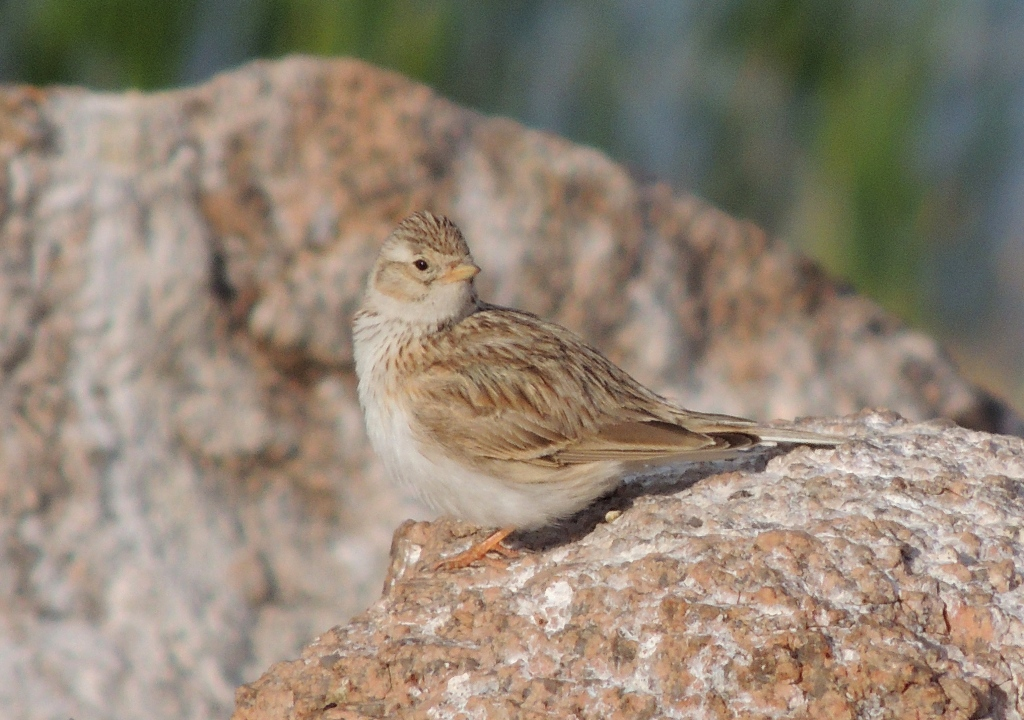

Scientific classification
- Domain: Eukaryota
- Kingdom: Animalia
- Phylum: Chordata
- Class: Aves
- Order: Passeriformes
- Family: Alaudidae
- Genus: Alaudala
- Species: A. cheleensis

Binomial name
- Alaudala cheleensis R. Swinhoe, 1871
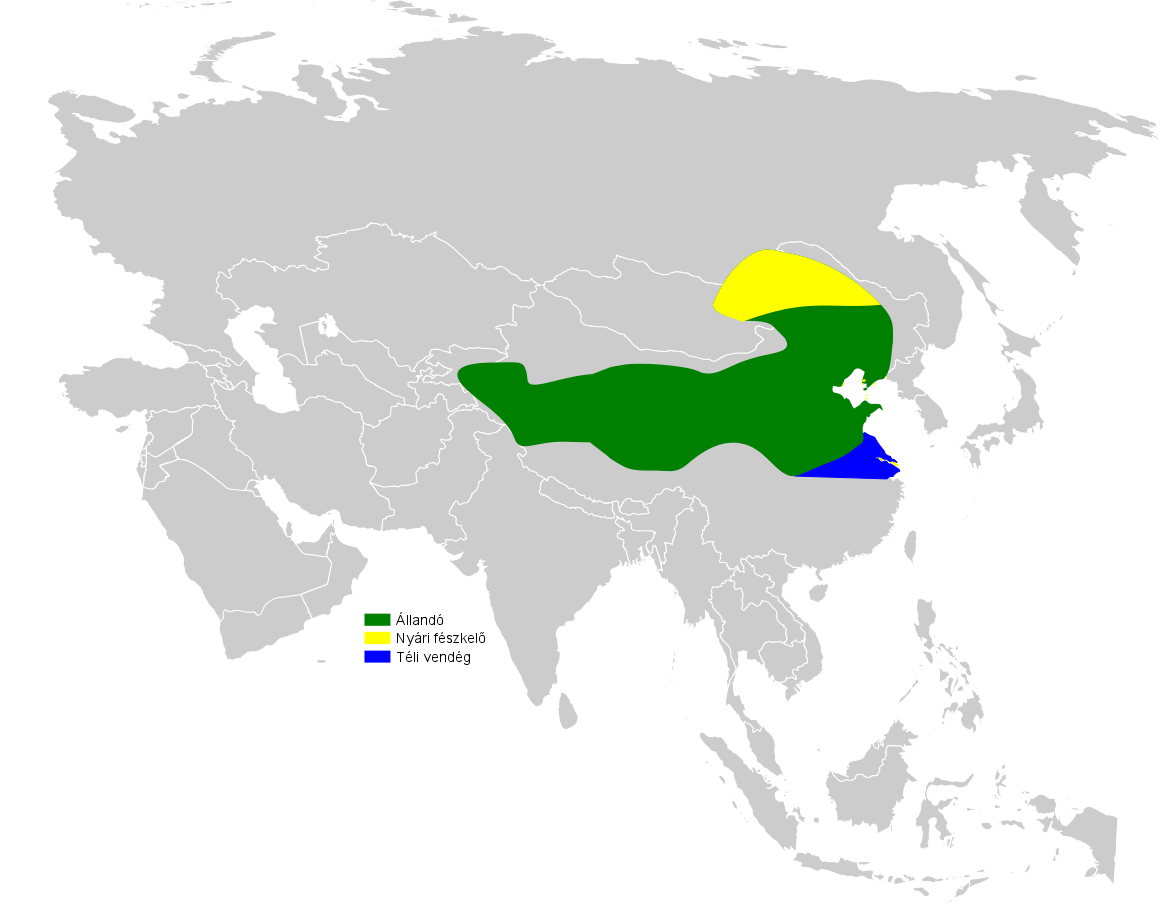

Synonyms
- Alaudula cheleënsis; Calandrella cheelensis; Calandrella cheleensis; Calandrella rufescens cheleensis

= Asian short-toed lark =

Species of bird

The Asian short-toed lark (Alaudala cheleensis) is a lark in the family Alaudidae. The species was first described by Robert Swinhoe in 1871. It is found from south-central to eastern Asia.

== Taxonomy and systematics ==
Formerly or presently, some authorities have considered the Asian short-toed lark to belong to the genus Calandrella or to be a subspecies of the lesser short-toed lark. Alternate names for the Asian short-toed lark include the Asiatic short-toed lark, eastern short-toed lark (a name also used by the steppe greater short-toed lark), grey short-toed lark, Mongolian short-toed lark (not to be confused with the species of the same name, Calandrella dukhunensis), salined lark and salt-marsh lark.

A molecular phylogenetic study published in 2020 compared the nuclear and mitochondrial DNA from the sand, Asian short-toed, and Mediterranean short-toed larks. The study analysed samples from 130 individuals that represented 16 of the 18 recognised subspecies. The resulting phylogenetic tree indicated that neither the Asian short-toed lark, nor the lesser short-toed lark as currently defined are monophyletic. Most of the subspecies were also found to be non-monophyletic. The authors refrained from proposing a revised taxonomy until additional studies had been completed comparing the vocalizations, sexual behaviour and ecology.

=== Subspecies ===
Six subspecies are recognized:

- A. c. leucophaea - (Severtsov, 1873): Originally described as a separate species in the genus Calandrella. Found from Kazakhstan to Turkmenistan
- A. c. seebohmi - Sharpe, 1890: Originally described as a separate species. Found in north-western China
- A. c. tuvinica - (Stepanyan, 1975): Found in north-western Mongolia and southern Russia
- A. c. cheleensis - R. Swinhoe, 1871: Found in south-central Siberia, north-eastern Mongolia and north-eastern China
- A. c. kukunoorensis - Przewalski, 1876: Found in west-central China
- A. c. beicki - (Meise, 1933): Found in southern Mongolia and north-central China
