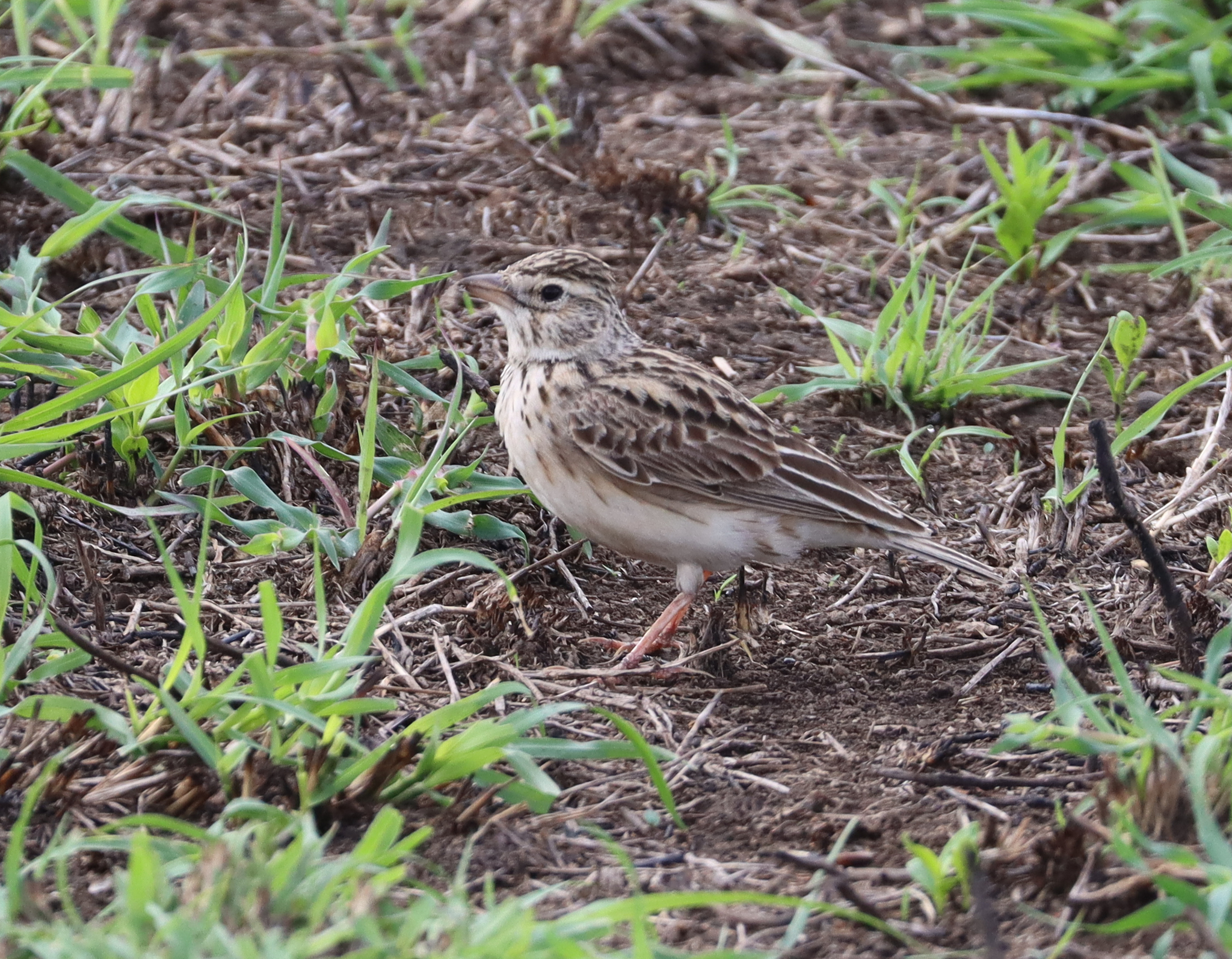

Scientific classification
- Kingdom: Animalia
- Phylum: Chordata
- Class: Aves
- Order: Passeriformes
- Family: Alaudidae
- Genus: Alaudala
- Species: A. somalica
- Subspecies: A. s. athensis

Trinomial name
- Alaudala somalica athensis (Sharpe, 1900)

Synonyms
- Alaudala athensis; Calandrella athensis; Calandrella rufescens athensis; Calandrella somalica athensis; Spizocorys athensis

= Athi short-toed lark =

Species of bird

The Athi short-toed lark (Alaudala athensis) is a subspecies of lark in the family Alaudidae. It is found in southern Kenya and northern Tanzania. It is considered a subspecies of the Somali short-toed lark.

== Taxonomy and systematics ==
The Athi short-toed lark was originally described as belonging to the genus Spizocorys and was then classified as belonging to the genus Calandrella until moved to Alaudala in 2014. Authorities consider the Athi short-toed lark as a subspecies of the Somali short-toed lark. Alternate names for the Athi short-toed lark include the Athi lark and Kenya short-toed lark (a name also used for the Damara pink-billed lark).
