= Lesser short-toed lark =

The lesser short-toed lark has been split into two species:

- Mediterranean short-toed lark, Alaudala rufescens
- Turkestan short-toed lark, Alaudala heinei
