= Leisler =

Leisler may refer to:

== People ==
- Jacob Leisler (c. 1640–1691) was a German-born colonist of New York
- Johann Philipp Achilles Leisler (c. 1771–1813), German physician and naturalist

== Animals ==
- Leisler's bat (Nyctalus leisleri)

== See also ==
- Leisler's Rebellion
