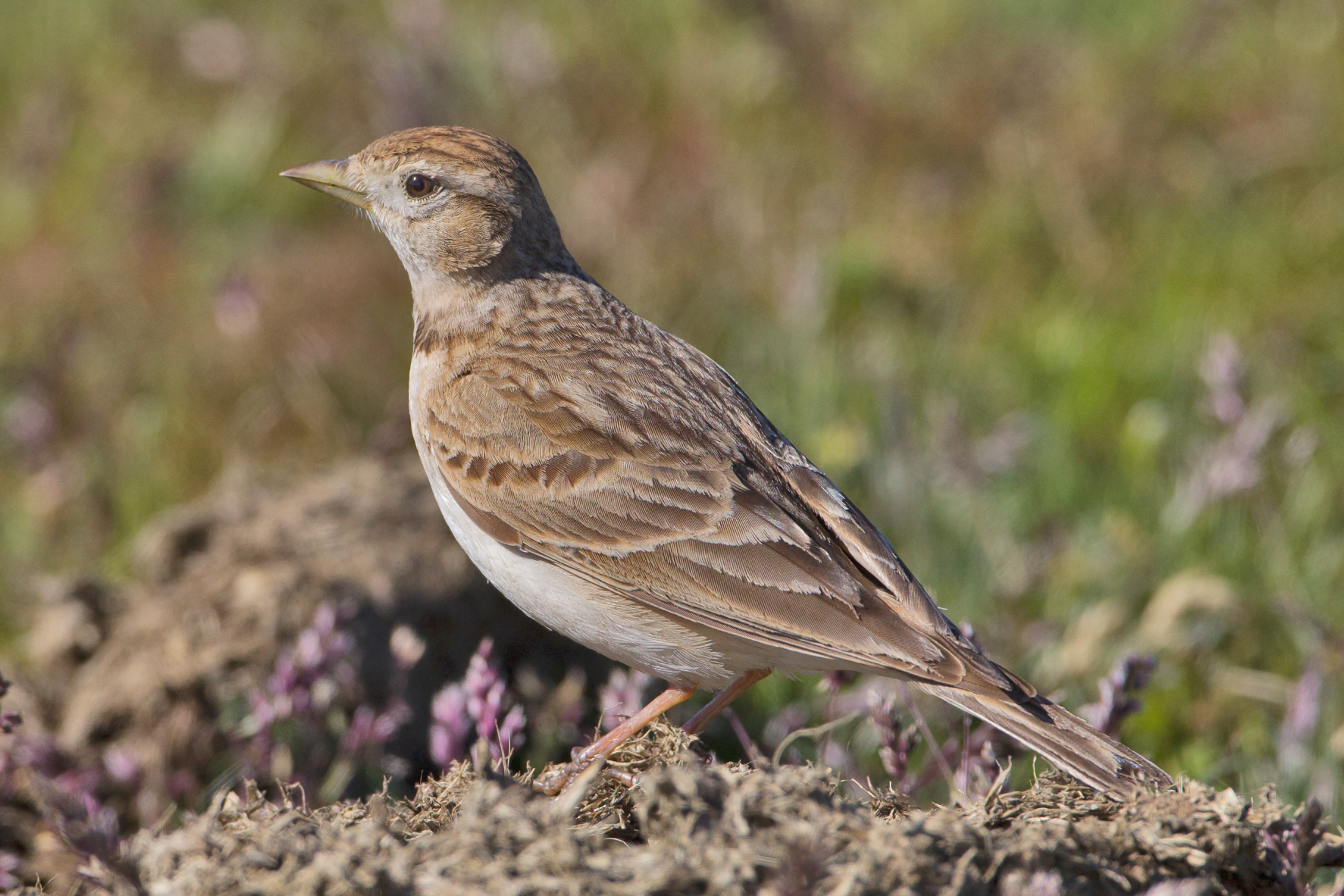
- C. b. brachydactyla in Spain

Conservation status
- Least Concern (IUCN 3.1)

Scientific classification
- Kingdom: Animalia
- Phylum: Chordata
- Class: Aves
- Order: Passeriformes
- Family: Alaudidae
- Genus: Calandrella
- Species: C. brachydactyla

Binomial name
- Calandrella brachydactyla (Leisler, 1814)

Subspecies
- See text
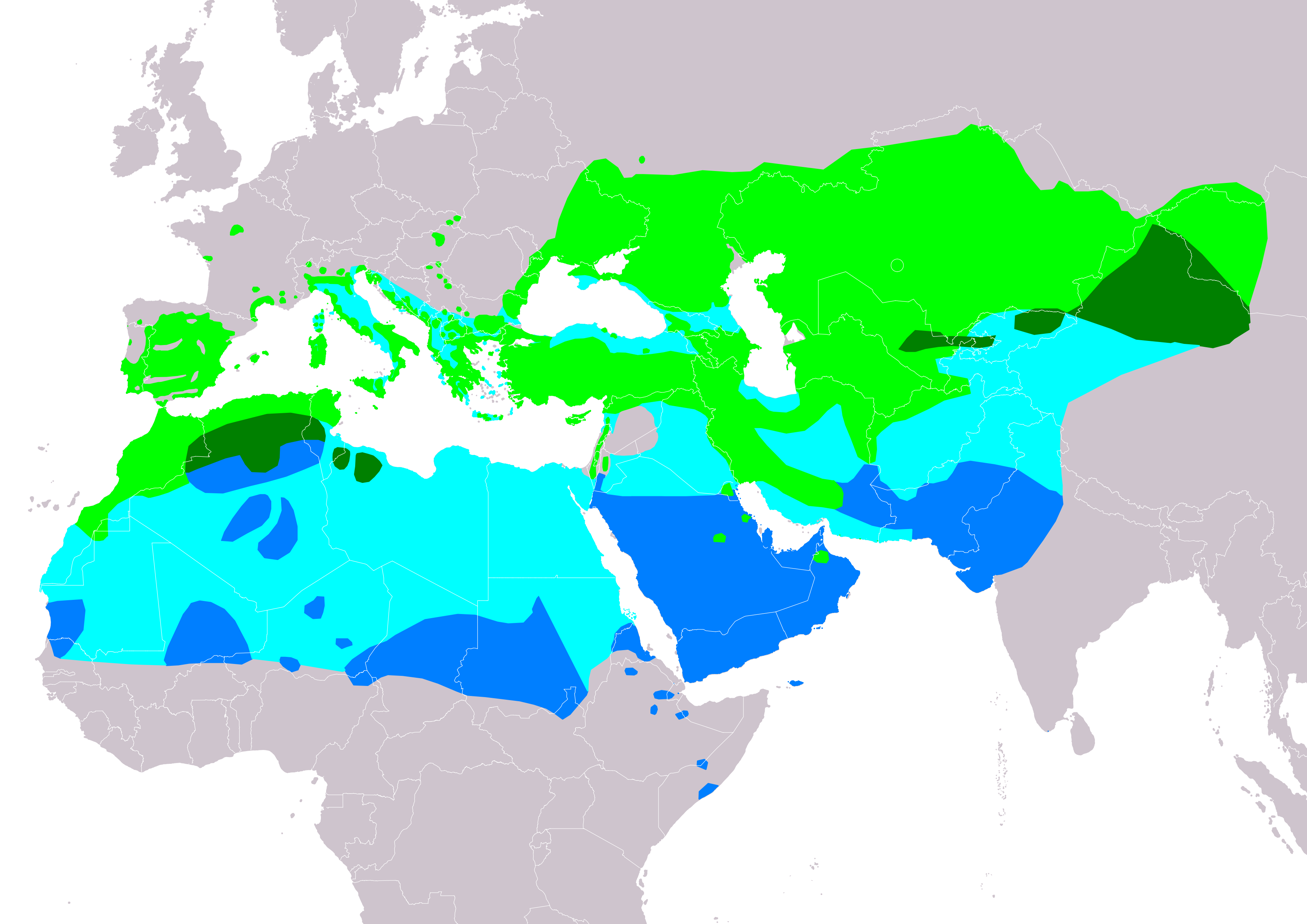
- Range of C. brachydactyla Breeding Resident Passage Non-breeding

Synonyms
- Alauda brachydactila; Calandrella brachydactila

= Greater short-toed lark =

Species of bird

The greater short-toed lark (Calandrella brachydactyla) is a small passerine bird. The current scientific name is from Ancient Greek. The genus name, Calandrella, is a diminutive of kalandros, the calandra lark, and brachydactila is from brakhus, "short", and daktulos, "toe".

It breeds in southern Europe, north-west Africa, and across the Palearctic from Turkey and southern Russia to Mongolia. During migration they form large, tight flocks that move in unison; at other times they form loose flocks.

== Taxonomy and systematics ==
The greater short-toed lark was described by the German naturalist Johann Leisler in 1814 and given the binomial name Alauda brachydactila. This lark is now placed in the genus Calandrella that was established by another German naturalist, Johann Jakob Kaup, in 1829. The specific name brachydactyla is from the Ancient Greek βραχυδακτυλος brakhudaktulos "short-toed" from brakhus "short" and daktulos "toe". The alternate name short-toed lark may also be used for three other species in the genus Calandrella. The Mongolian short-toed lark was formerly considered as a subspecies of the greater short-toed lark (as C. b. dukhunensis) until split in 2016 by the IOC. Formerly, some authorities also considered the red-capped lark to be either conspecific (as C. cinerea) with or a subspecies (as C. b. cinerea) of the greater short-toed lark.

=== Subspecies ===
Eight subspecies are recognized:

- European greater short-toed lark (C. b. brachydactyla) or Palestine short-toed lark - (Leisler, 1814): Found in southern Europe, on Mediterranean islands and in north-western Africa.
- Hungarian greater short-toed lark (C. b. hungarica) - Horváth, 1956: Found in Hungary and northern Serbia
- North African greater short-toed lark (C. b. rubiginosa) - Fromholz, 1913: Found in northern Africa
- Levant greater short-toed lark (C. b. hermonensis) - Tristram, 1865: Originally described as a separate species. Found from southern Turkey and Syria to north-eastern Egypt.

The syntypes of Calandrella hermonensis Tristram (Proc. Zool. Soc. London, 1864, p.434), 3 adult males and a juvenile, are held in the vertebrate zoology collection of National Museums Liverpool at World Museum, with accession numbers NML-VZ T15738, NML-VZ T17770, NML-VZ T17771 and NML-VZ T17773. The specimens were collected at the foot of Mount Hermon, Lebanon in June 1864 by Canon Henry Baker Tristram. The specimens came to the Liverpool national collection through the purchase of Tristram's collection by the museum in 1896.

- BIrelandcik greater short-toed lark (C. b. woltersi) - Kumerloeve, 1969: Found in southern Turkey and north-western Syria
- Transcaucasian greater short-toed lark (C. b. artemisiana) - Banjkovski, 1913: Found from central Turkey and Transcaucasia to north-western Iran
- Steppe greater short-toed lark (C. b. longipennis) - (Eversmann, 1848): Originally described as a separate species in the genus Alauda. Also known as Eastern short-toed lark (a name also used by the Asian short-toed lark) or Yarkand short-toed lark. Found from Ukraine and southern Russia to south-central Siberia and southern Mongolia
- C. b. orientalis - Sushkin, 1925: Found in central Siberia, northern Mongolia and northern China

== Description ==
Several subspecies have been named but there is considerable geneflow and the species itself forms part of a larger complex. This is a small pale lark, smaller than the skylark. It is dark-streaked greyish-brown above, and white below, and has a strong pointed bill that is pinkish with a grey culmen. It has a pale supercilium, dark patches on each side of its neck and a dark tail. Some birds in the west of the range have a rufous crown. The sexes are similar. The greater short-toed lark is paler than the Mongolian short-toed lark which also has a shorter bill. In winter they fly in large and compact flocks that swing in synchrony. Care must be taken to distinguish this species from other similar larks, such as the Mediterranean short-toed lark.

The nominate form breeds in Europe (Iberia, France, Italy, the Balkans and Romania) and winters in Africa. Subspecies hungarica breeds in the eastern parts of Europe while rubiginosa breeds in north-western Africa. Subspecies hermonensis (sometimes including woltersi) breeds in Turkey, Syria and Egypt. Subspecies artemisiana (considered by some to be synonymous with longipennis) breeds in Asia Minor and winters in southern west Asia. Subspecies longipennis breeds in Ukraine, Mongolia and Manchuria and winters in South Asia mainly in the drier zone of north-western India.

The song varies between a dry twittering and a more varied and imitative melody. Flocks will often fly together to water in the mornings at favourite spots. In the evenings they roost in open ground, with each bird squatting in a small depression made in the soil.

== Distribution and habitat ==
All but some southernmost populations are migratory, wintering south to the southern edge of the Sahara and India. This species is a fairly common wanderer to northern and western Europe in spring and autumn. Populations breeding in the Iberian Peninsula winter south of the Sahara in Africa. Here they prefer crop land and dry pastures with short shrubs while the syntopic Mediterranean short-toed larks (Calandrella rufescens) prefer drier areas.

This is a common bird of dry open country and cultivation. It nests on the ground, laying two to three eggs. Its food is seeds and insects, the latter especially in the breeding season.

In colonial India, they were hunted for food as ortolans.

They visit parts of South Asia in large flocks during winter and are sometimes attracted to short grass areas along aerodromes and become a bird strike risk to aircraft.

== Status ==
This species is classified as Least Concern due to its extensive range and large population size. Although the population trend appears to be decreasing, the rate of decline is not considered sufficiently rapid to warrant a threatened status.

The breeding population in Europe is estimated to number 9,460,000-18,100,000 mature individuals.

== Gallery ==
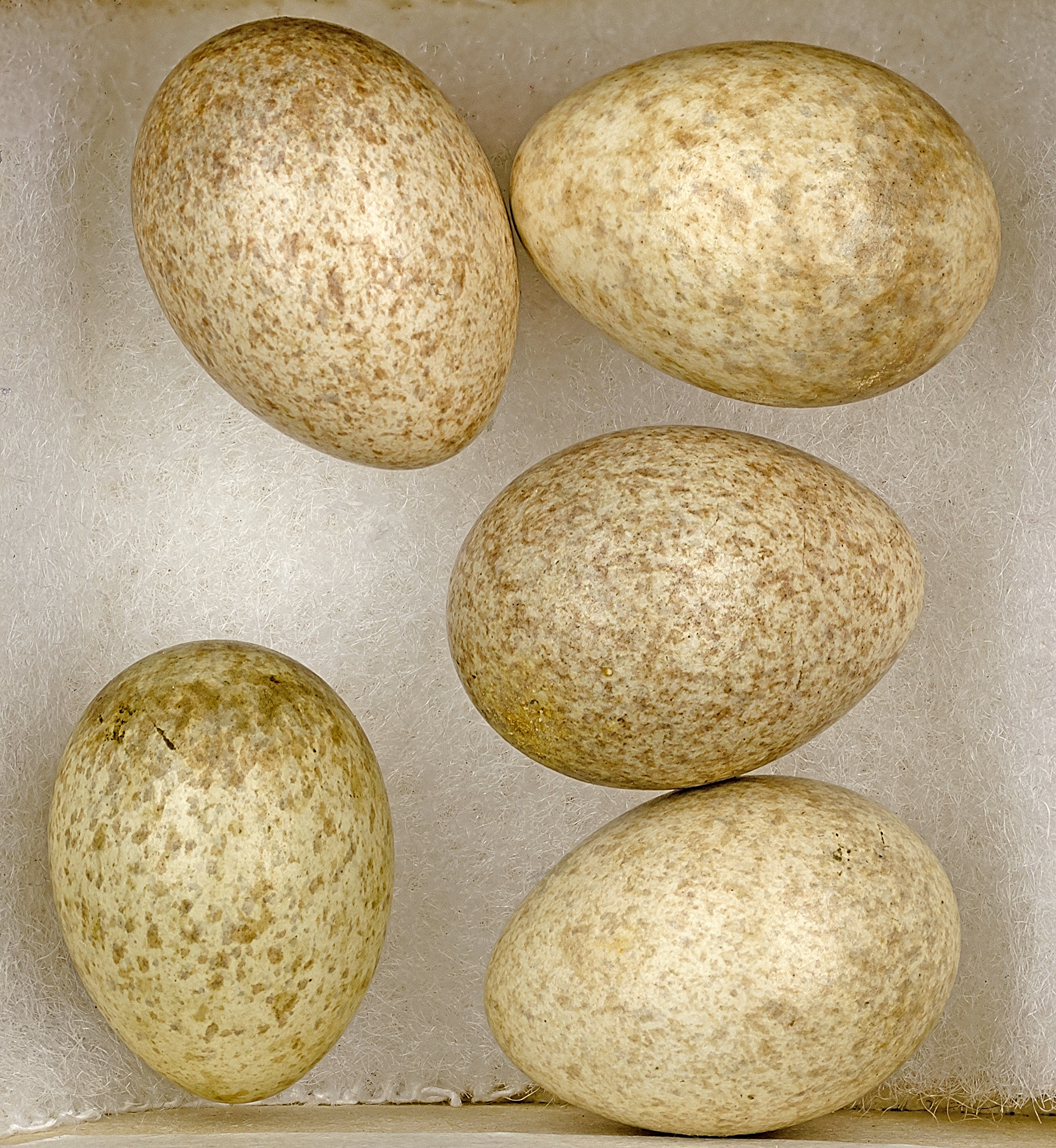
Eggs of Calandrella brachydactyla - MHNT

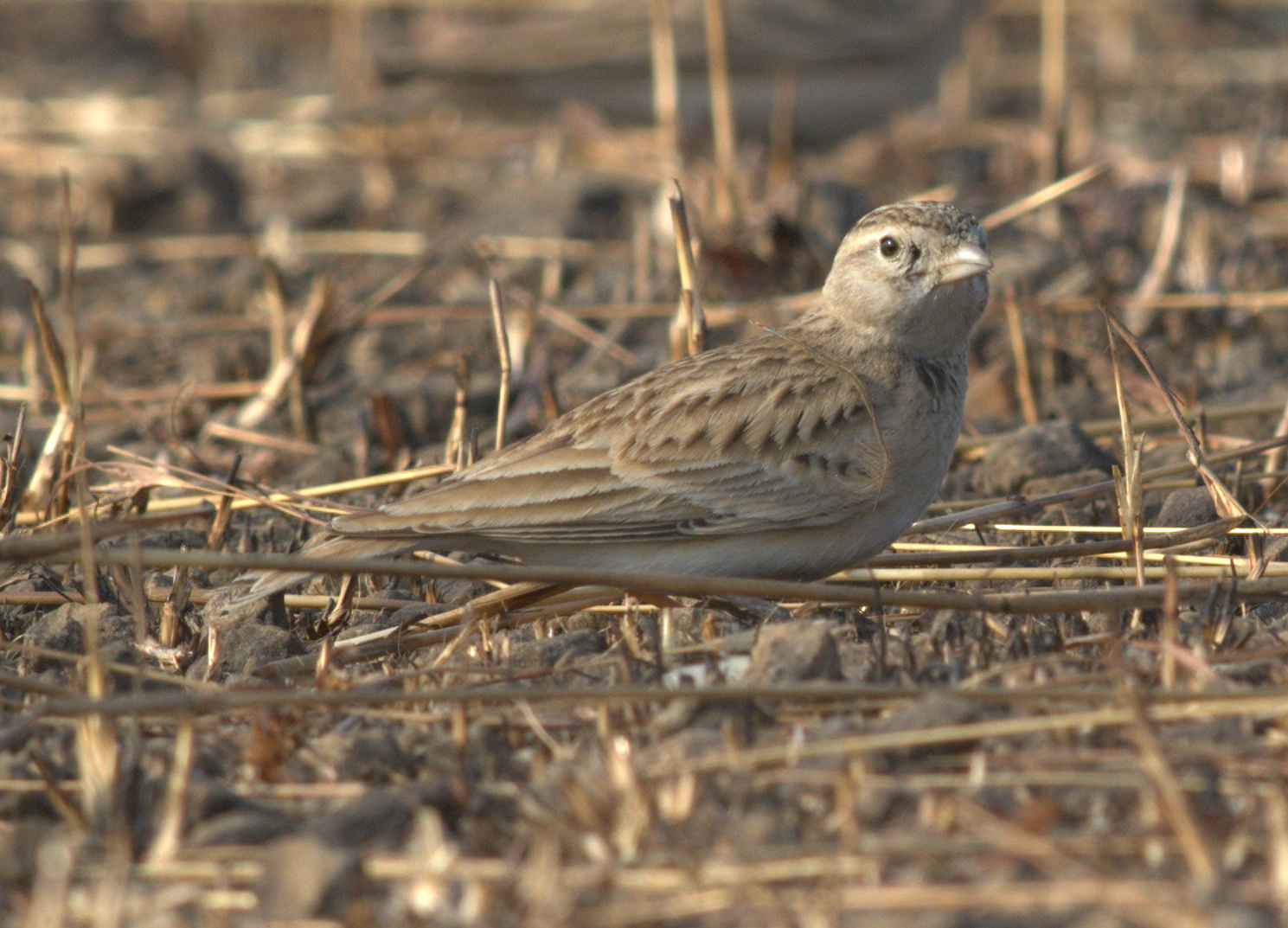
Greater short-toed lark

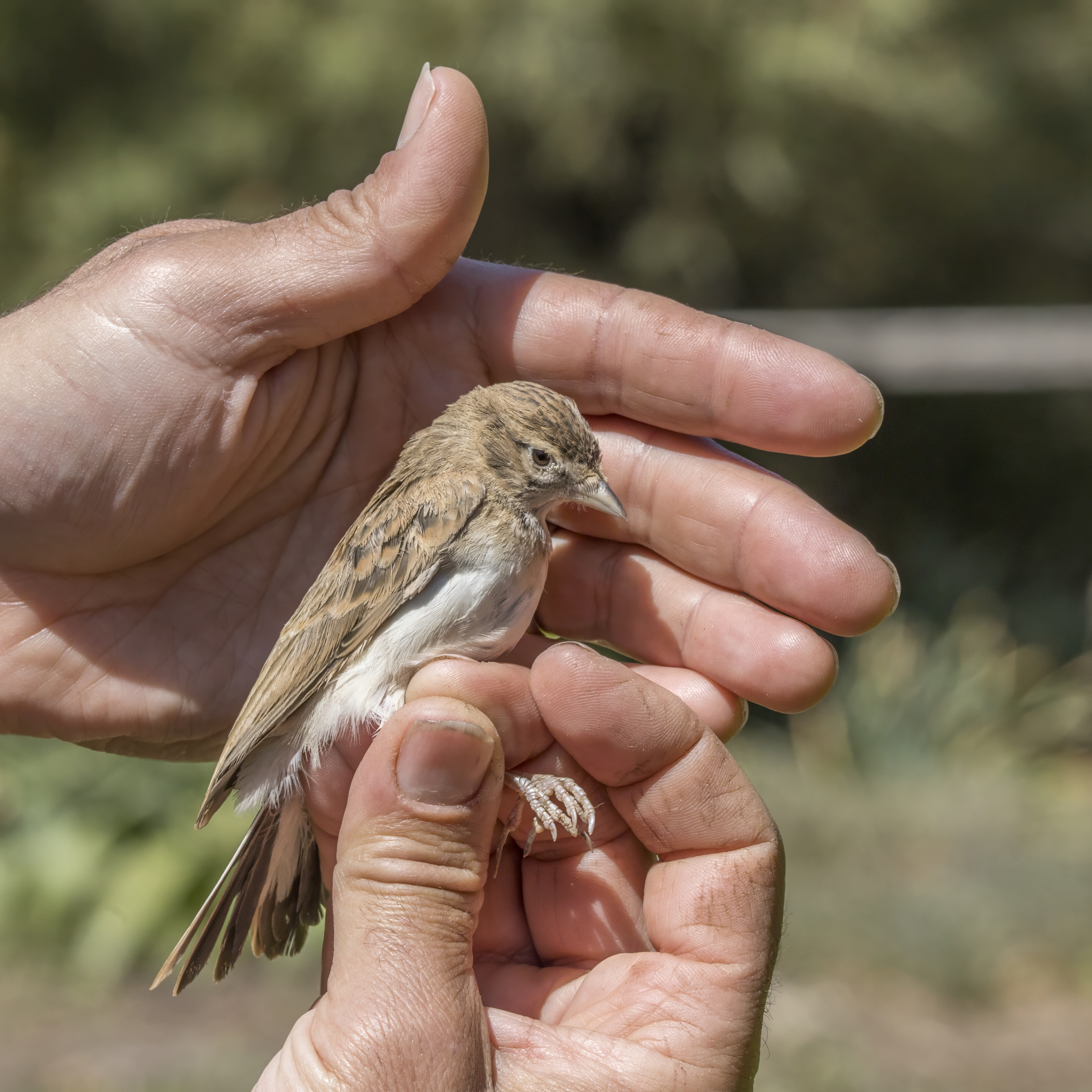
after rescue by BirdLife Malta
