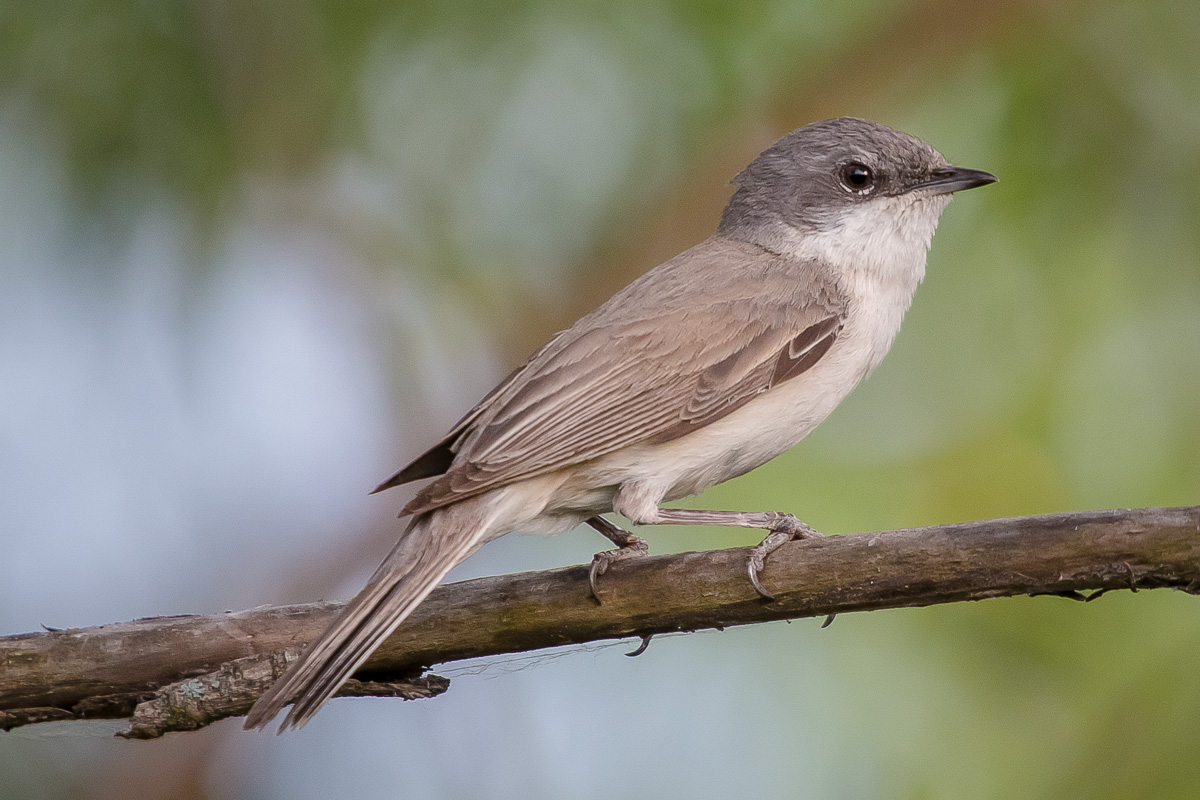
- Nominate C. c. curruca in Voronezh, Russia

Conservation status
- Least Concern (IUCN 3.1)

Scientific classification
- Kingdom: Animalia
- Phylum: Chordata
- Class: Aves
- Order: Passeriformes
- Family: Sylviidae
- Genus: Curruca
- Species: C. curruca

Binomial name
- Curruca curruca (Linnaeus, 1758)
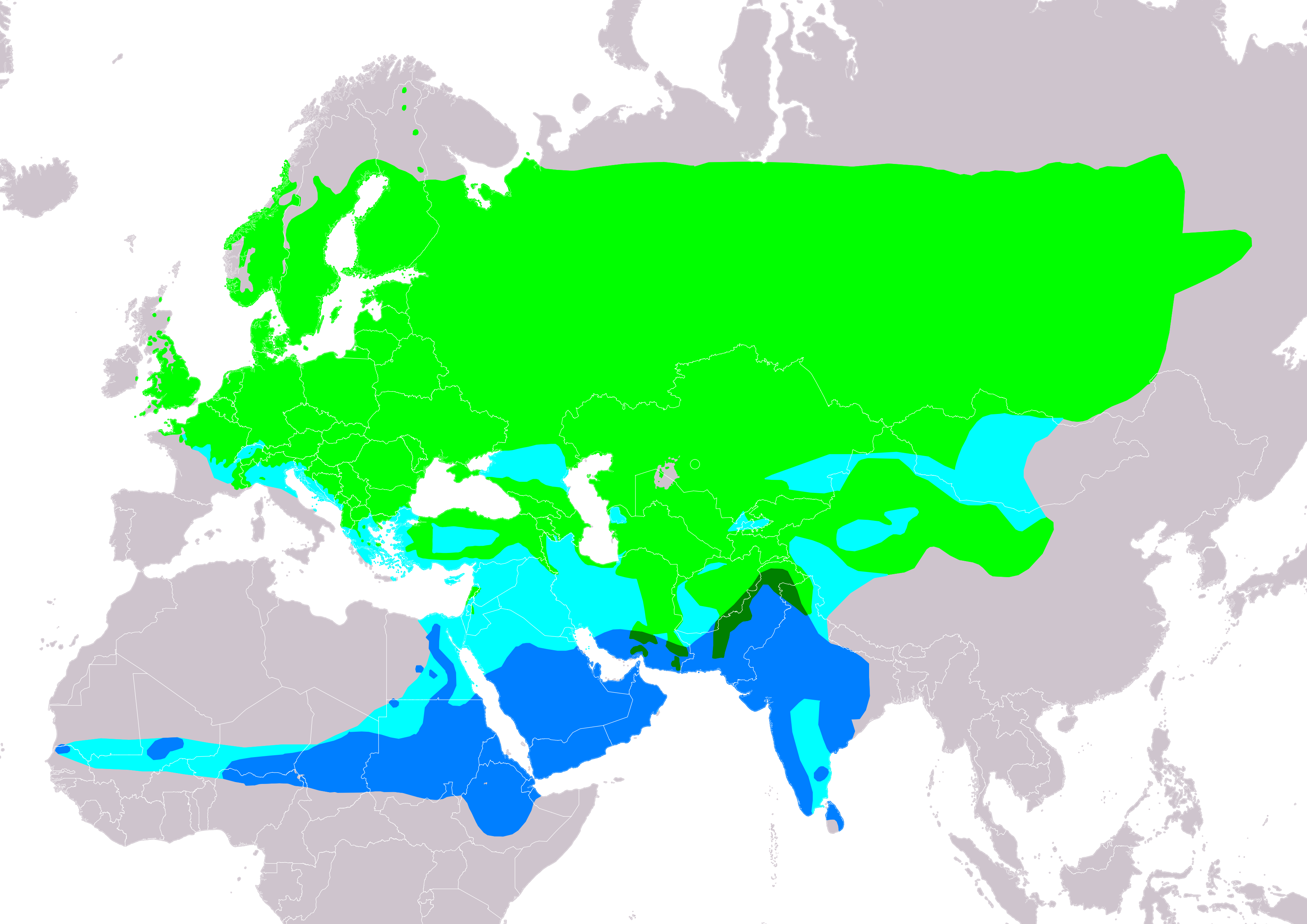
- Range of C. curruca (Compiled by: BirdLife International and Handbook of the Birds of the World (2019) 2018.) Breeding Resident Passage Non-breeding

Synonyms
- Motacilla curruca L, 1758; Sylvia curruca (L, 1758); Curruca althaea (Hume, 1878); Curruca minula Hume, 1873

= Lesser whitethroat =

Species of bird

The lesser whitethroat (Curruca curruca) is a common and widespread Old World warbler which breeds in temperate Europe, except the southwest, and in the western and central Palearctic. This small passerine bird is strongly migratory, wintering in Africa just south of the Sahara, Arabia and India.

Unlike many sylviid warblers, the sexes are almost identical. This is a small species with a grey back, whitish underparts, a grey head with a darker "bandit mask" through the eyes and a white throat. It is slightly smaller than the common whitethroat, and lacks the chestnut wings and uniform head-face colour of that species. The lesser whitethroat's song is a fast and rattling sequence of tet or che calls, quite different from the common whitethroat's scolding song.

Like most "warblers", it is insectivorous, but will also take berries and other soft fruit. This is a bird of fairly open country and cultivation, with large bushes for nesting and some trees. The nest is built in low shrub or brambles, and 3 to 7 eggs are laid.

== Taxonomy ==
The lesser whitethroat was formally described by the Swedish naturalist Carl Linnaeus in 1758 in the tenth edition of his Systema Naturae under the binomial name Motacilla curruca. The specific curruca is the Latin word for an unidentified bird mentioned by the Roman poet Juvenal. The word had been used for the lesser whitethroat by the Swiss naturalist Conrad Gessner in 1555. Linnaeus specified the locality as Europe but this was restricted to Sweden by Ernst Hartert in 1909. This species is now placed in the genus Curruca that was introduced by the German naturalist Johann Matthäus Bechstein in 1802.

This species has been commonly assumed to be closely related to the common whitethroat, as their common names imply. It was suggested that the two species separated in the last ice age similar to the pattern found in the chiffchaff and willow warbler, with their ancestor being forced into two enclaves, one in the southeast and one in the southwest of Europe. When the ice sheets retreated, the two forms supposedly no longer recognised each other as the same species. However, scientists researching this question have for quite some time realised that these two taxa are not particularly close relatives.

Rather, the lesser whitethroat and its closest relatives Hume's whitethroat and the small whitethroat appear more related to a group of morphologically quite dissimilar species. These vary much in size and colour pattern, but also lack chestnut wing patches and have a strong contrast between the usually dark head sides and the white or whitish throat. The latter group occurs from the southern parts of the lesser whitethroat complex' range into Africa and include the Orphean warbler group, the Arabian warbler, and the brown and Yemen warblers sometimes placed in Parisoma. Thus, it rather appears as if the divergence of the lesser whitethroat complex and its closest living relatives is more ancient than assumed, and that it did not involve separation by ice sheets building up in Europe, but by aridification of the Arabian region (which also occurred throughout the Ice Ages).

The lesser whitethroat complex has been split up into the present species, Hume's whitethroat, and the small whitethroat from which the Margelanic whitethroat may also be specifically distinct. In this superspecies, the lesser whitethroat seems to form the basal European lineage. Six subspecies are nowadays unequivocally accepted for the lesser whitethroat, and they intergrade throughout Central Europe and Asia:

- Curruca curruca curruca – Western lesser whitethroat – western parts of range
- Curruca curruca blythi – Northeastern lesser whitethroat – eastern parts of range. Has somewhat paler top of head, separated from face sides by white supercilium.
- Curruca curruca halimodendri – SE Russia, Kazakhstan, Uzbekistan and Turkmenistan to NW Mongolia
- Curruca curruca althaea – Hume's whitethroat – Iran, southern Turkmenistan to northern Pakistan and central Asia
- Curruca curruca minula – Desert whitethroat – southern Kazakhstan to western China
- Curruca curruca margelanica – northern China

Two more taxa occur in the intergradation zone with the small whitethroat, stretching from the northern Caspian Sea area into Mongolia. The phylogeny of these is not well-researched, and they might eventually turn out to belong to either species or be stereotyped hybrids:

- Curruca curruca/minula halimodendri
- Curruca curruca/minula telengitica

Similarly, Curruca curruca caucasica described by Ognev and Banjkovski in 1910 is intermediate between the lesser and Hume's whitethroats.

A bird which wintered at Landsort Bird Observatory, Sweden, differed in the analyzed mtDNA sequences from all known taxa in the complex, although it most closely resembled halimodendri in the field. As mtDNA is inherited from the mother only, were this bird a hybrid this should have been recognisable.

== Gallery ==
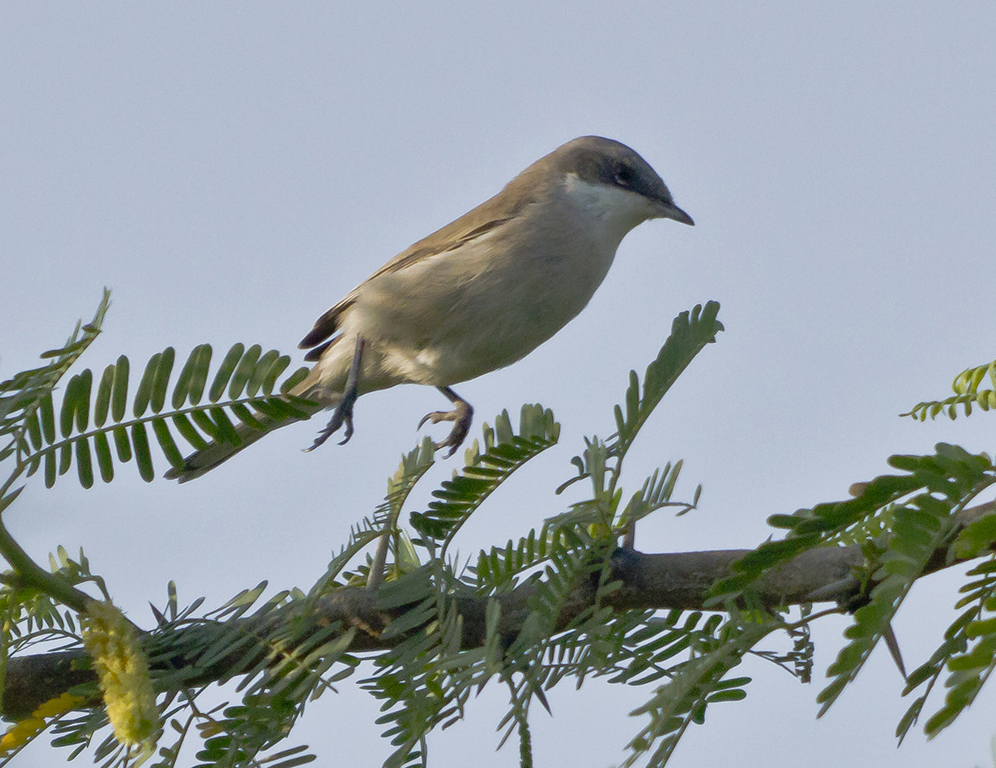
Lesser whitethroat in Rajkot, Gujarat

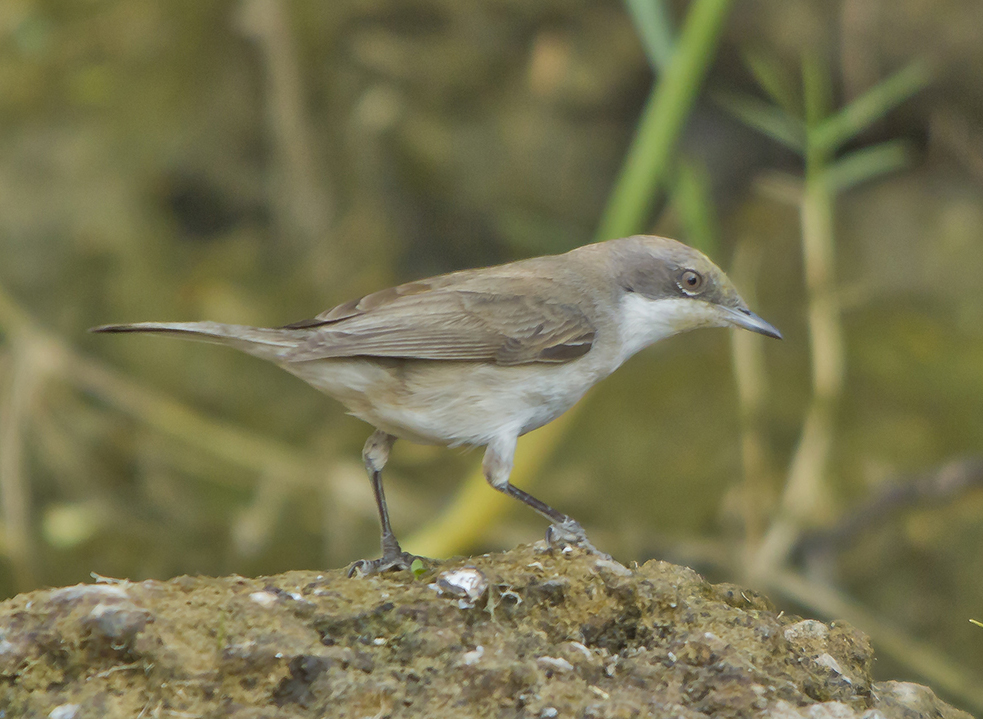
Lesser whitethroat in Rajkot

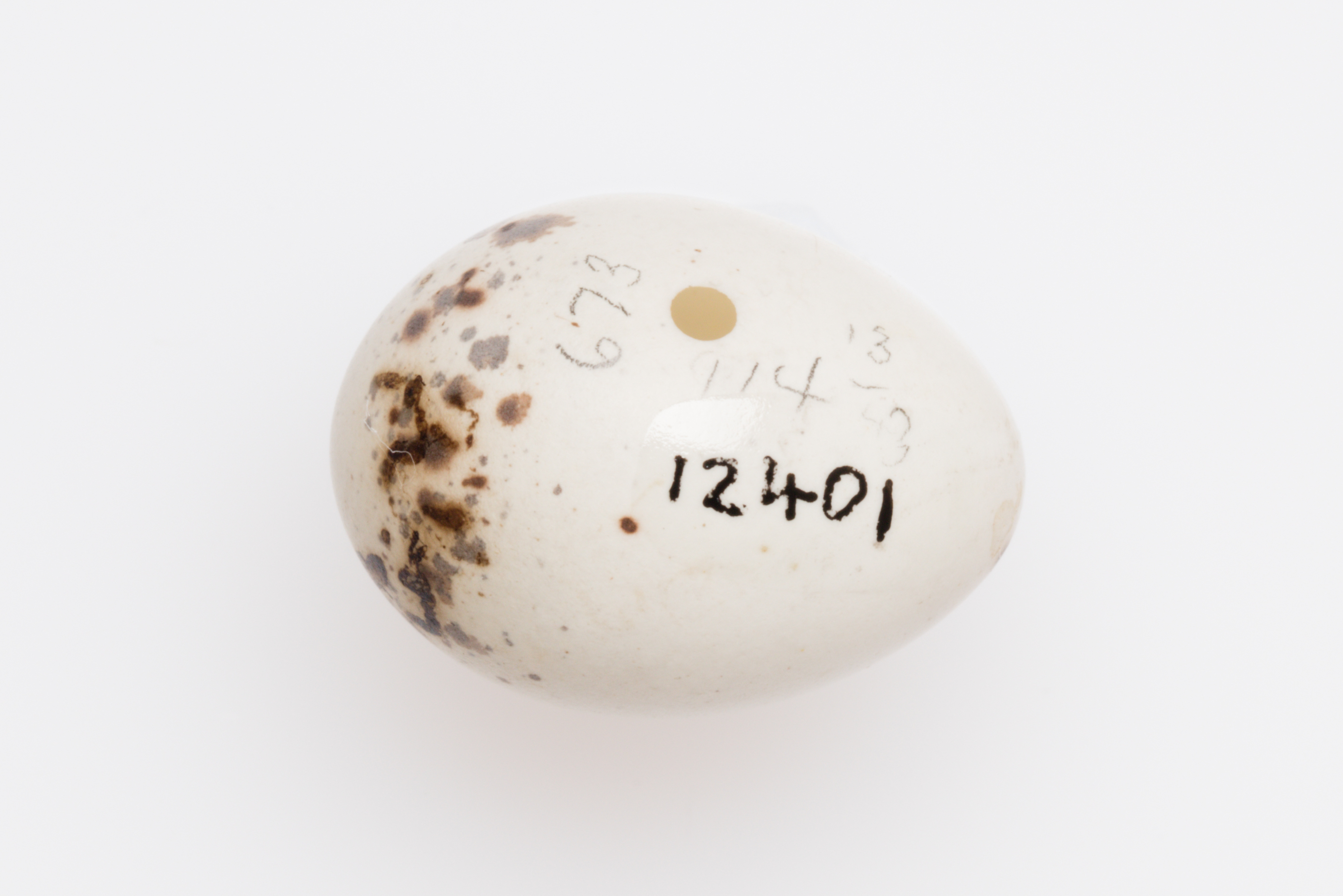
Curruca curruca egg

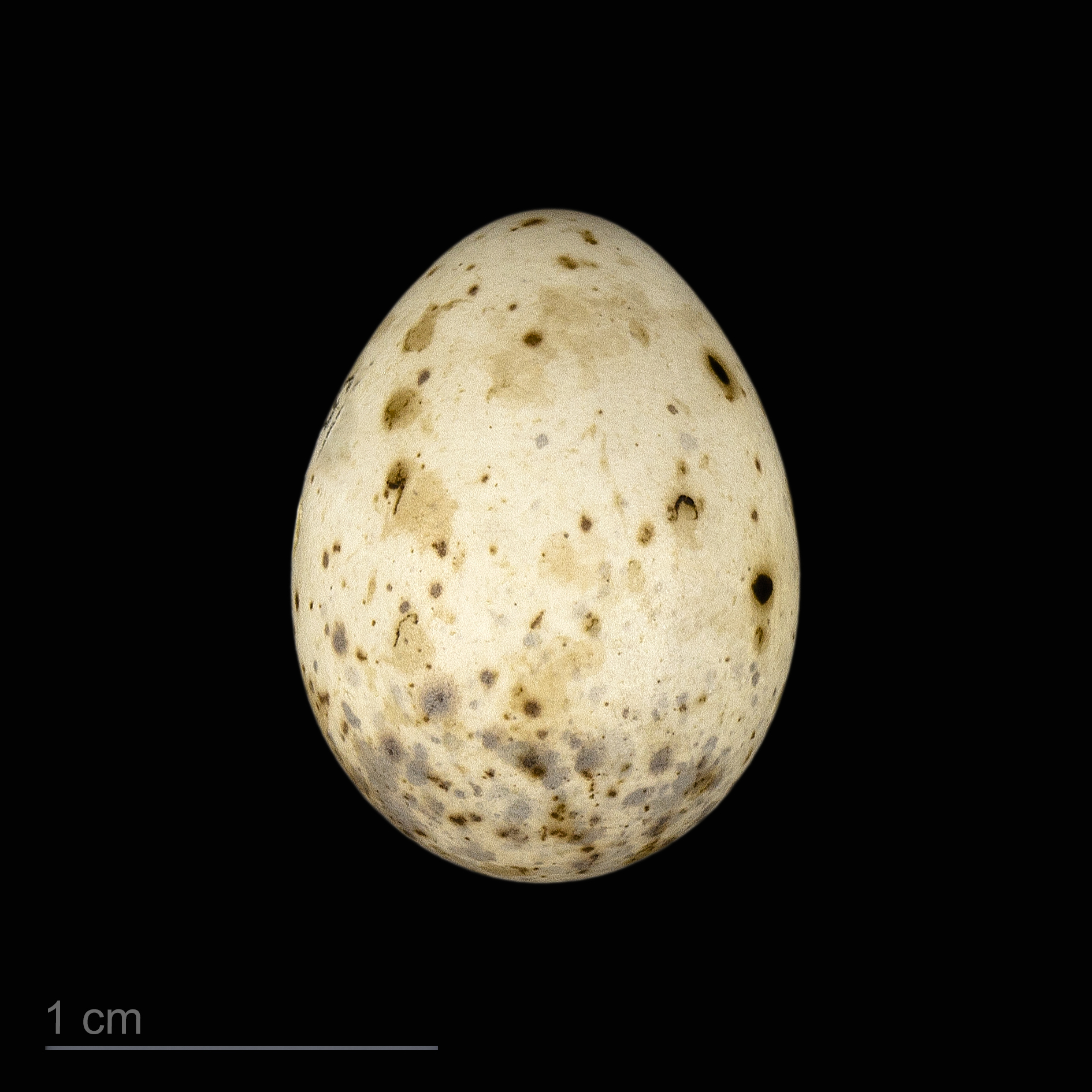
Curruca curruca - MHNT

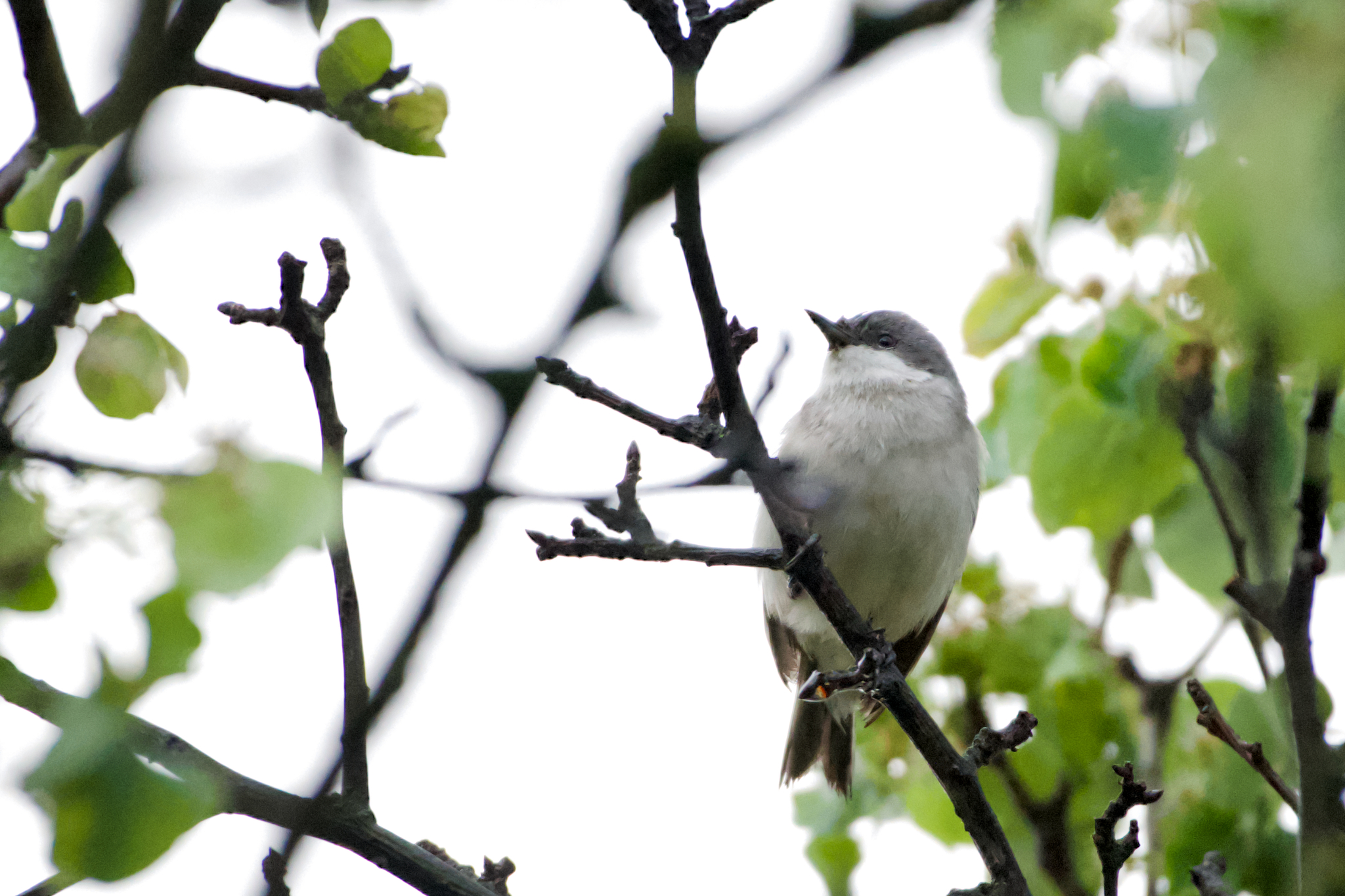
Western lesser whitethroat (C. c. curruca) in Romania
