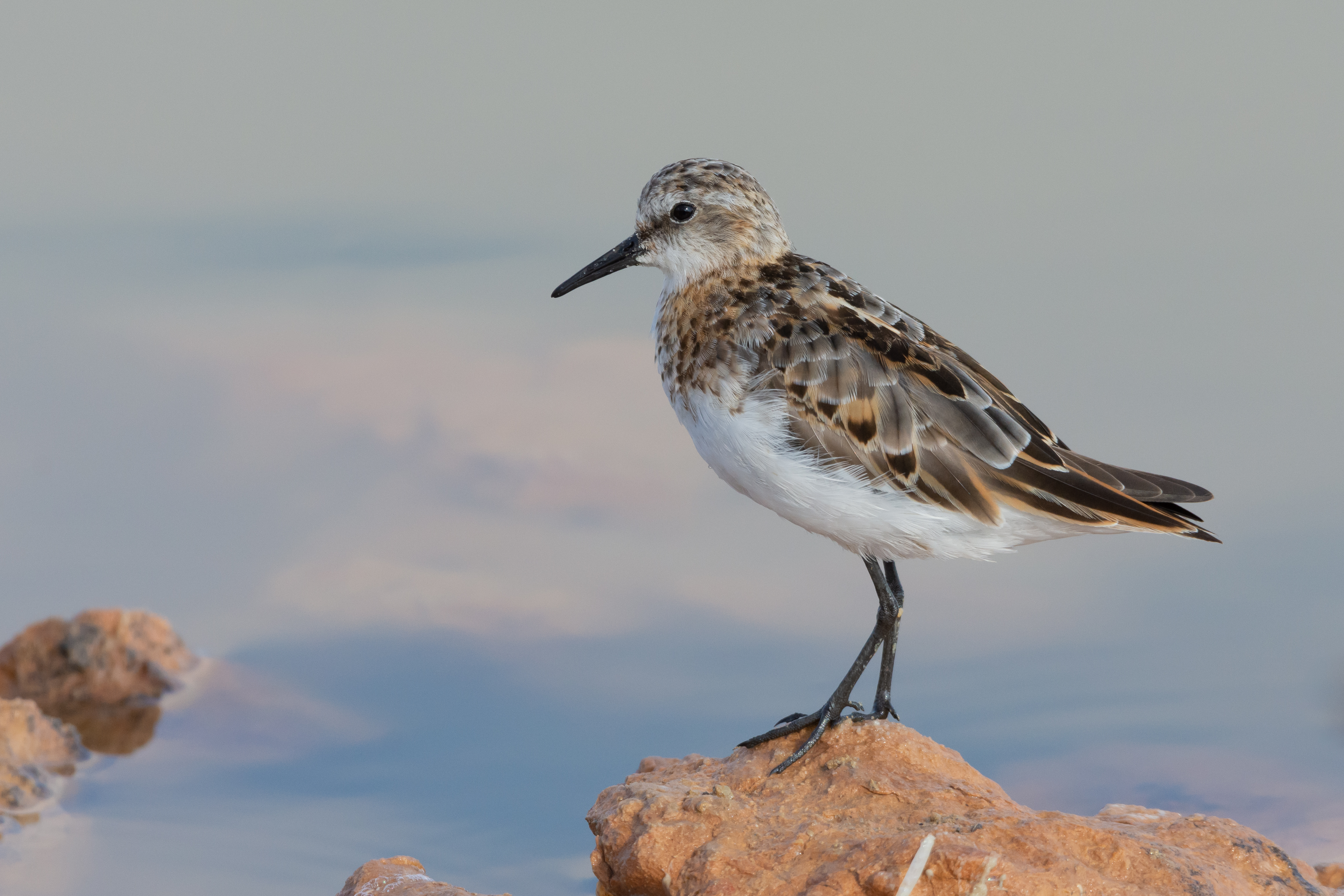
- In Thyna, Tunisia

Conservation status
- Least Concern (IUCN 3.1)

Scientific classification
- Kingdom: Animalia
- Phylum: Chordata
- Class: Aves
- Order: Charadriiformes
- Family: Scolopacidae
- Genus: Calidris
- Species: C. minuta

Binomial name
- Calidris minuta (Leisler, 1812)
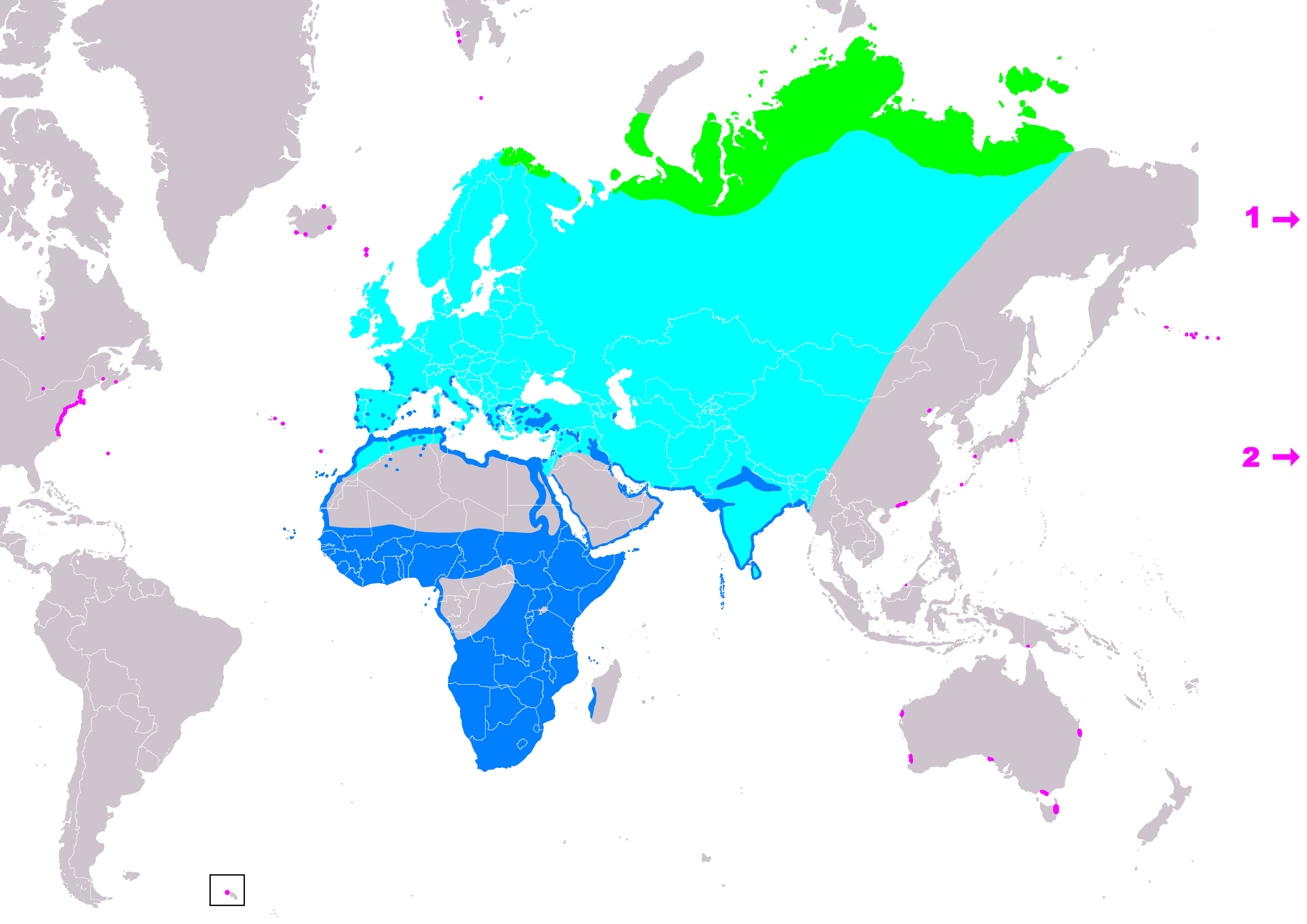
- Range of C. minuta Breeding Passage Non-breeding Vagrant (seasonality uncertain)

Synonyms
- Erolia minuta

= Little stint =

Species of bird

The little stint (Calidris minuta) is a very small wader. It breeds in arctic Europe and Asia, and is a long-distance migrant, wintering south to Africa and south Asia. It occasionally is a vagrant to North America and to Australia. The genus name is from Ancient Greek kalidris or skalidris, a term used by Aristotle for some grey-coloured waterside birds. The specific minuta is Latin for "small.

== Description ==
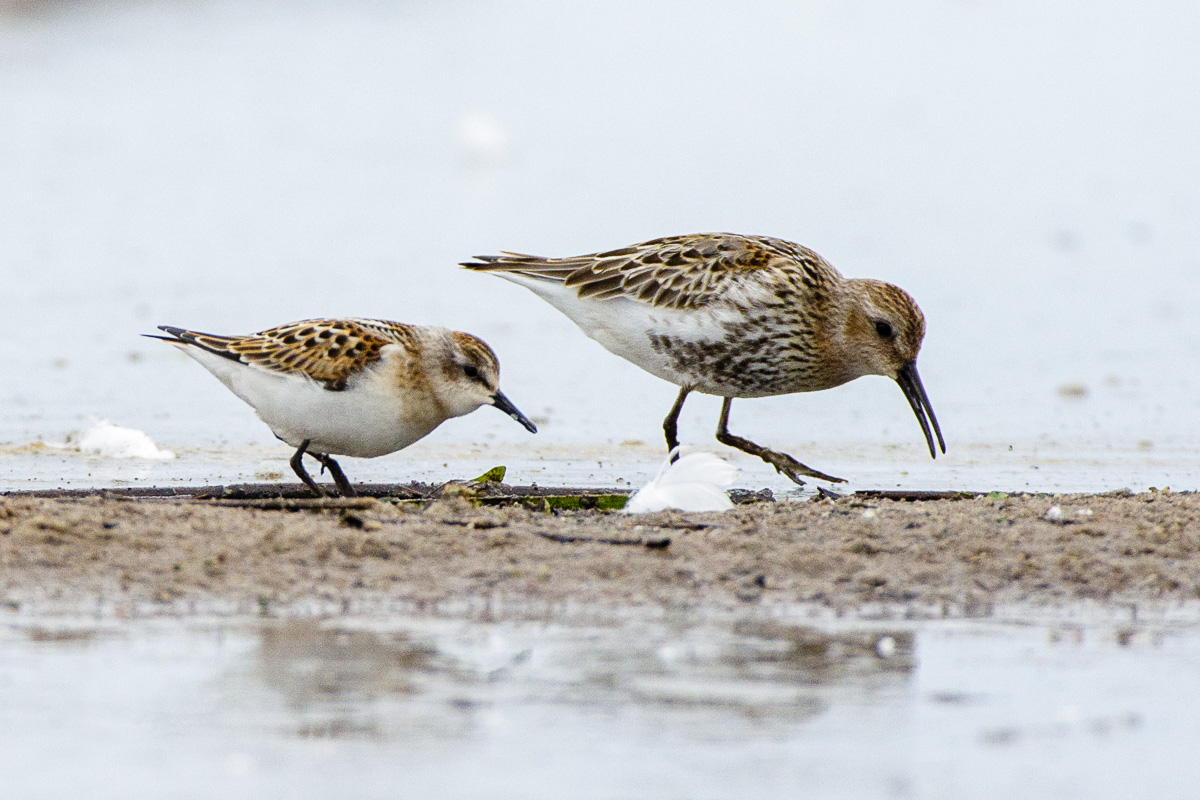
Little stint (on the left) and dunlin in September at the mouth of the Reda river in Puck Bay in Poland. Both birds are juveniles.

Its small size, fine dark bill, dark legs and quicker movements distinguish this species from all waders except the other dark-legged stints. It can be distinguished from these in all plumages by its combination of a fine bill tip, unwebbed toes and long primary projection. The call is a sharp "stit".

The breeding adult has an orange wash to the breast, a white throat and a strong white V on its back. In winter plumage identification is difficult. Juveniles have pale crown stripes and a pinkish breast.

An apparent hybrid between this species and Temminck's stint has been reported from the Netherlands.

== Population dynamics ==
The numbers of this species (and of curlew sandpiper) depend on the population of lemmings. In poor lemming years, predatory species such as skuas and snowy owls take Arctic-breeding waders instead.

It is gregarious in winter, sometimes forming large flocks with other Calidris waders, particularly dunlin, on coastal mudflats or the edges of inland pools.

The little stint is one of the species to which the Agreement on the Conservation of African-Eurasian Migratory Waterbirds (AEWA) applies.

== Nesting ==
This bird nests on a scrape in bare ground, laying 3–5 eggs. It is polygamous, and males and females may incubate separate clutches. Birds prefer to nest in low-lying areas within grassy tundra, often near wetlands.

== Food ==
Food is small invertebrates picked off the mud. During summer in the High Arctic, growing chicks rely heavily on Diptera, particularly Chironomidae, which form nearly half of their diet.

== Gallery ==
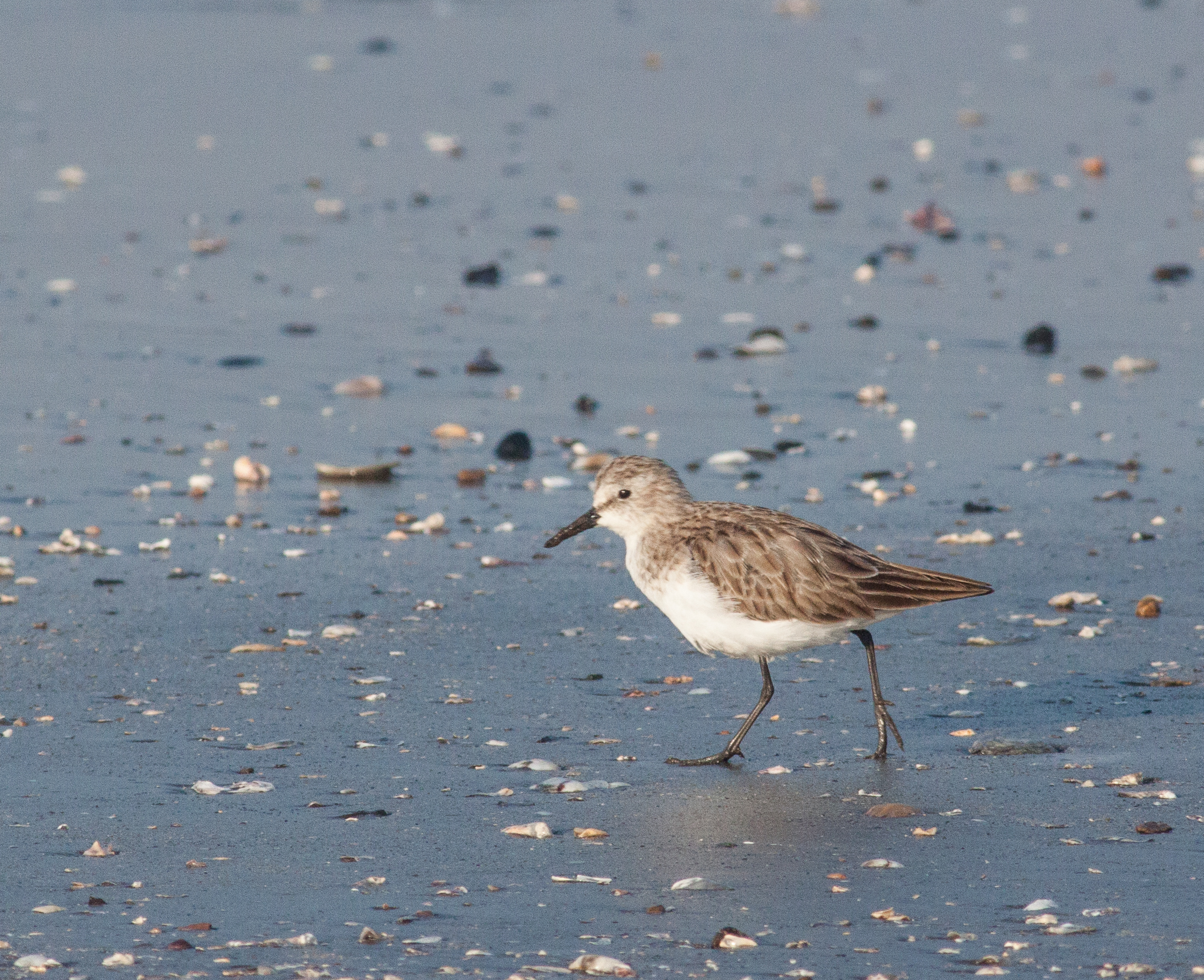
Little stint, non breeding in February, Vasai, Maharashtra, India.

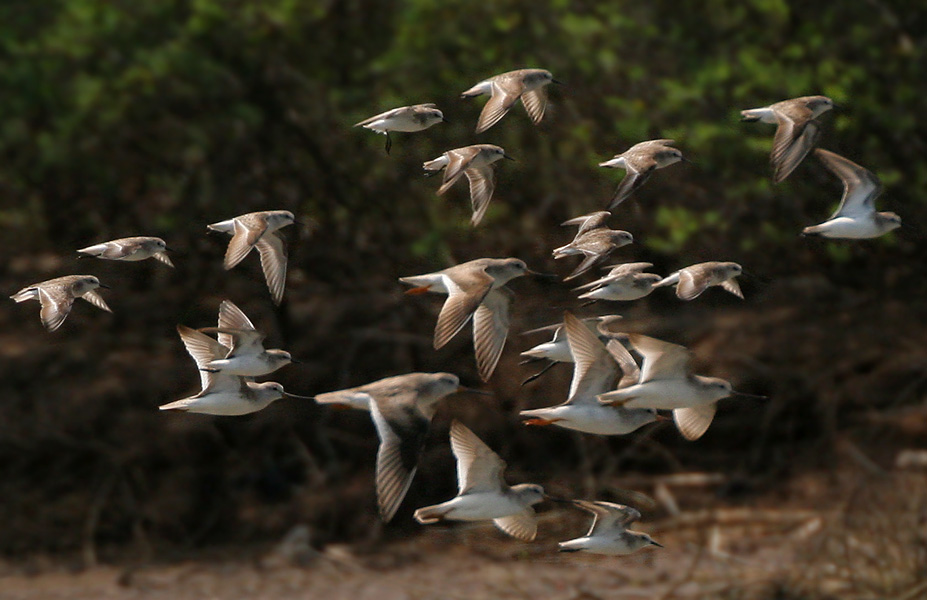
Mixed flock with the larger Terek sandpiper in Andhra Pradesh, India.

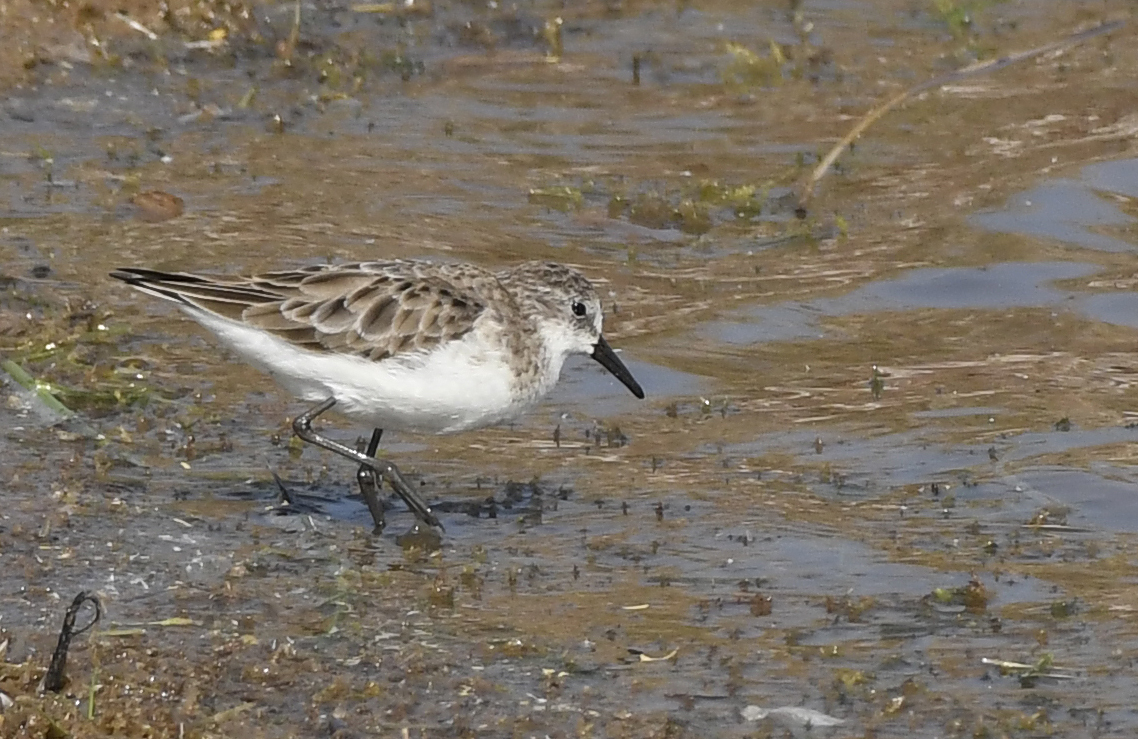
Little Stint at Khijadiya Bird Sanctuary, Gujarat, India

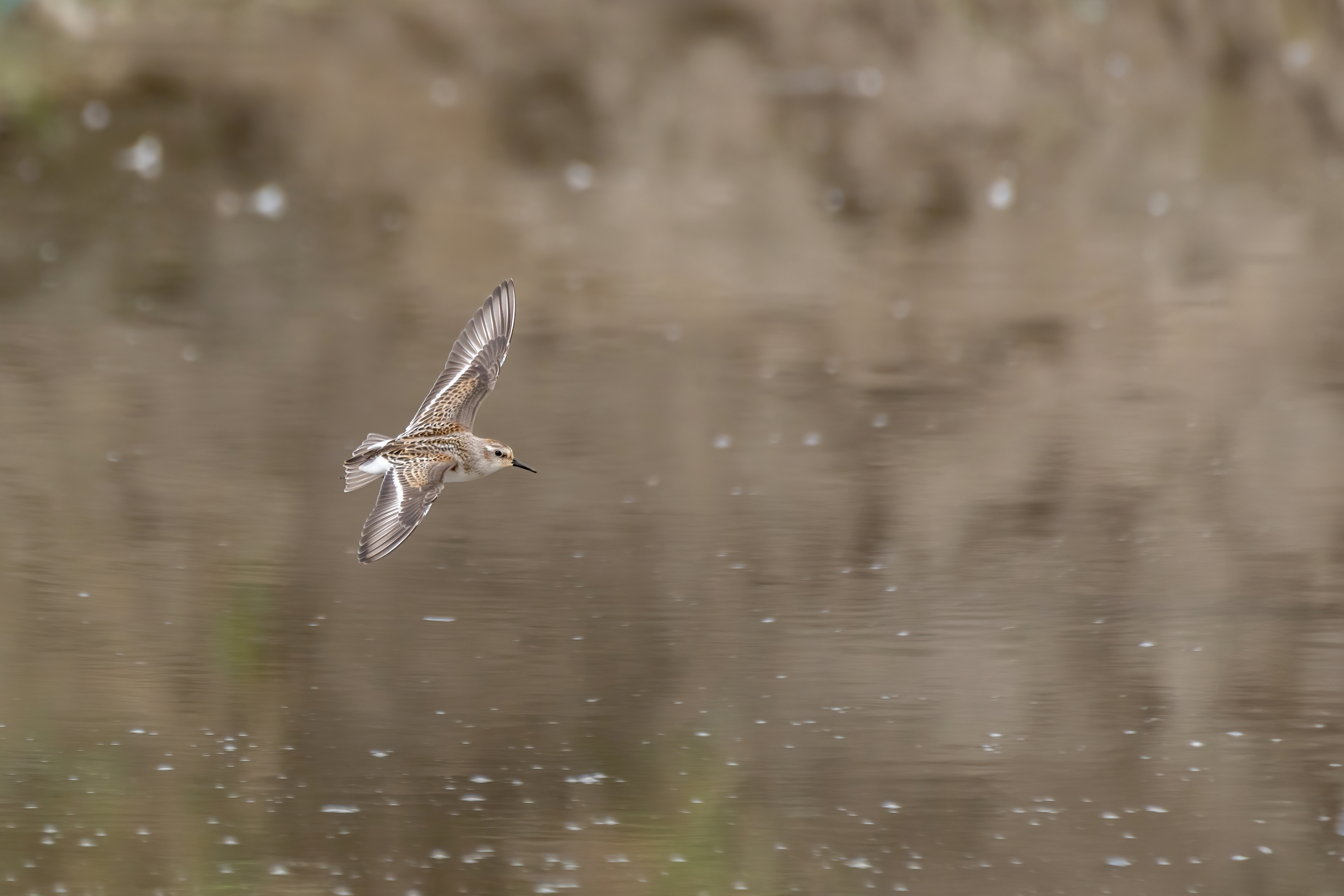
At Manohara River Kathmandu, Nepal.

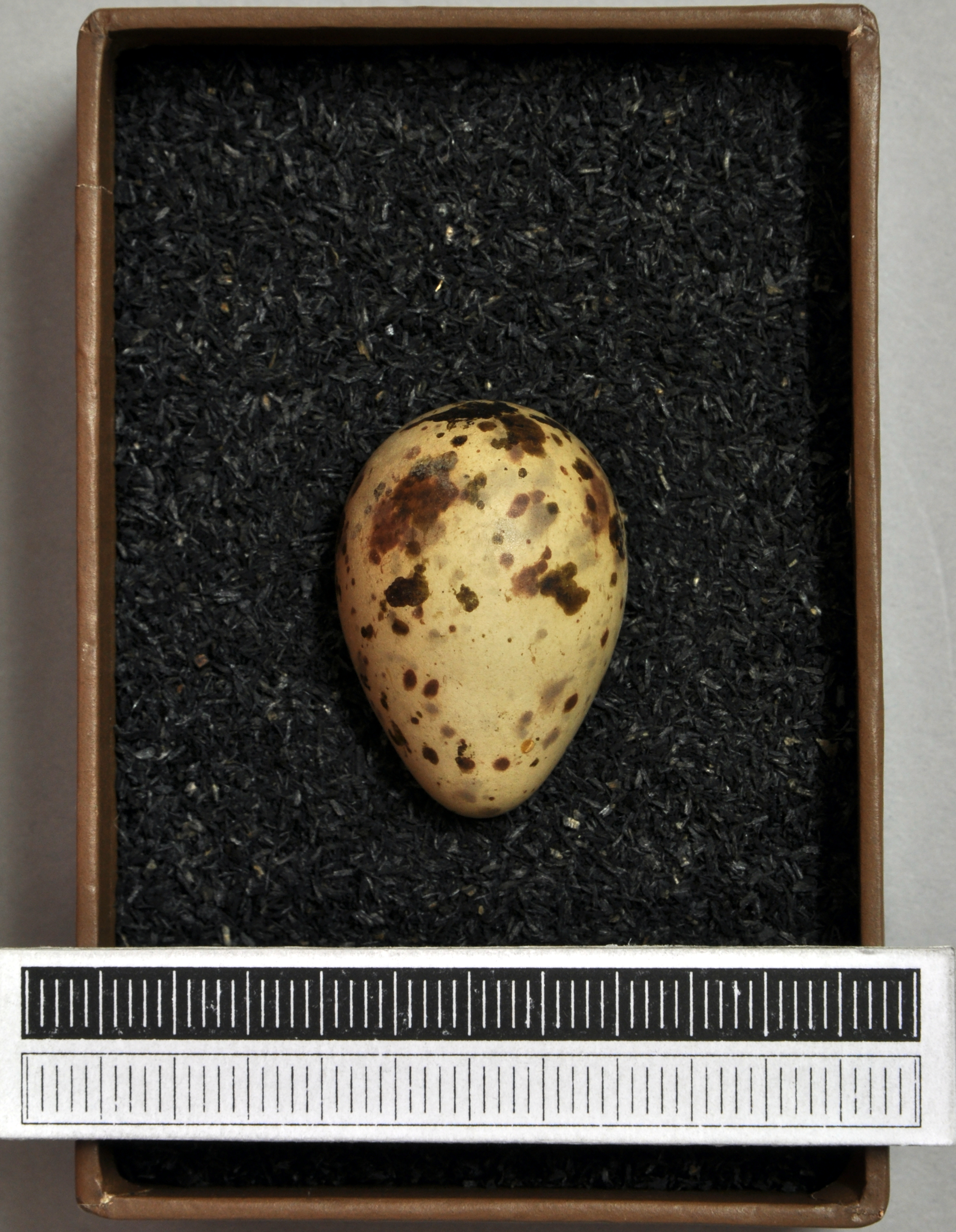
Egg, Collection Museum Wiesbaden, Germany
