= Luise von Ploennies =

German poet (1803–1872)

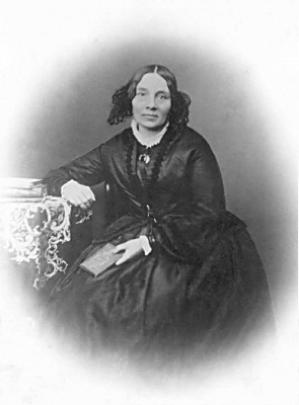
Luise von Ploennies.

Luise von Ploennies (7 November 1803 – 22 January 1872) was a German poet.

== Life ==
She was born at Hanau, the daughter of the naturalist Johann Philipp Achilles Leisler. In 1824 she married the physician August von Ploennies in Darmstadt. After his death in 1847 she resided for some years in Belgium, then at Jugenheim on the Bergstrasse, and finally at Darmstadt, where she died. Between 1844 and 1870 she published several volumes of verse, being particularly happy in eclectic love songs, patriotic poems and descriptions of scenery. She also wrote two biblical dramas, Maria Magdalena (1870) and David (1873).

As a translator from the English, Luise von Ploennies published two collections of poems, Britannia (1843) and Englische Lyriker des 19ten Jahrhunderts (1863, 3rd ed., 1867).
