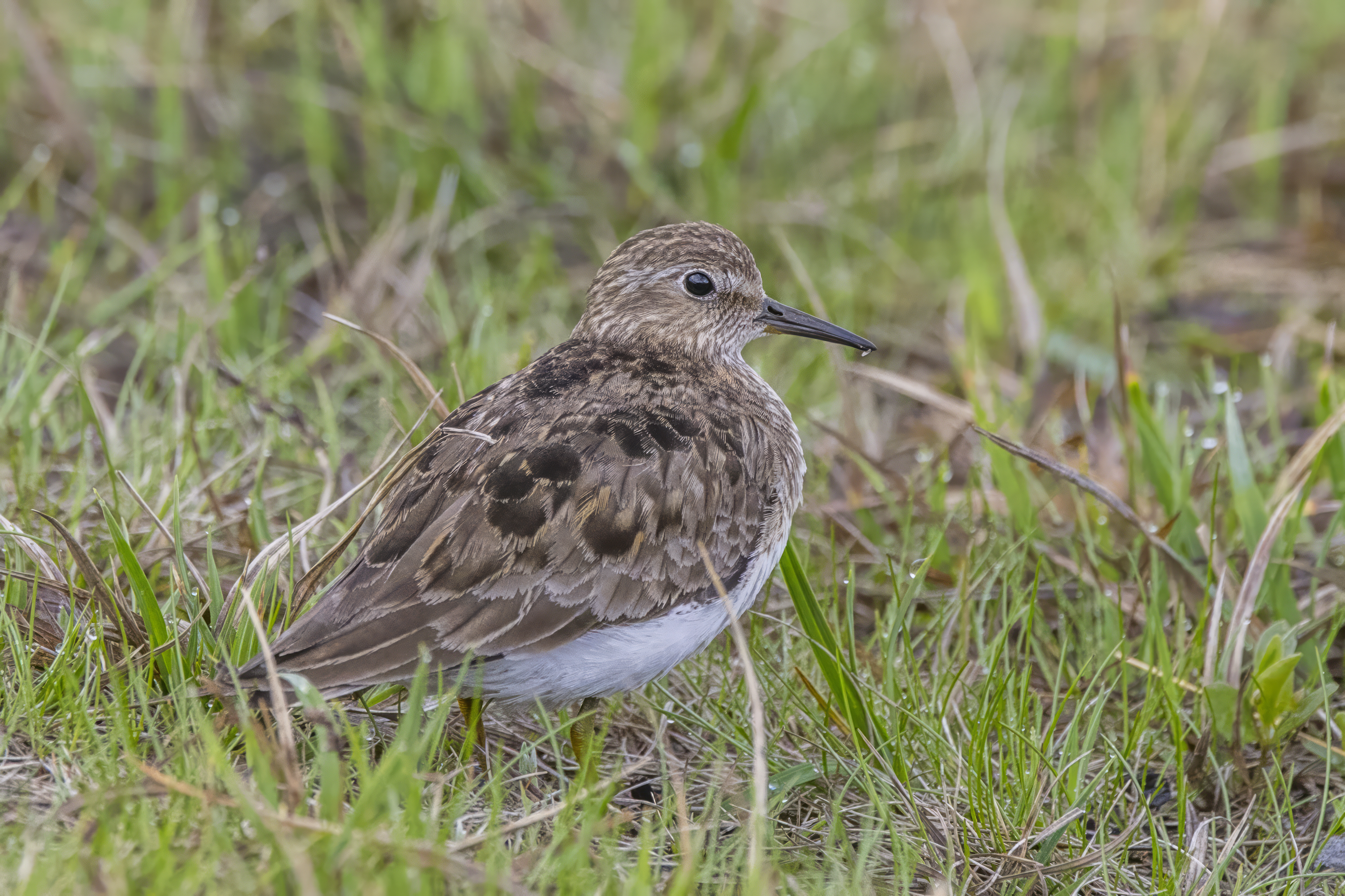
- Adult in breeding plumage, Oppdal, Norway
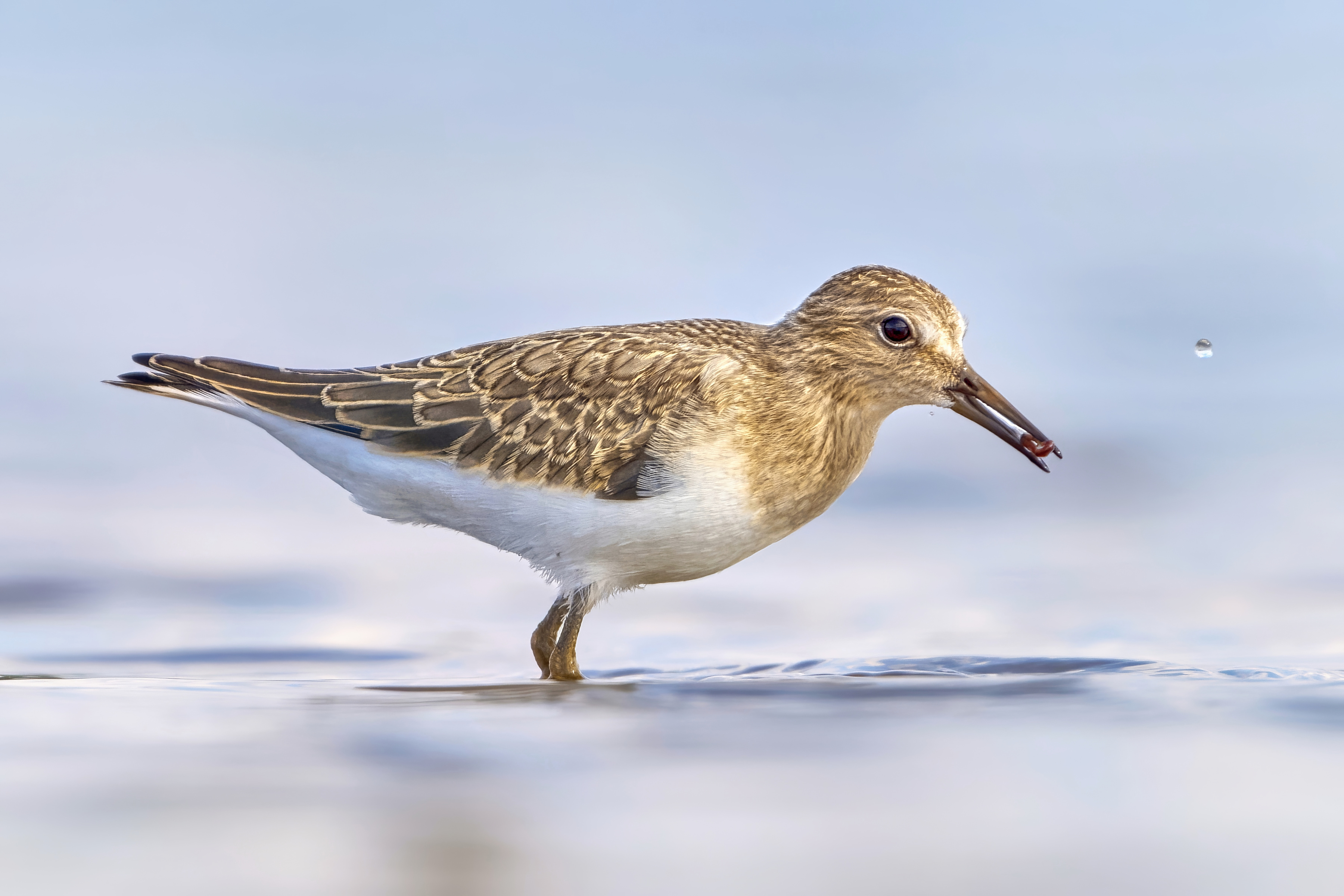
- Juvenile plumage, Russia

Conservation status
- Least Concern (IUCN 3.1)

Scientific classification
- Kingdom: Animalia
- Phylum: Chordata
- Class: Aves
- Order: Charadriiformes
- Family: Scolopacidae
- Genus: Calidris
- Species: C. temminckii

Binomial name
- Calidris temminckii (Leisler, 1812)
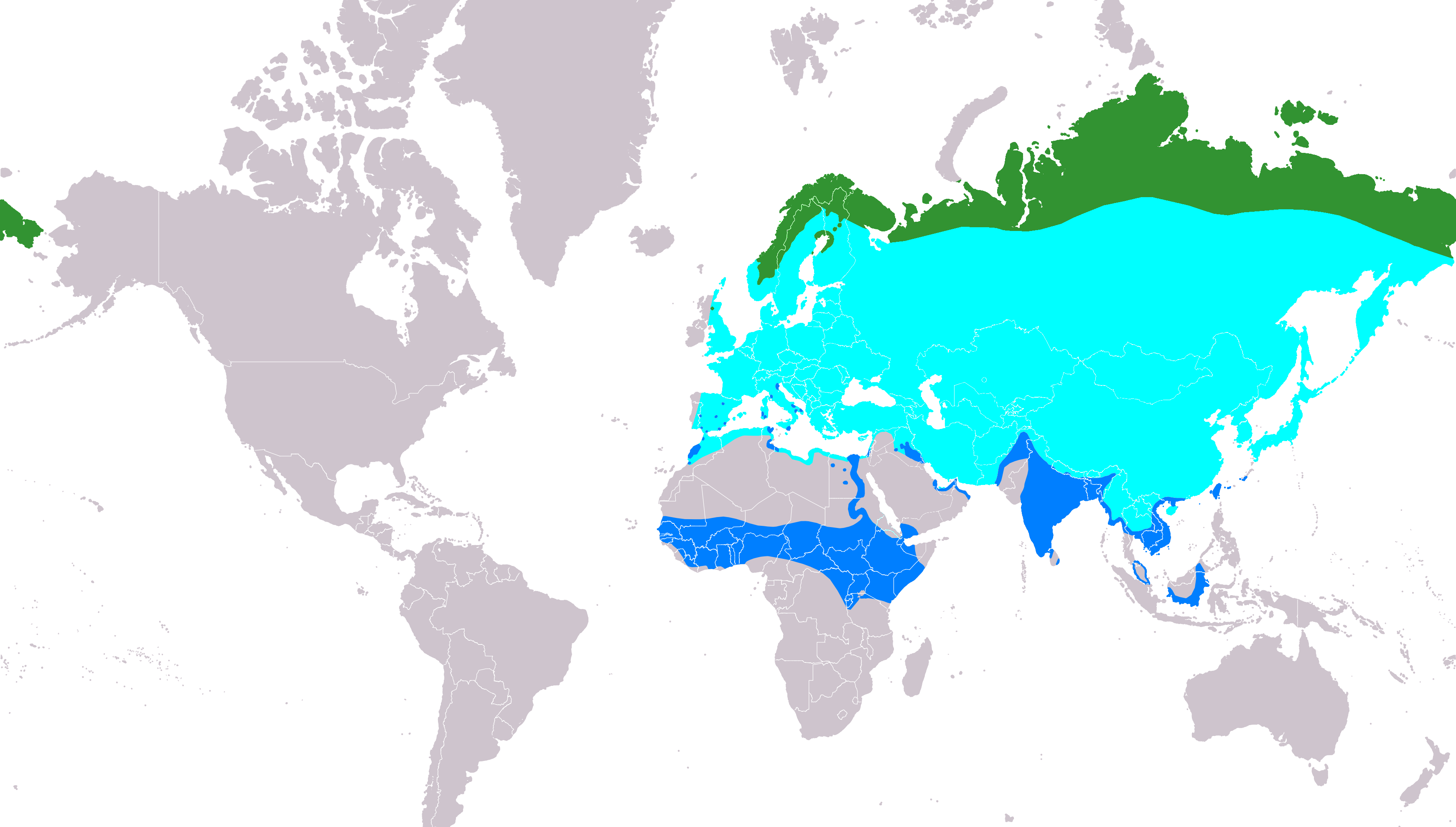
- Range of C. temminckii Breeding Passage Non-breeding

Synonyms
- Erolia temminckii

= Temminck's stint =

Species of bird

Song

Temminck's stint (Calidris temminckii) is a small wader native to the Old World. This bird's common name and Latin binomial commemorate the Dutch naturalist Coenraad Jacob Temminck. The genus name is from Ancient Greek kalidris or skalidris, a term used by Aristotle for some grey-coloured waterside birds.

Within the genus Calidris, Temminck's stint is most closely related to the long-toed stint (Calidris subminuta).

Temminck's stint is one of the species to which the Agreement on the Conservation of African-Eurasian Migratory Waterbirds (AEWA) applies.

== Description ==
These birds are very small waders, at 13.5–15 cm (5.3–5.9 in) length. They are similar in size to the little stint (Calidris minuta) but shorter legged and longer winged. The legs are dull yellowish or brown, and the outer tail feathers white, in contrast to little stint's black legs and grey outer tail feathers.

This is a rather drab wader, with mainly plain brown upperparts and head, and underparts white apart from a darker breast. The breeding adult has some brighter rufous and/or blackish mantle feathers to relieve the generally undistinguished appearance. In winter plumage, the general appearance recalls a tiny version of common sandpiper, dull grey to greenish-grey or brownish-grey above and on the upper breast, and white below.

The call is a loud trill.

== Breeding ==
This stint's breeding habitat is bogs and marshes in the taiga of Arctic northern Europe and Asia. It breeds from southern Scandinavia and occasionally Scotland, east right across northern Russia to the Chukotski Peninsula. It has a distinctive hovering display flight. It nests in a scrape on the ground, laying 3–4 eggs. Temminck's stint is strongly migratory, wintering at freshwater sites in tropical Africa, the Indian subcontinent and parts of Southeast Asia.

Temminck's stints have an intriguing breeding and parental care system in which males and female parents incubate separate clutches, typically in different locations. Males establish small territories and mate with a female who lays a first clutch of eggs. She then moves to a second territory and mate, and lays a second clutch that she incubates herself. Concurrently, her first male may mate with an incoming second female, who lays her second clutch on his territory. The male thereafter incubates his first mate's first clutch alone.

An apparent hybrid between this species and the little stint has been reported from the Netherlands.

== Feeding ==
These birds forage in soft mud with some vegetation, mainly picking up food by sight. They have a distinctive feeding behaviour, creeping steadily along the edges of pools. They mostly eat insects and other small invertebrates. They are not as gregarious as many other Calidris waders, and rarely form large flocks.

== Gallery ==
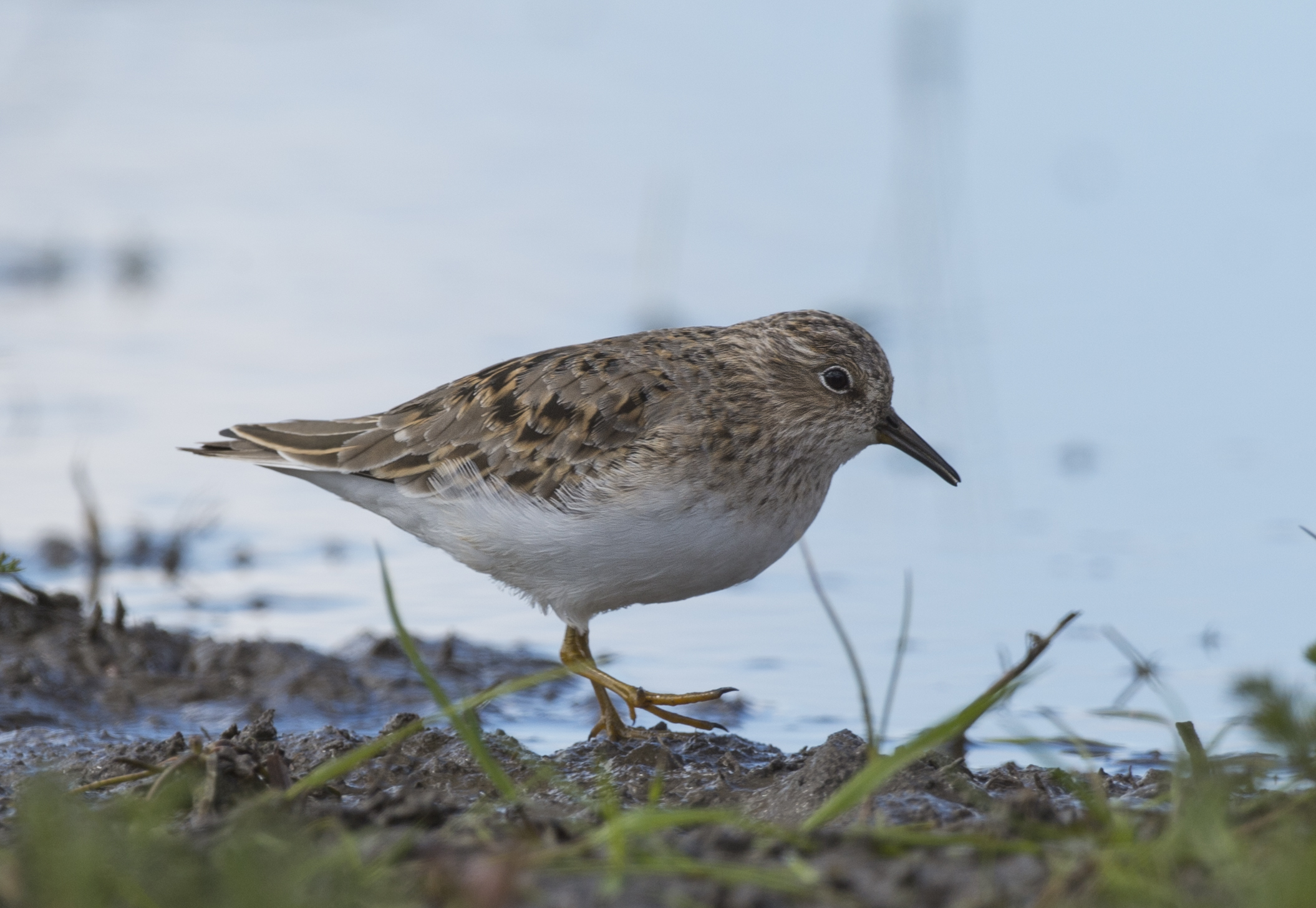
Moulting into summer plumage on spring passage, southern Sweden

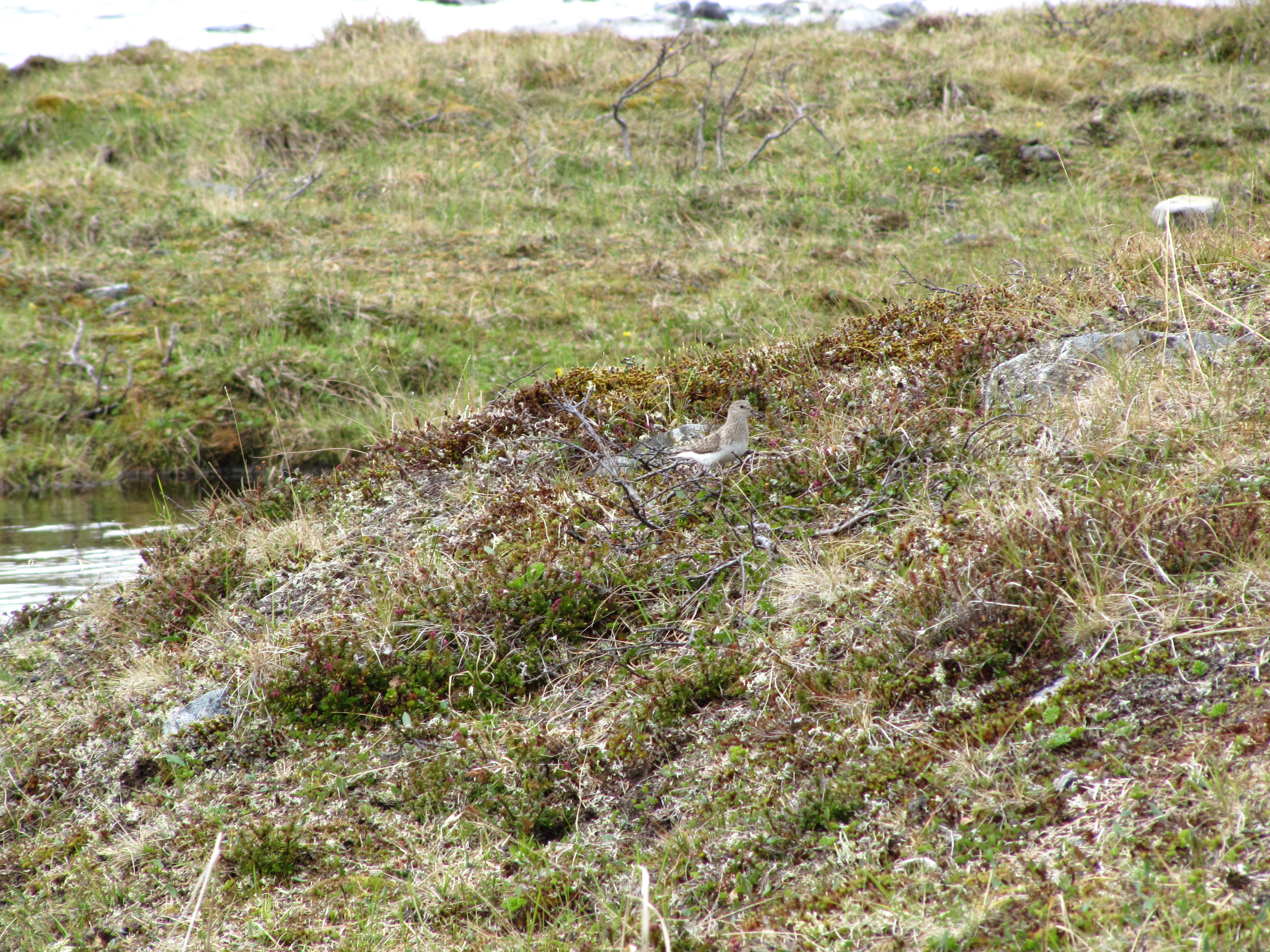
Breeding habitat with bird showing camouflage, Finland

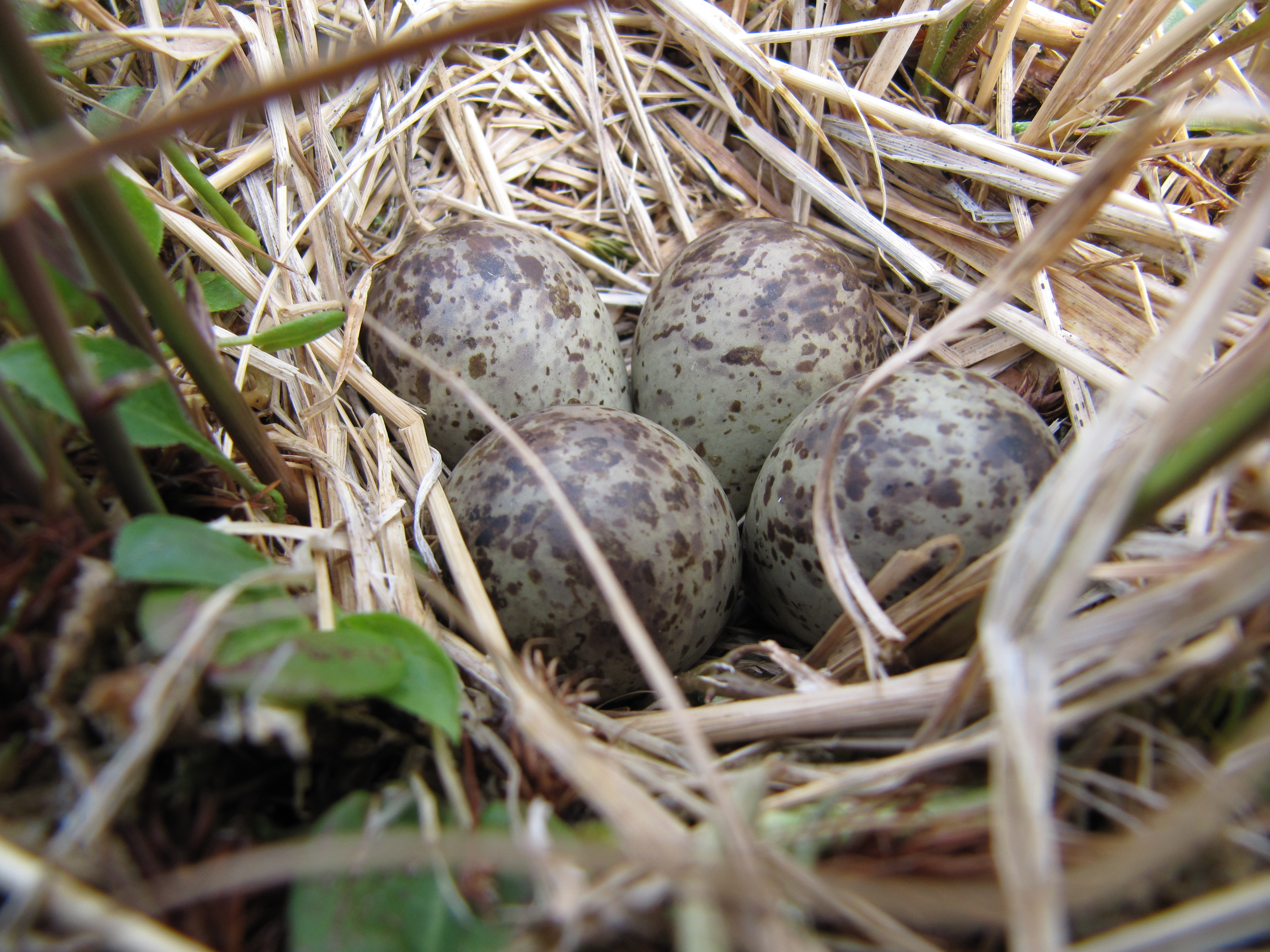
Nest with eggs, Finland

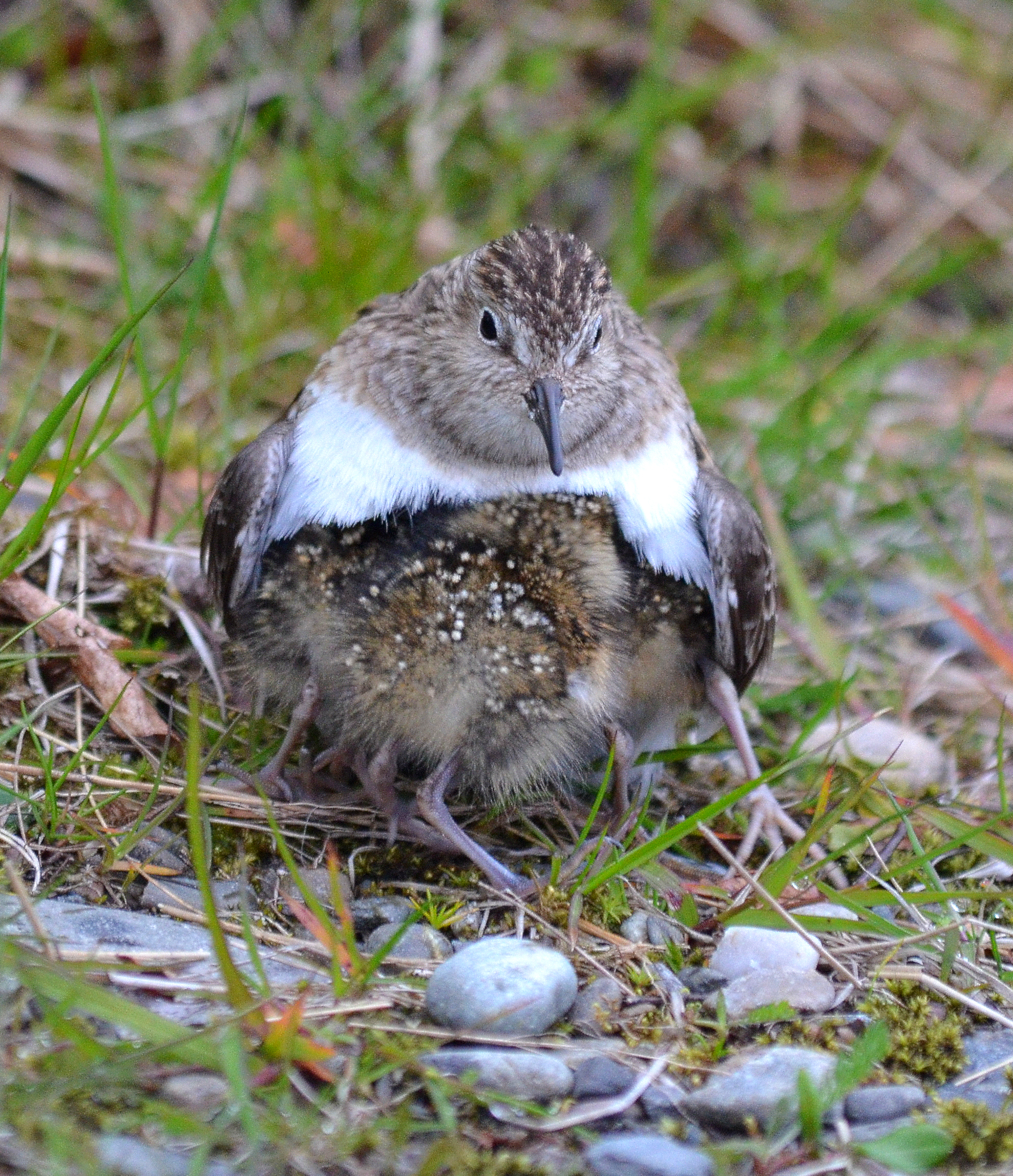
Adult brooding chicks, Varanger Peninsula, Norway

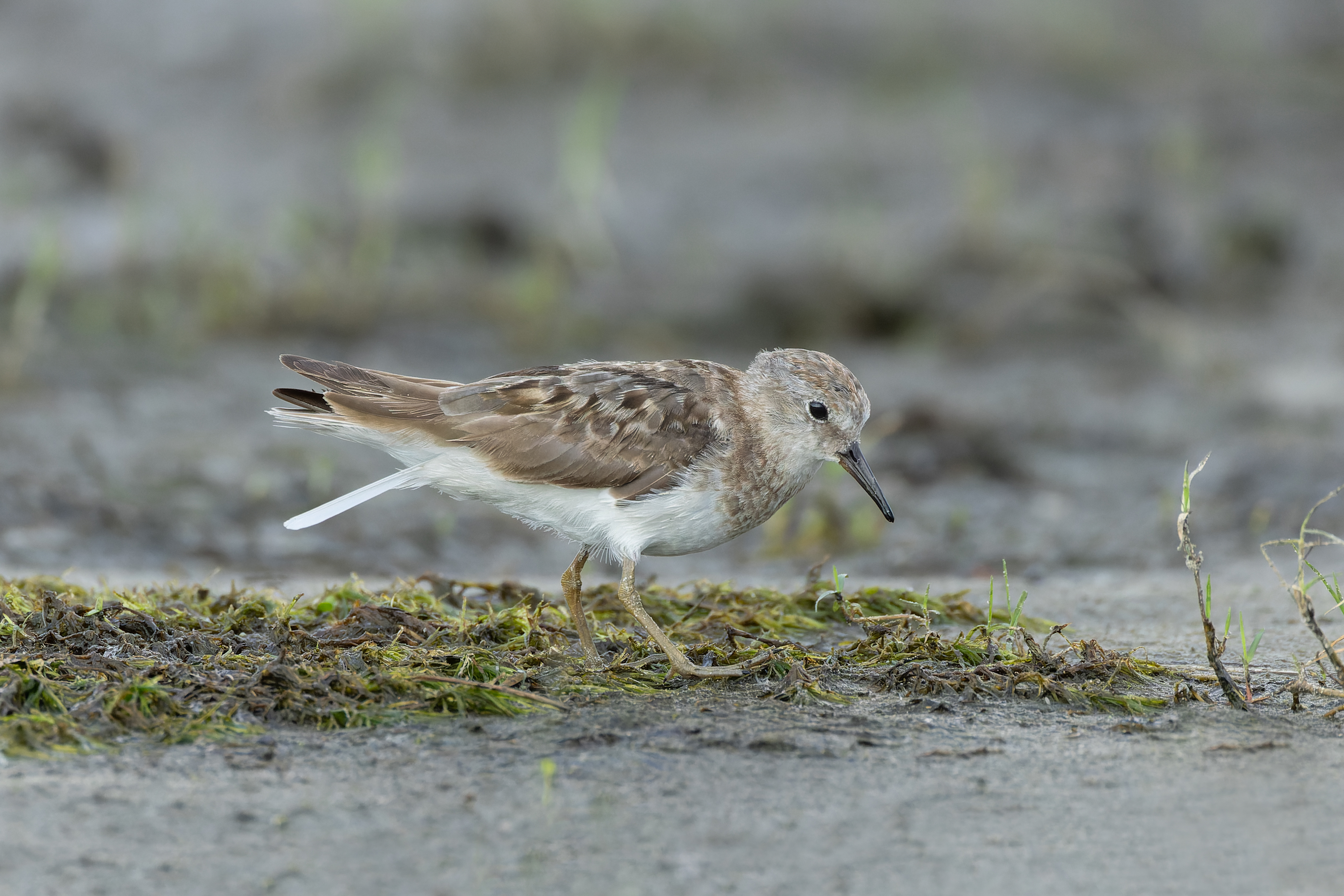
Moulting into winter plumage in autumn, West Bengal, India

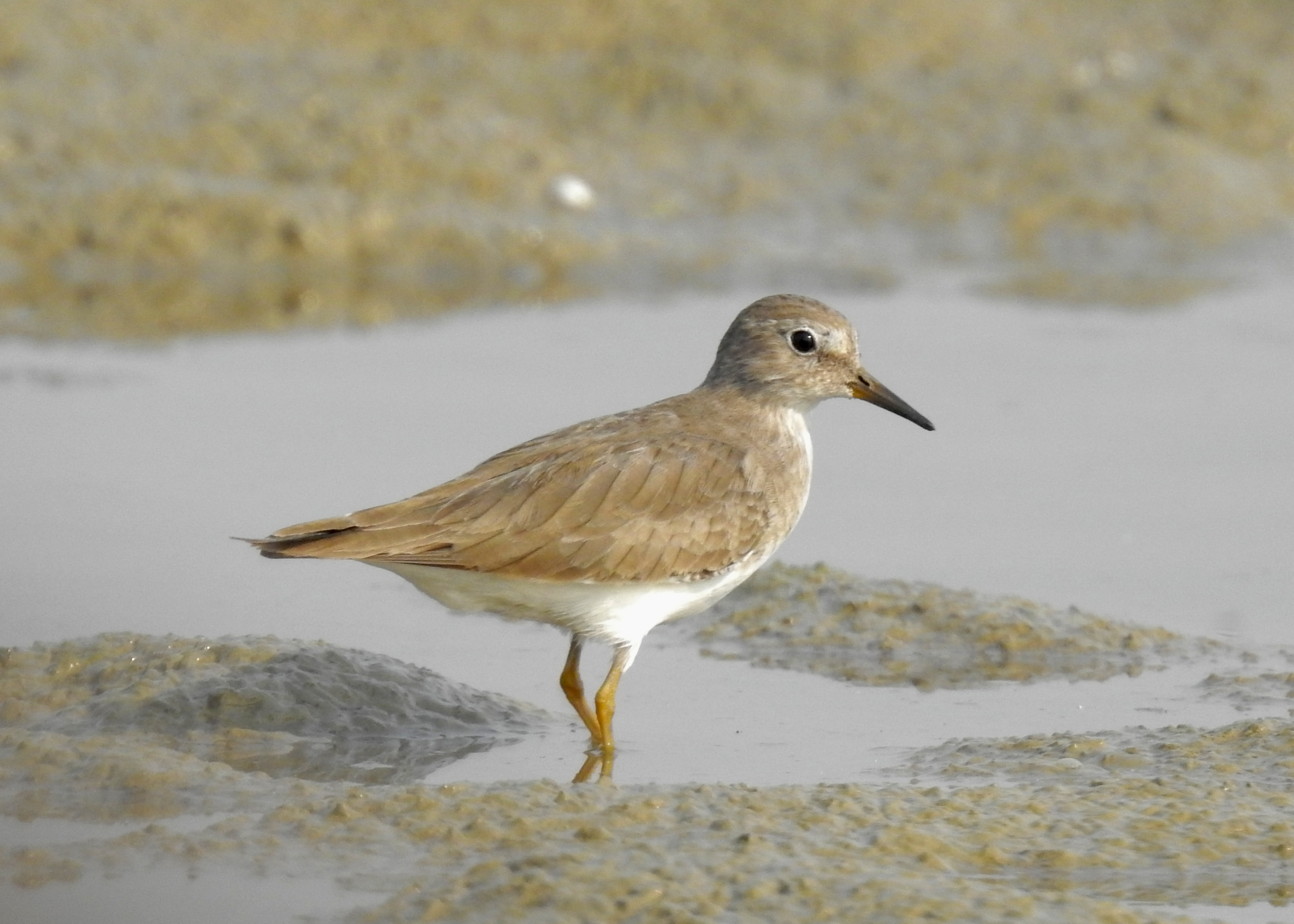
Winter plumage in West Bengal, India

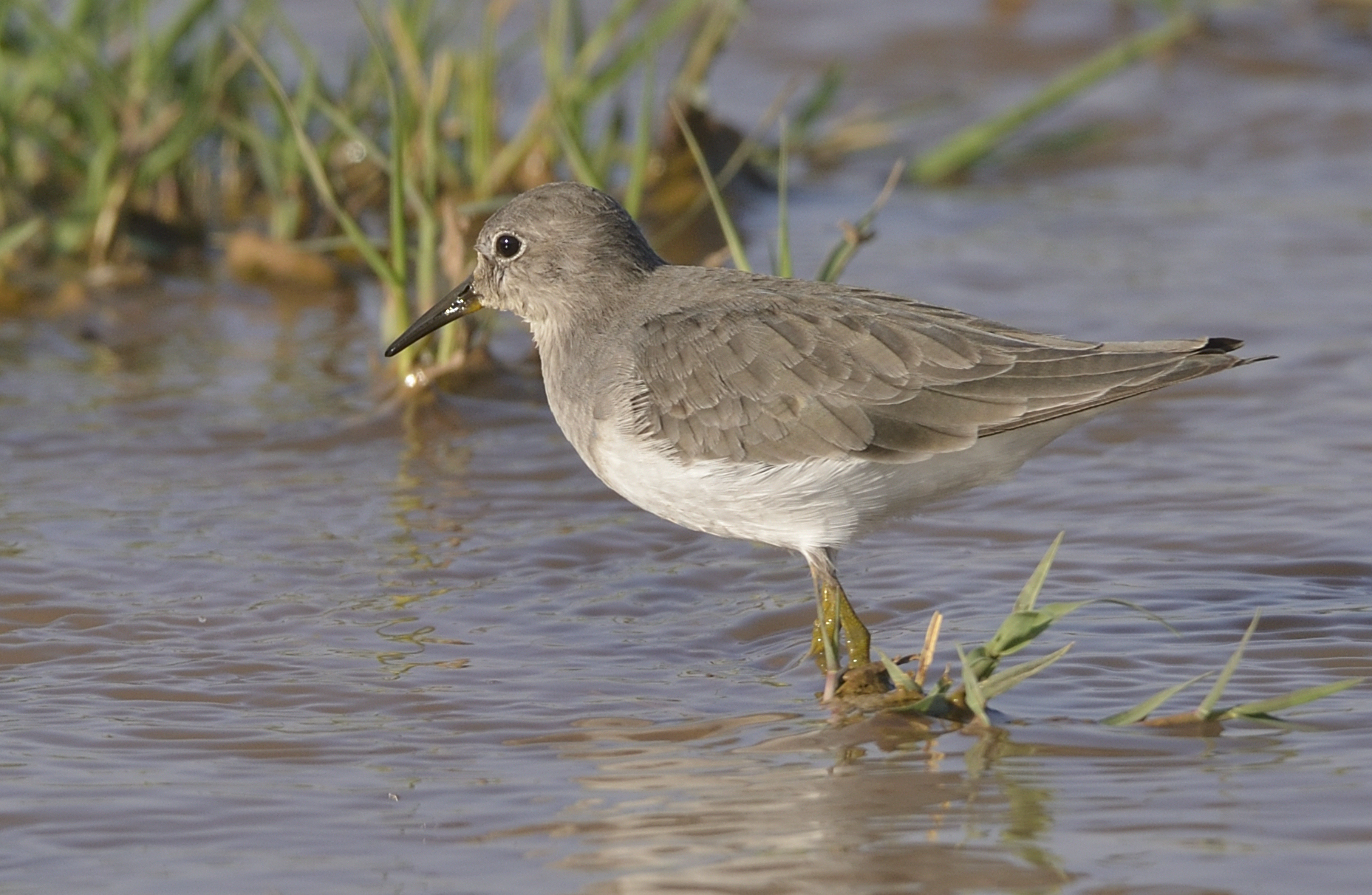
Winter plumage in Turkish Kurdistan.

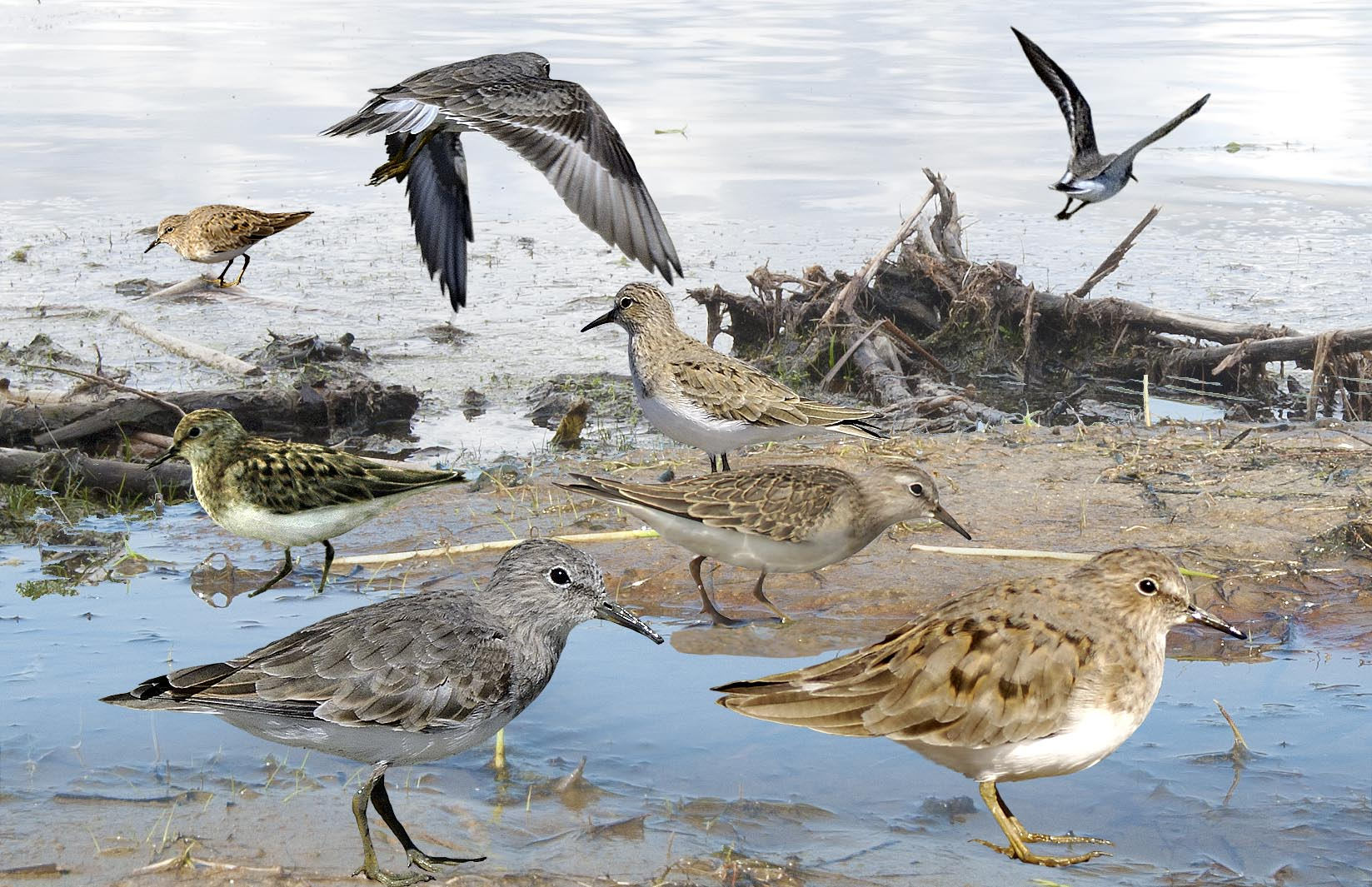
ID composite
