= V. B. Banjkowski =

Russian ornithologist

Vyacheslav Bronislavovich Banjkowski (also spelled Banjkovski, Bańkowski) (Russian: Вячеслав Брониславович Баньковский; 1889 - 8 December 1912) was a Russian ornithologist. He was a student of geography at the Imperial Moscow University and was a pioneer of avifaunal study in the Caucasus and beyond in Georgia.

== Life and work ==
Banjkowski collected more than 15000 specimens from Transcaucasia and in 1910 he processed his collections. He served on a faunal committee under G.A. Kozhevnikova to study the fauna of the Moscow region. He published six papers between 1911 and 1912 which included the descriptions of several new taxa including a subspecies of the greater short-toed lark Calandrella brachydactyla artemisiana Banjkowski, 1913 and a treecreeper subspecies Certhia familiaris buturlini in 1912 (which is considered a synonym of C. f. caucasica). Along with S. I. Ognev, he described Sylvia curruca caucasica. His brother Leonid Bronislavovich Banjkowski (1894-1918), who assisted on field trips, took an interest in insects and collected beetles which are now held in the Tbilisi museum. Banjkowski was working on Saxicola specimens at the time of his death at the age of 23. He shot himself on the night of the November 25th (old style date) and the reasons for the suicide are unknown.

Major publications include:

- Баньковский В.Б. (1913). "К орнитофауне Закавказья, преимущественно Тифлисской губернии". Известия Кавказскаго музея. 7 (3–4): 205–286.
- Баньковский В.Б. (1912). "К орнитофауне Закавказья". Орнитологический вестник. М. (4): 325.
- Баньковский В.Б. (1913). "К орнитофауне Закавказья, преимущественно Тифлисской губернии". Известия Кавказского музея. Тифлис (in Russian). 7 (3–4): 205–286.
- Баньковский В.Б. (1913). "К систематике русских представителей рода Scops Savigny (1809)". Известия Кавказского музея. Тифлис. 7 (2): 142–162.
- Баньковский В.Б. (1912). "К систематическому положению крымской пищухи". Орнитологический вестник. М. (2): 160–162.
- Баньковский В.Б. "Поездка на восточное побережье Каспийского моря в июне 1912 года". Известия Кавказского отдела имп. Русского географического общества. Тифлис, 1911-1912 (in Russian). 21 (4): 331–356.
