= Johann Philipp Achilles Leisler =

German physician and naturalist

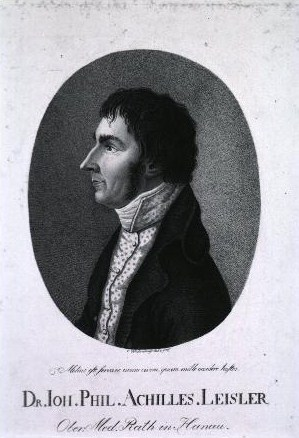
- Johann Philipp Achilles Leisler
- Born: 1 August 1772; Hanau, Germany
- Died: 8 December 1813 (aged 42); Hanau, Germany
- Known for: Naming some birds
- Children: Luise von Ploennies (daughter)
- Scientific career
- Fields: Medicine, zoology
- Author abbrev. (zoology): Leisler

Johann Philipp Achilles Leisler (1 August 1771 or 1772 – 8 December 1813) was a German physician and naturalist.

Leisler named a number of birds, including the Temminck's stint, which he named after his friend Coenraad Jacob Temminck (1778–1858). He is commemorated in Leisler's bat, Nyctalus leisleri, first described by Heinrich Kuhl (1797–1821).

He was a founding member of the Wetterauischen Gesellschaft für die gesamte Naturkunde (Wetterauische Society for Natural History) at Hanau.

His daughter, Luise von Ploennies (1803–1872), was known for her poetry and dramas.

== Publications ==
- Populäres Naturrecht: Reines Naturrecht, 1799 - Popular natural law: Pure natural law.
- Nachträge zu Bechsteins Naturgeschichte Deutschlands, 1812 - Addenda to Bechstein's natural history of Germany.
