= List of birds of India =

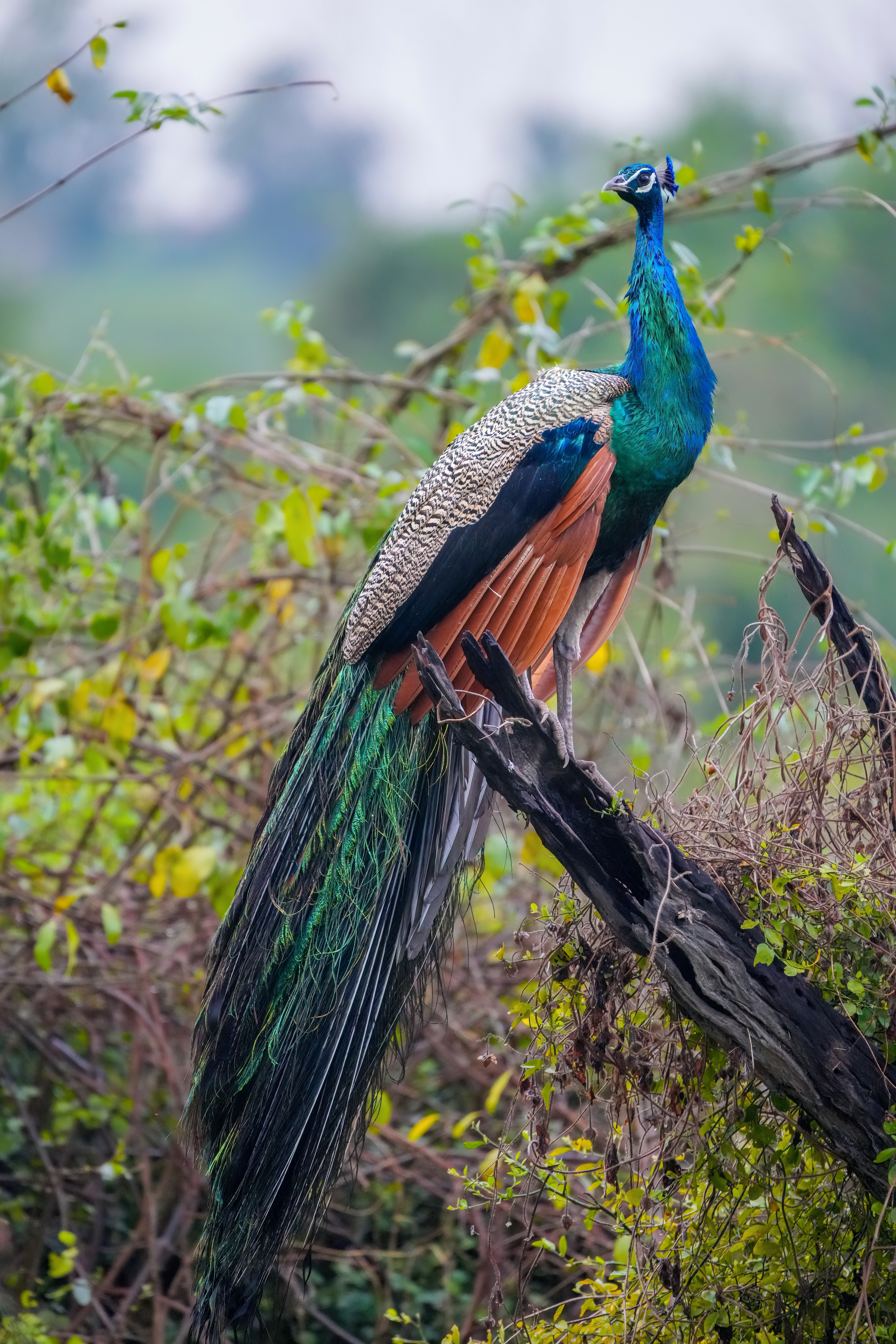
The Indian peafowl (Pavo cristatus) is the national bird of India.

This is a list of the bird species of India and includes extant and recently extinct species recorded within the political limits of the Republic of India as defined by the Indian government. There have been 1396 species recorded as of 2025, of which 84 are endemic to the country. 98 species are globally threatened. The Indian peacock (Pavo cristatus) is the national bird of India. This list does not cover species in Indian jurisdiction areas such as Dakshin Gangotri and oceanic species are delineated by an arbitrary cutoff distance. The list does not include fossil bird species or escapees from captivity.

This list's taxonomic treatment (designation and sequence of orders, families and species) and nomenclature (common and scientific names) follow the conventions of the IOC World Bird List, version 13.1. This list also uses British English throughout. Any bird names or other wording follows that convention.

The following tags have been used to highlight several categories. The commonly occurring native species do not fit within any of these categories.

- (V) Vagrant - Also known as a rarity, it refers to a species that rarely or accidentally occurs in India-typically less than ten confirmed records.
- (E) Endemic - a species endemic to India
- (Ex) Local extinction - a species that no longer occurs in India although populations exist elsewhere

== Ducks, geese, and waterfowl ==
Order: Anseriformes Family: Anatidae

Anatidae includes the ducks and most duck-like waterfowl, such as geese and swans. These birds are adapted to an aquatic existence with webbed feet, flattened bills, and feathers that are excellent at shedding water due to an oily coating. There are 45 species which have been recorded in India.

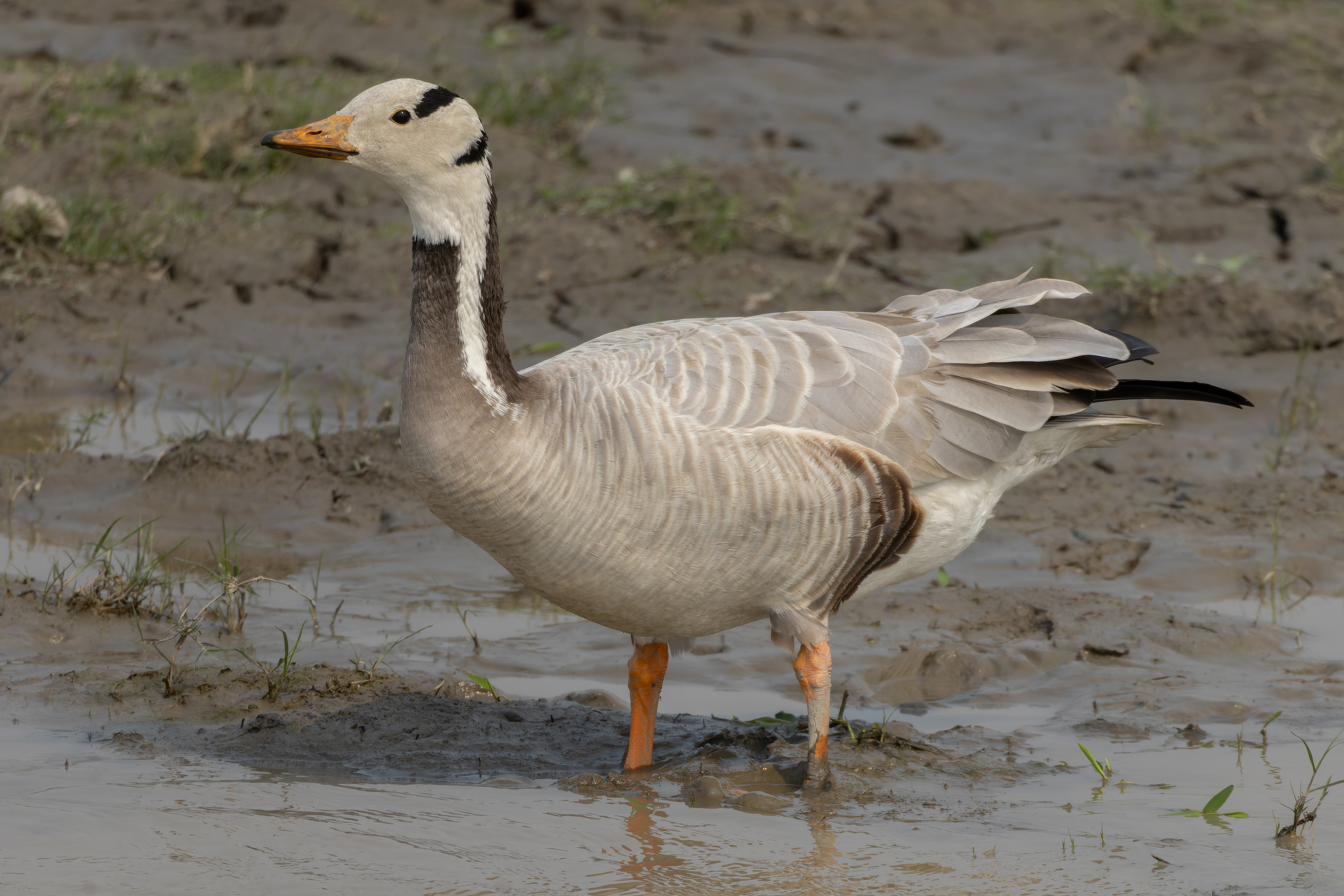
Bar-headed goose

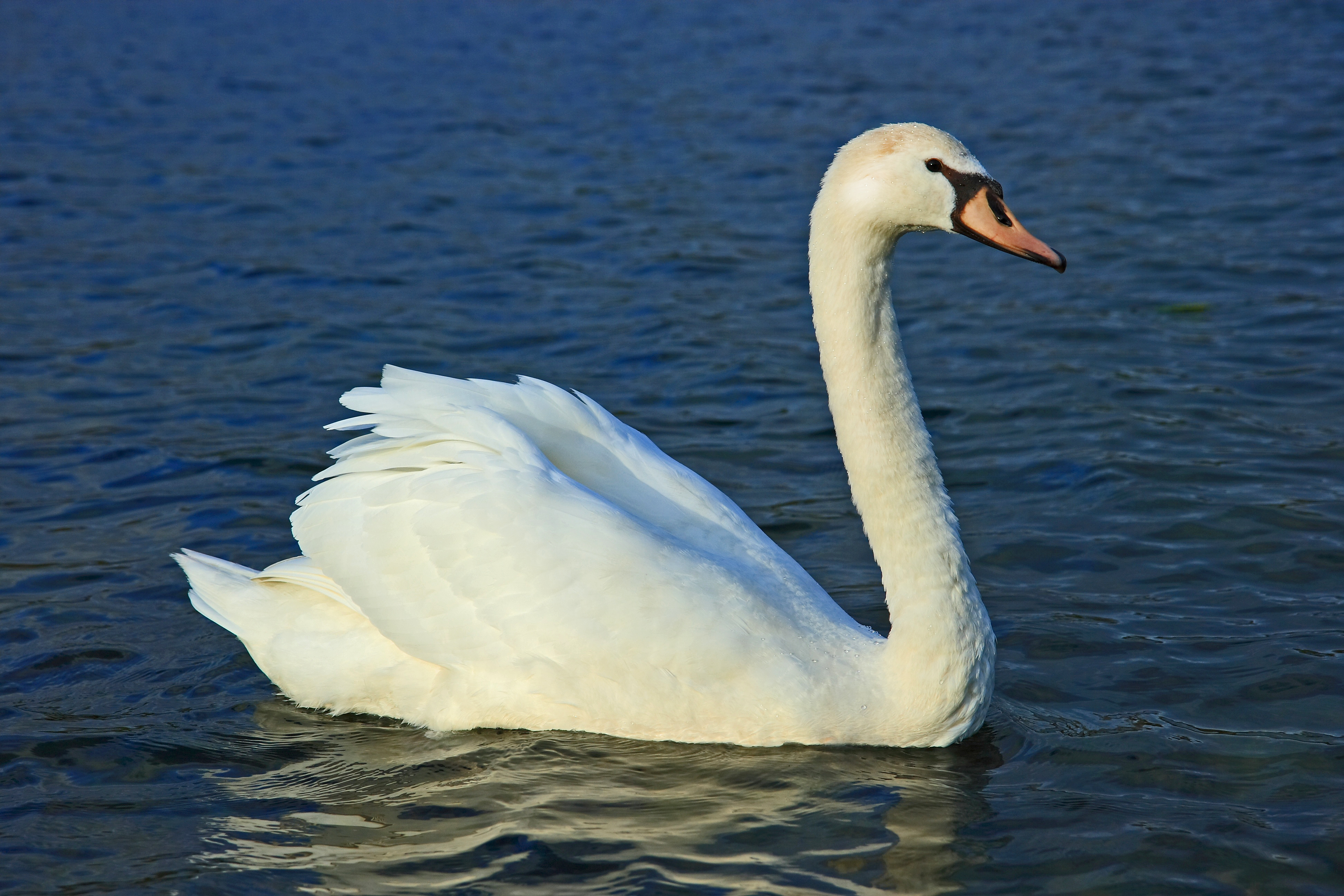
Mute swan

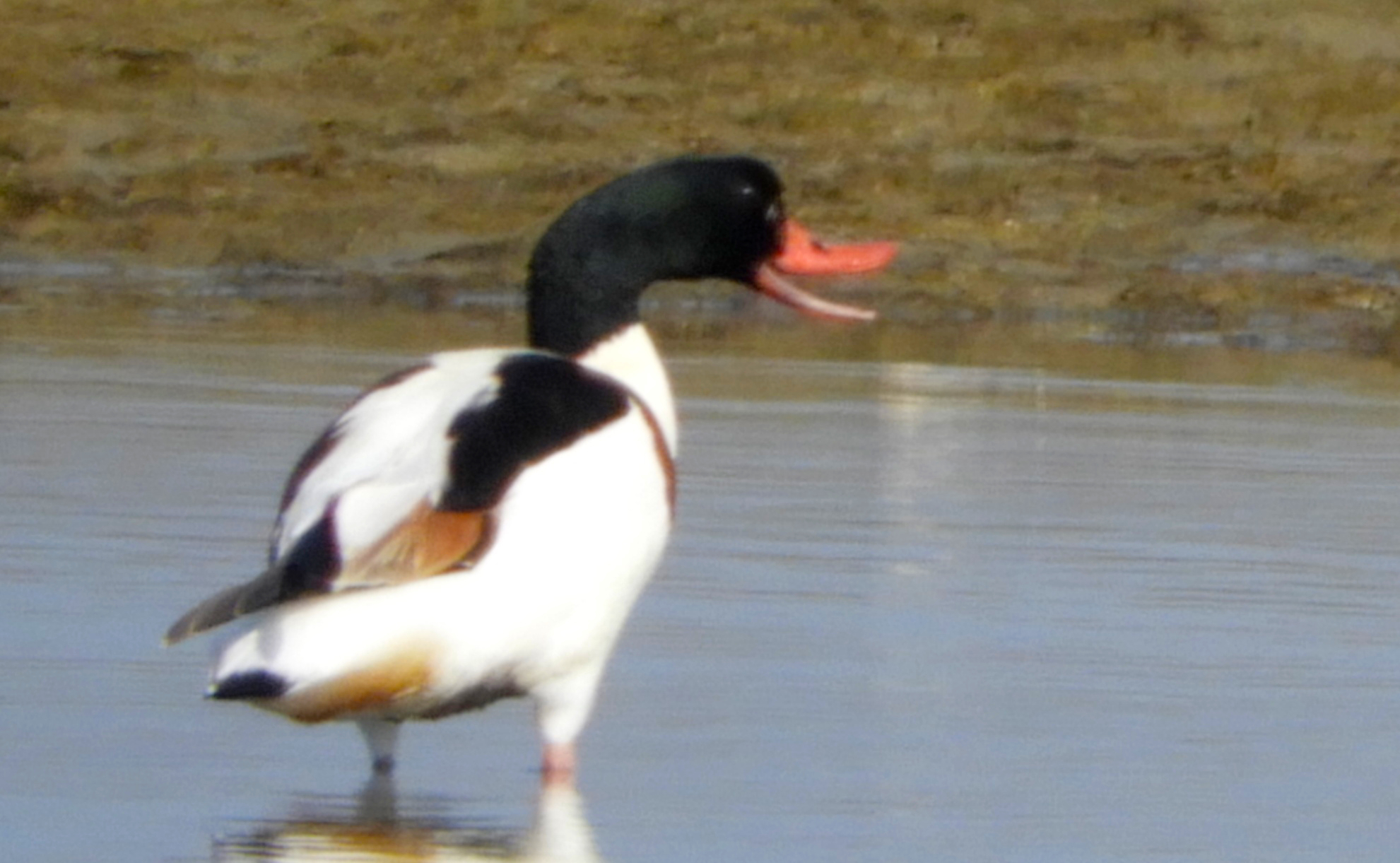
Common shelduck

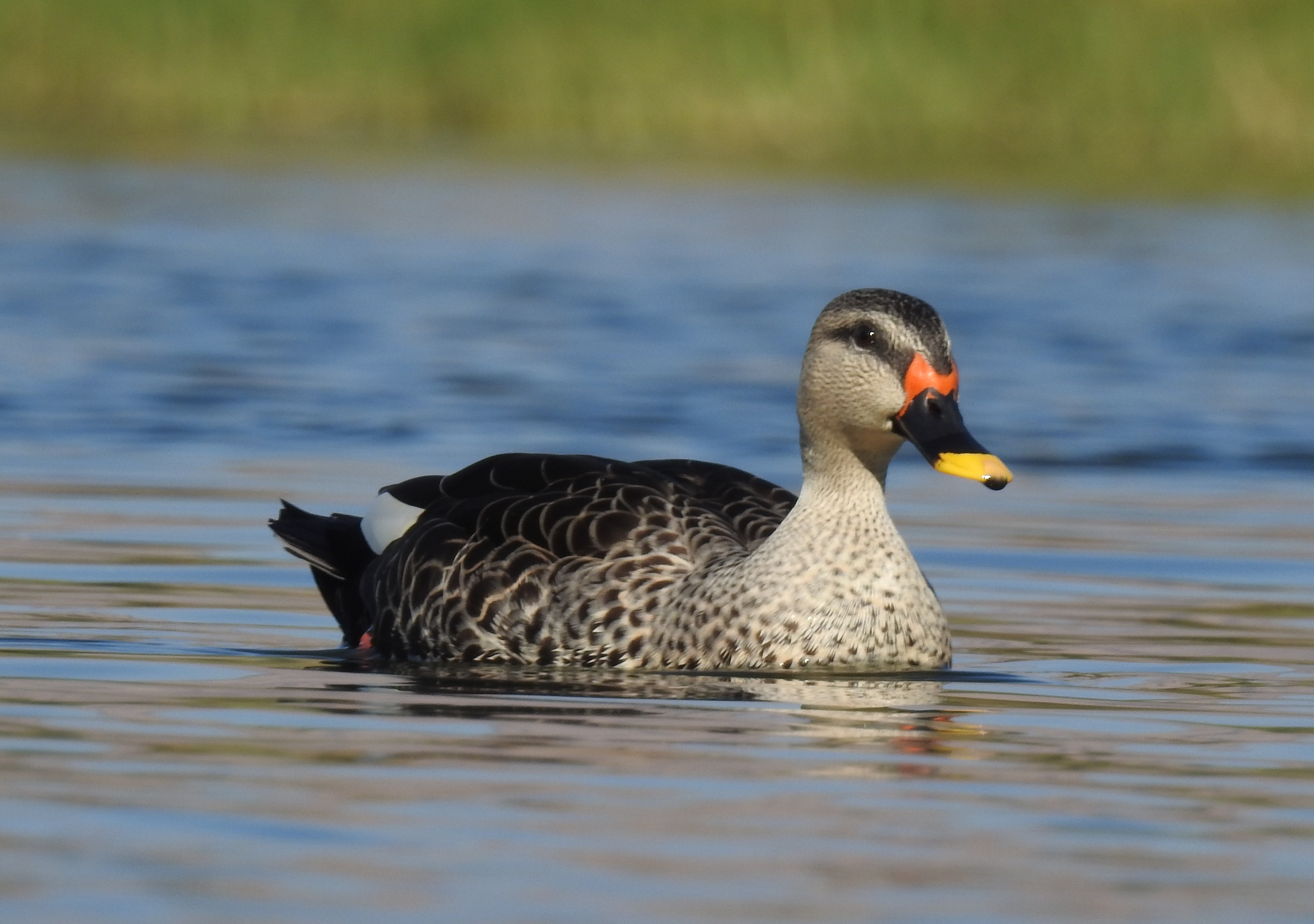
Indian spot-billed duck

Common name	Binomial	Comments
Fulvous whistling duck	Dendrocygna bicolor	
Lesser whistling duck	Dendrocygna javanica	
Red-breasted goose	Branta ruficollis	(V); vulnerable
Barnacle goose	Branta leucopsis	
Bar-headed goose	Anser indicus	
Greylag goose	Anser anser	
Taiga bean goose	Anser fabalis	(V)
Tundra bean goose	Anser serrirostris	(V); by some authorities considered a variety of Anser fabalis
Greater white-fronted goose	Anser albifrons	
Lesser white-fronted goose	Anser erythropus	(V); vulnerable
Mute swan	Cygnus olor	(V)
Tundra swan	Cygnus columbianus	(V); race bewickii sometimes treated as a species
Whooper swan	Cygnus cygnus	(V)
Knob-billed duck	Sarkidiornis melanotos	
Common shelduck	Tadorna tadorna	
Ruddy shelduck	Tadorna ferruginea	
White-winged duck	Asarcornis scutulata	Critically endangered
Mandarin duck	Aix galericulata	(V)
Cotton pygmy goose	Nettapus coromandelianus	
Baikal teal	Sibirionetta formosa	(V)
Garganey	Spatula querquedula	
Northern shoveler	Spatula clypeata	
Gadwall	Mareca strepera	
Falcated duck	Mareca falcata	
Eurasian wigeon	Mareca penelope	
Indian spot-billed duck	Anas poecilorhyncha	
Eastern spot-billed duck	Anas zonorhyncha	(V)
Mallard	Anas platyrhynchos	
Northern pintail	Anas acuta	
Eurasian teal	Anas crecca	
Andaman teal	Anas albogularis	(E); near threatened
Marbled duck	Marmaronetta angustirostris	Near threatened
Pink-headed duck	Rhodonessa caryophyllacea	(E); critically endangered (possibly extinct)
Red-crested pochard	Netta rufina	
Common pochard	Aythya ferina	Vulnerable
Baer's pochard	Aythya baeri	Critically endangered
Ferruginous duck	Aythya nyroca	Near threatened
Tufted duck	Aythya fuligula	
Greater scaup	Aythya marila	
Long-tailed duck	Clangula hyemalis	(V); vulnerable
Common goldeneye	Bucephala clangula	
Smew	Mergellus albellus	
Common merganser	Mergus merganser	
Red-breasted merganser	Mergus serrator	(V)
White-headed duck	Oxyura leucocephala	Endangered

== Megapodes ==
Order: Galliformes Family: Megapodiidae

The Megapodiidae are stocky, medium-large chicken-like birds with small heads and large feet. All but the malleefowl occupy jungle habitats and most have brown or black colouring. There is one species within India.

Common name	Binomial	Status
Nicobar megapode	Megapodius nicobariensis	(E); vulnerable

== Pheasants and allies ==
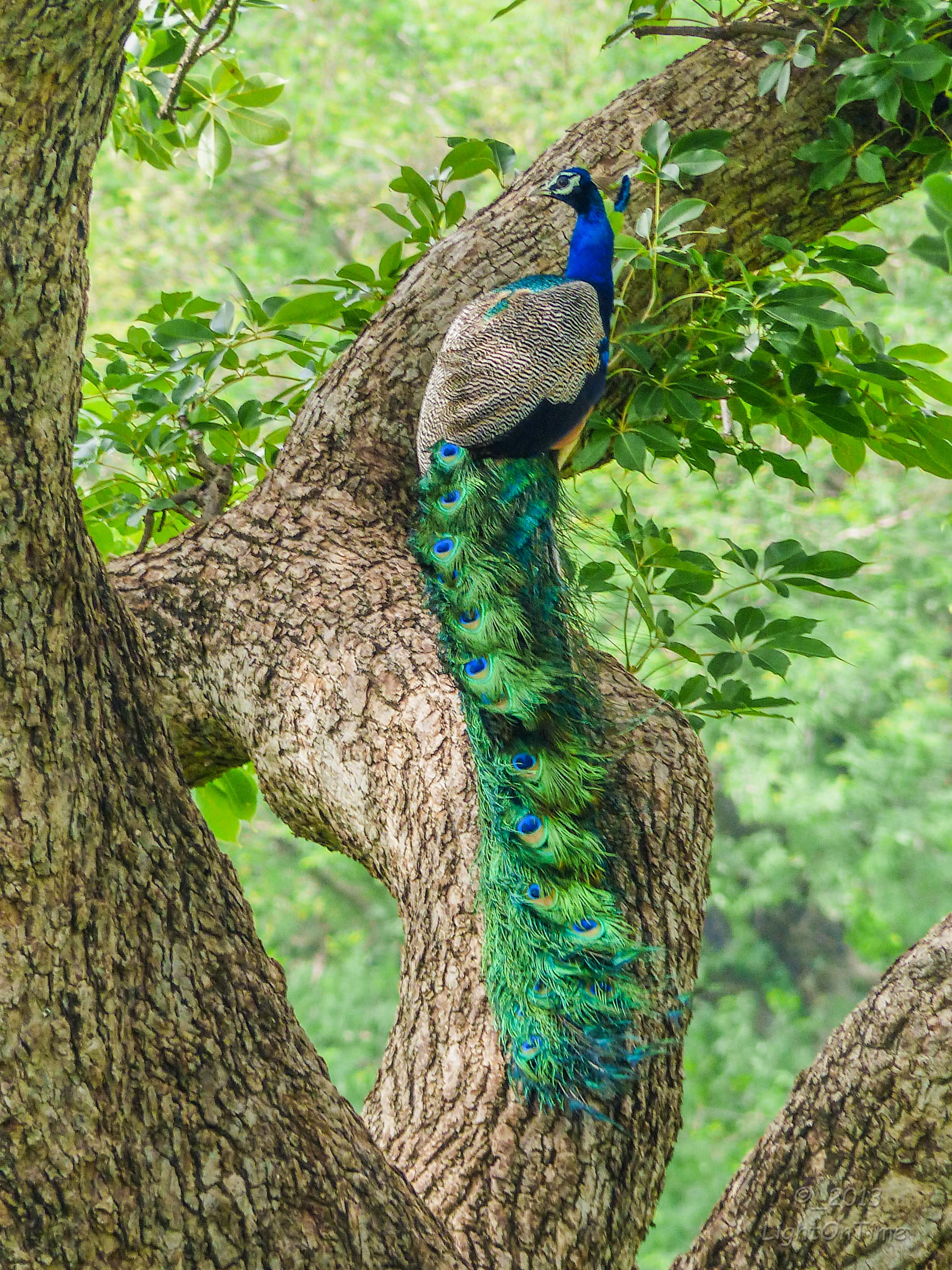
Indian peafowl

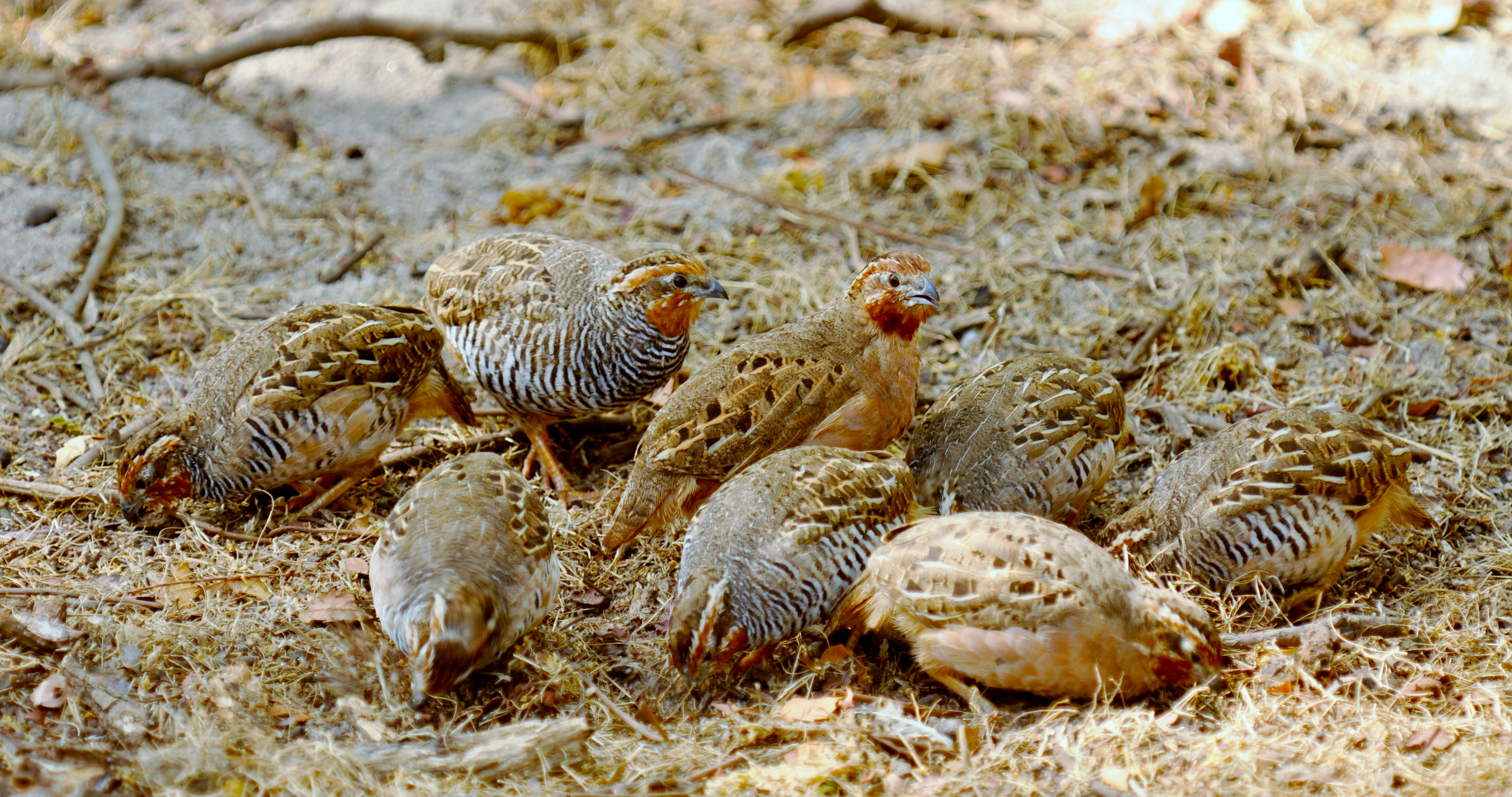
A covey of jungle bush-quail

Order: Galliformes Family: Phasianidae

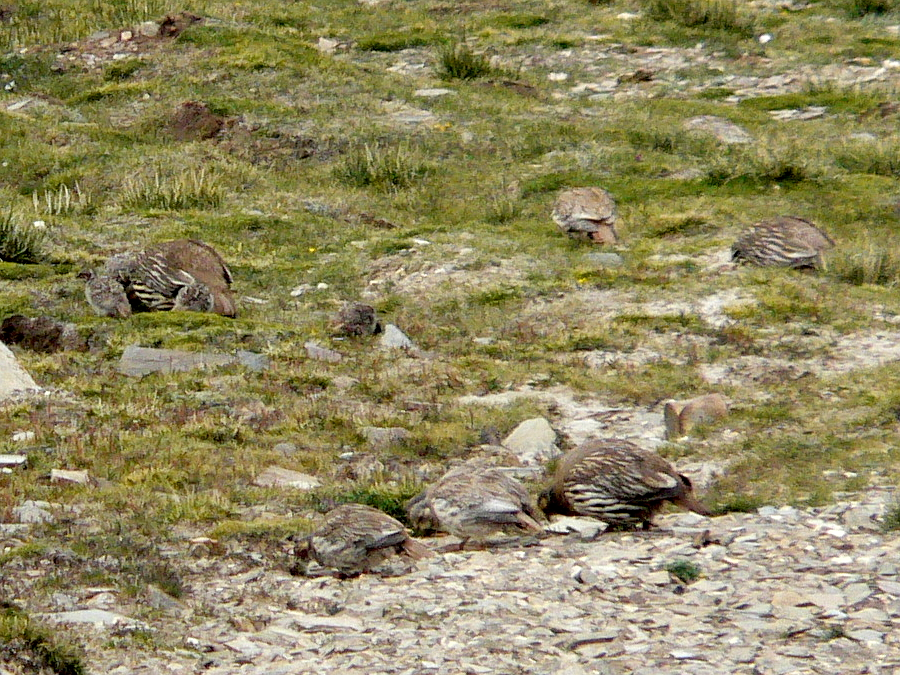
Tibetan snowcock flock

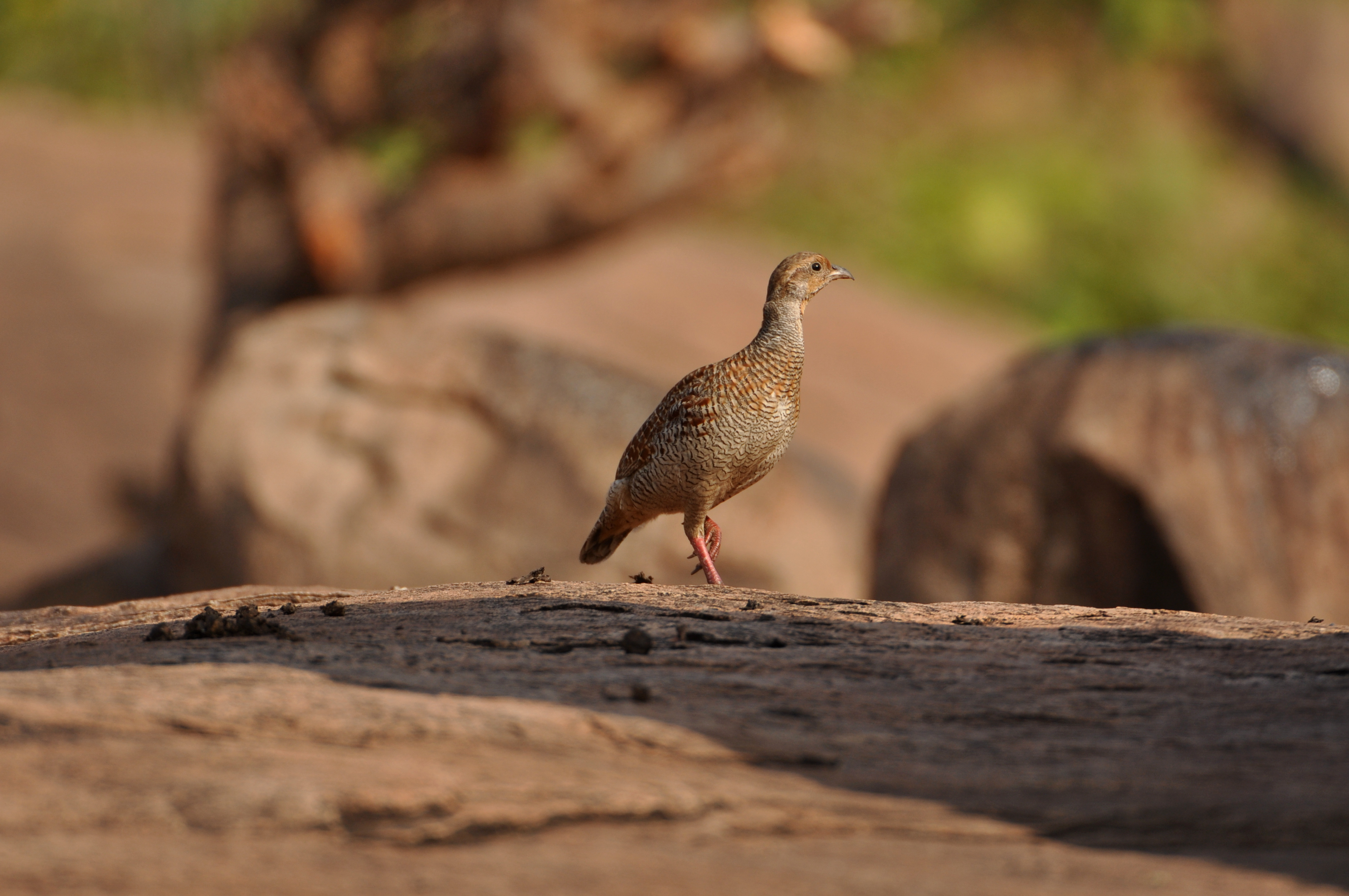
Grey francolin

The Phasianidae are a family of terrestrial birds which consists of quail, partridges, snowcocks, francolins, spurfowl, tragopans, monals, pheasants, peafowl and jungle fowl. In general, they are plump (although they vary in size) and have broad, relatively short wings.

Common name	Binomial	Comments
Snow partridge	Lerwa lerwa	
Himalayan snowcock	Tetraogallus himalayensis	
Tibetan snowcock	Tetraogallus tibetanus	
Chukar partridge	Alectoris chukar	
Black francolin	Francolinus francolinus	
Painted francolin	Francolinus pictus	
Chinese francolin	Francolinus pintadeanus	
Grey francolin	Ortygornis pondicerianus	
Swamp francolin	Ortygornis gularis	Near threatened
Tibetan partridge	Perdix hodgsoniae	
Common quail	Coturnix coturnix	
Japanese quail	Coturnix japonica	Near threatened
Rain quail	Coturnix coromandelica	
King quail	Synoicus chinensis	
Jungle bush quail	Perdicula asiatica	
Rock bush quail	Perdicula argoondah	(E)
Painted bush quail	Perdicula erythrorhyncha	(E)
Manipur bush quail	Perdicula manipurensis	(E); endangered
Himalayan quail	Ophrysia superciliosa	(E); critically endangered (possibly extinct)
Hill partridge	Arborophila torqueola	
Rufous-throated partridge	Arborophila rufogularis	
White-cheeked partridge	Arborophila atrogularis	
Chestnut-breasted partridge	Arborophila mandellii	Near threatened
Mountain bamboo partridge	Bambusicola fytchii	
Red spurfowl	Galloperdix spadicea	(E)
Painted spurfowl	Galloperdix lunulata	(E)
Blood pheasant	Ithaginis cruentus	
Western tragopan	Tragopan melanocephalus	Vulnerable
Satyr tragopan	Tragopan satyra	
Blyth's tragopan	Tragopan blythii	Vulnerable
Temminck's tragopan	Tragopan temminckii	
Koklass pheasant	Pucrasia macrolopha	
Himalayan monal	Lophophorus impejanus	
Sclater's monal	Lophophorus sclateri	
Red junglefowl	Gallus gallus	
Grey junglefowl	Gallus sonneratii	(E)
Kalij pheasant	Lophura leucomelanos	
Cheer pheasant	Catreus wallichii	Vulnerable
Mrs. Hume's pheasant	Syrmaticus humiae	Vulnerable
Tibetan eared pheasant	Crossoptilon harmani	
Grey peacock-pheasant	Polyplectron bicalcaratum	
Indian peafowl	Pavo cristatus	
Green peafowl	Pavo muticus	(Ex); endangered

== Frogmouths ==
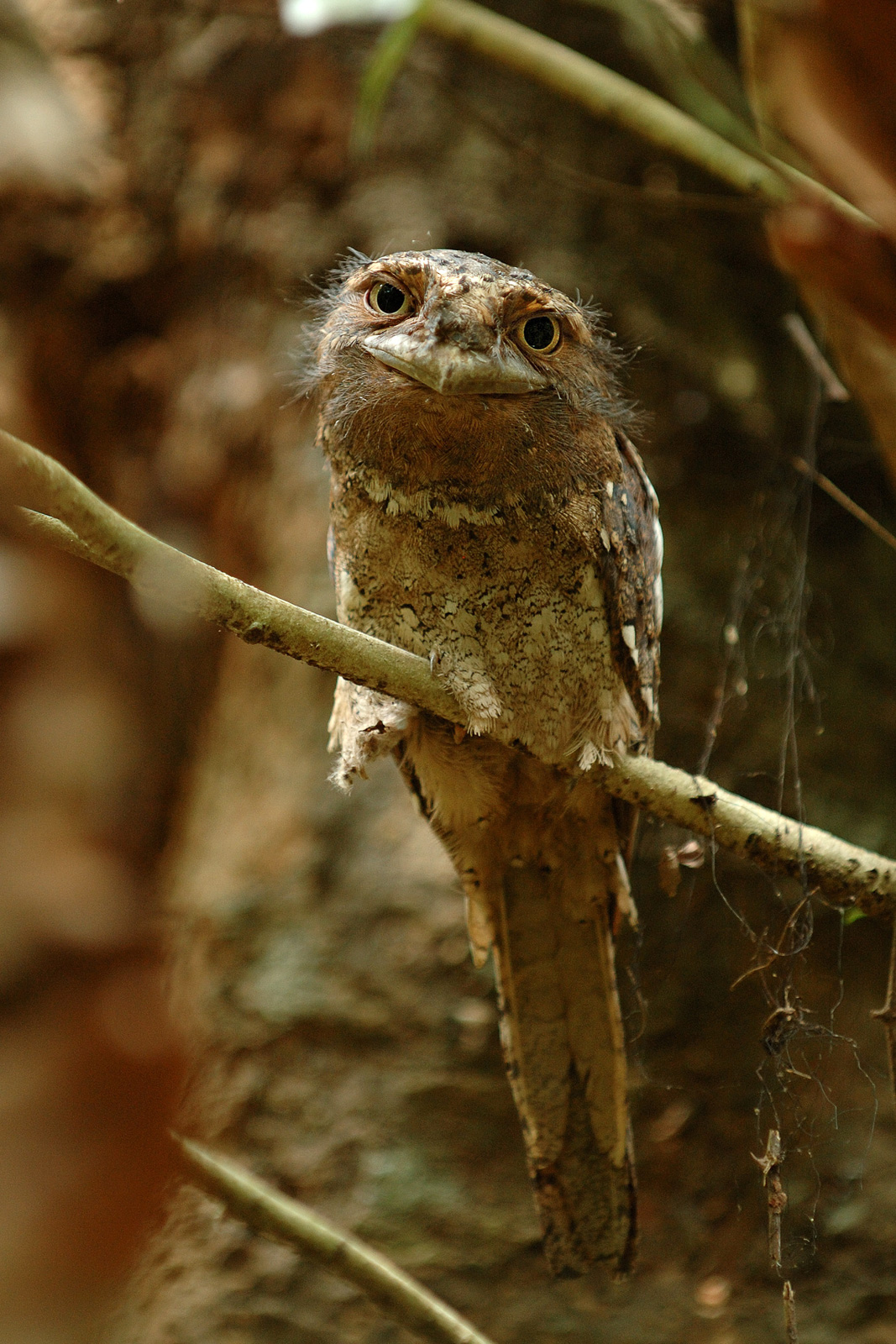
Sri Lanka frogmouth

Order: Podargiformes Family: Podargidae

The frogmouths are a group of nocturnal birds related to the nightjars. They are named for their large flattened hooked bill and huge frog-like gape, which they use to take insects. There are two species which have been recorded in India.

Common name	Binomial	Comments
Sri Lanka frogmouth	Batrachostomus moniliger	ssp. roonwali in India
Hodgson's frogmouth	Batrachostomus hodgsoni	

== Nightjars ==
Order: Caprimulgiformes Family: Caprimulgidae

Nightjars are medium-sized nocturnal birds that usually nest on the ground. They have long wings, short legs and very short bills. Most have small feet, of little use for walking, and long pointed wings. Their soft plumage is camouflaged to resemble bark or leaves.

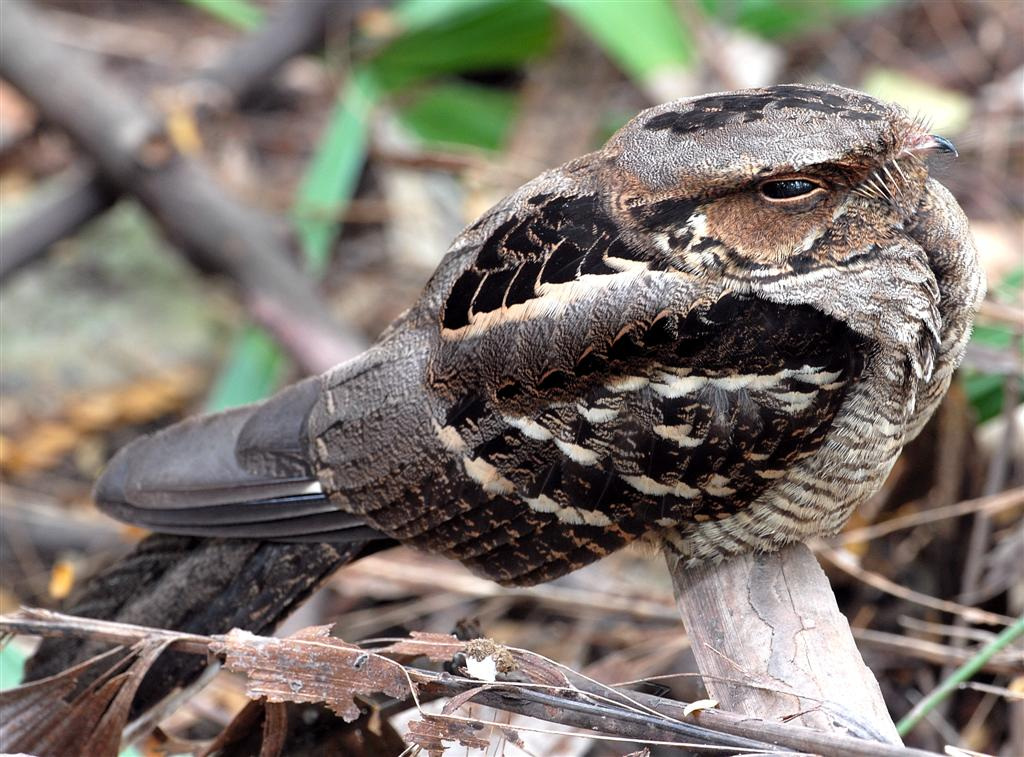
Large-tailed nightjar

Common name	Binomial	Comments
Great eared nightjar	Lyncornis macrotis	
Jungle nightjar	Caprimulgus indicus	
Grey nightjar	Caprimulgus jotaka	
European nightjar	Caprimulgus europaeus	
Sykes's nightjar	Caprimulgus mahrattensis	
Jerdon's nightjar	Caprimulgus atripennis	
Large-tailed nightjar	Caprimulgus macrurus	
Andaman nightjar	Caprimulgus andamanicus	(E)
Indian nightjar	Caprimulgus asiaticus	
Savanna nightjar	Caprimulgus affinis	

== Treeswifts ==
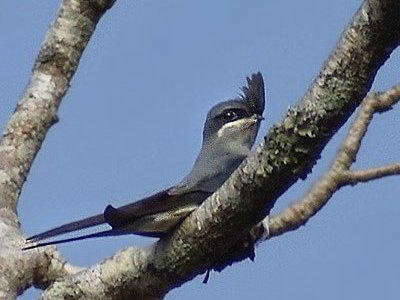
Crested treeswift

Order: Apodiformes Family: Hemiprocnidae

The treeswifts, or crested swifts, are closely related to the true swifts. They differ from the other swifts in that they have crests, long forked tails and softer plumage. There is one species which occurs in India.

Common name	Binomial	Comments
Crested treeswift	Hemiprocne coronata	

== Swifts ==
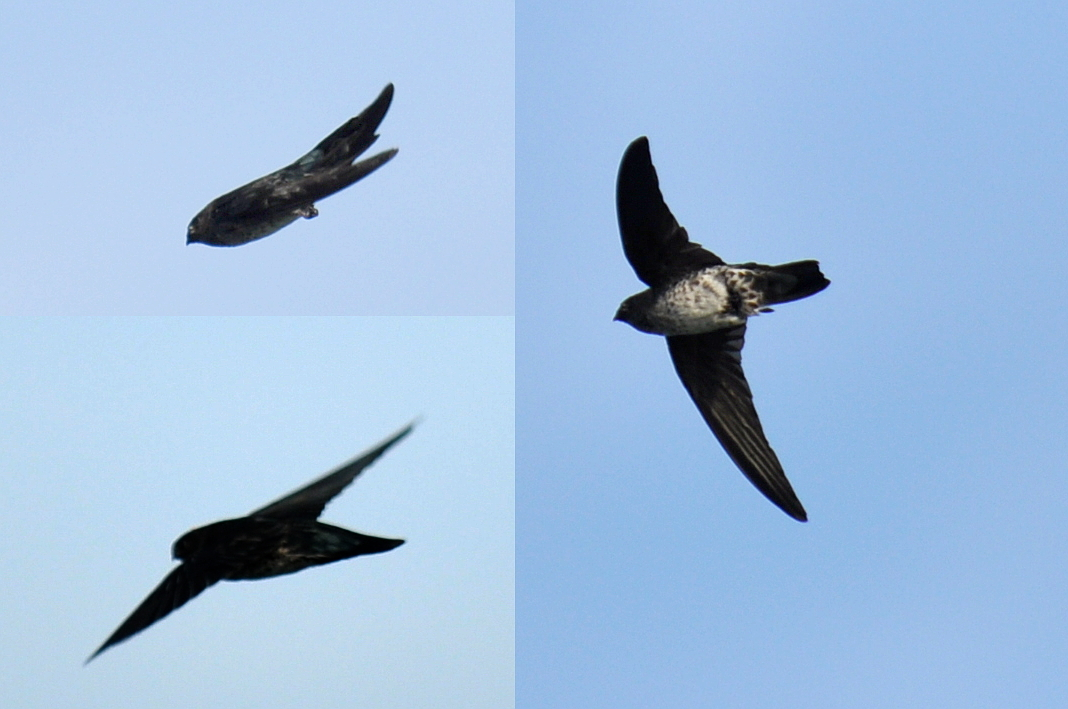
Glossy swiftlet

Order: Apodiformes Family: Apodidae

Swifts are small birds which spend the majority of their lives flying. These birds have very short legs and never settle voluntarily on the ground, perching instead only on vertical surfaces. Many swifts have long swept-back wings which resemble a crescent or boomerang. There are 17 species which have been recorded in India.

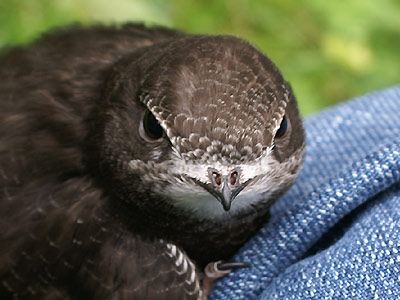
Young common swift

Common name	Binomial	Comments
Plume-toed swiftlet	Collocalia affinis	
Indian swiftlet	Aerodramus unicolor	
Himalayan swiftlet	Aerodramus brevirostris	
Edible-nest swiftlet	Aerodramus fuciphagus	
White-rumped spinetail	Zoonavena sylvatica	
White-throated needletail	Hirundapus caudacutus	
Silver-backed needletail	Hirundapus cochinchinensis	
Brown-backed needletail	Hirundapus giganteus	
Asian palm swift	Cypsiurus balasiensis	
Alpine swift	Tachymarptis melba	
Common swift	Apus apus	
Pallid swift	Apus pallidus	(V)
Pacific swift	Apus pacificus ssp. kurodae	
Blyth's swift	Apus leuconyx	
Dark-rumped swift	Apus acuticauda	Near threatened
Little swift	Apus affinis	
House swift	Apus nipalensis	

== Bustards ==
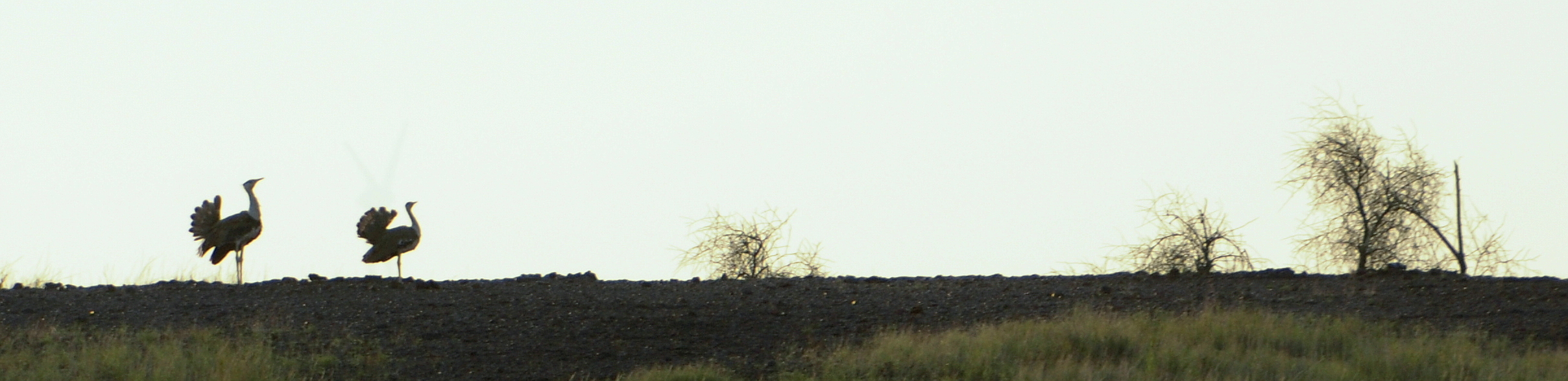
Great Indian bustard courting pair

Order: Otidiformes Family: Otididae

Bustards are large terrestrial birds mainly associated with dry open country and steppes in the Old World. They are omnivorous and nest on the ground. They walk steadily on strong legs and big toes, pecking for food as they go. They have long broad wings with "fingered" wingtips and striking patterns in flight. Many have interesting mating displays.

Common name	Binomial	Comments
Great Indian bustard	Ardeotis nigriceps	(E); critically endangered
Asian houbara	Chlamydotis macqueenii	Vulnerable; earlier as subspecies of houbara bustard, Chlamydotis undulata
Bengal florican	Houbaropsis bengalensis	Critically endangered
Lesser florican	Sypheotides indicus	Critically endangered
Little bustard	Tetrax tetrax	(V); near threatened

== Cuckoos ==
Order: Cuculiformes Family: Cuculidae

The family Cuculidae includes cuckoos, roadrunners and anis. These birds are of variable size with slender bodies, long tails and strong legs. Many are brood parasites. There are 24 species which have been recorded in India.

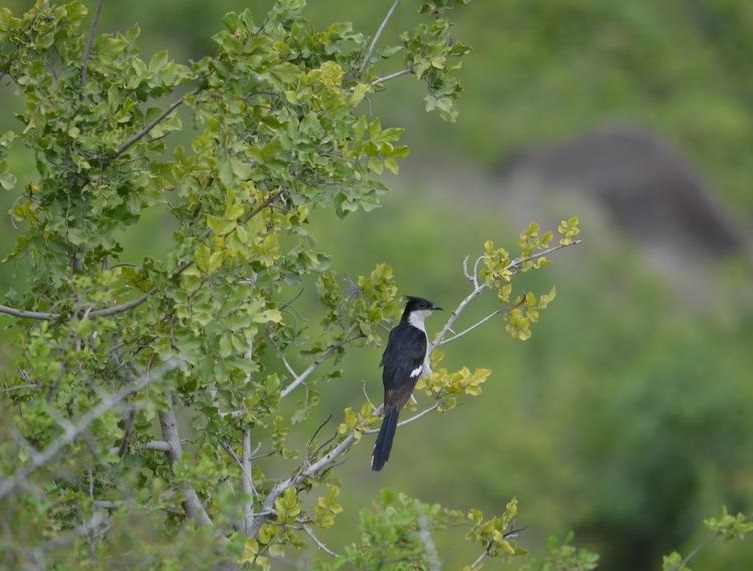
Jacobin cuckoo in Pune, Maharashtra

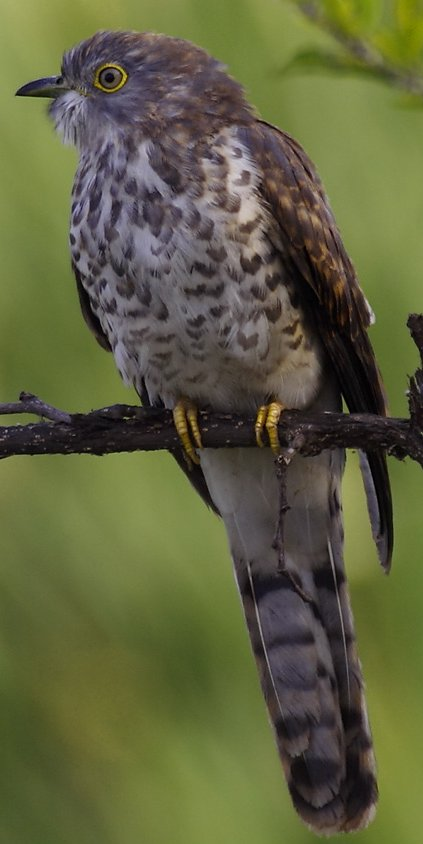
Common hawk-cuckoo

Common name	Binomial	Comments
Greater coucal	Centropus sinensis	
Lesser coucal	Centropus bengalensis	
Andaman coucal	Centropus andamanensis	
Sirkeer malkoha	Taccocua leschenaultii	
Blue-faced malkoha	Phaenicophaeus viridirostris	
Green-billed malkoha	Phaenicophaeus tristis	
Chestnut-winged cuckoo	Clamator coromandus	
Jacobin cuckoo	Clamator jacobinus	
Asian koel	Eudynamys scolopaceus	
Asian emerald cuckoo	Chrysococcyx maculatus	
Violet cuckoo	Chrysococcyx xanthorhynchus	
Horsfield's bronze cuckoo	Chrysococcyx basalis	(V)
Banded bay cuckoo	Cacomantis sonneratii	
Plaintive cuckoo	Cacomantis merulinus	
Grey-bellied cuckoo	Cacomantis passerinus	
Square-tailed drongo-cuckoo	Surniculus lugubris	
Fork-tailed drongo-cuckoo	Surniculus dicruroides	
Large hawk-cuckoo	Hierococcyx sparverioides	
Common hawk-cuckoo	Hierococcyx varius	
Hodgson's hawk-cuckoo	Hierococcyx nisicolor	
Lesser cuckoo	Cuculus poliocephalus	
Indian cuckoo	Cuculus micropterus	
Himalayan cuckoo	Cuculus saturatus	
Common cuckoo	Cuculus canorus	

== Sandgrouse ==
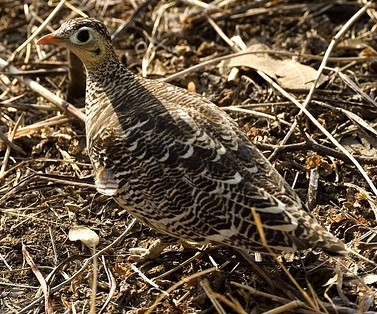
Painted sandgrouse

Order: Pterocliformes Family: Pteroclidae

Sandgrouse have small, pigeon like heads and necks, but sturdy compact bodies. They have long pointed wings and sometimes tails and a fast direct flight. Flocks fly to watering holes at dawn and dusk. Their legs are feathered down to the toes. There are seven species which have been recorded in India. India has the largest number of sandgrouse of any country.

Common name	Binomial	Comments
Tibetan sandgrouse	Syrrhaptes tibetanus	
Pallas's sandgrouse	Syrrhaptes paradoxus	(V)
Pin-tailed sandgrouse	Pterocles alchata	(V)
Chestnut-bellied sandgrouse	Pterocles exustus	
Spotted sandgrouse	Pterocles senegallus	
Black-bellied sandgrouse	Pterocles orientalis	
Painted sandgrouse	Pterocles indicus	

== Pigeons and doves ==
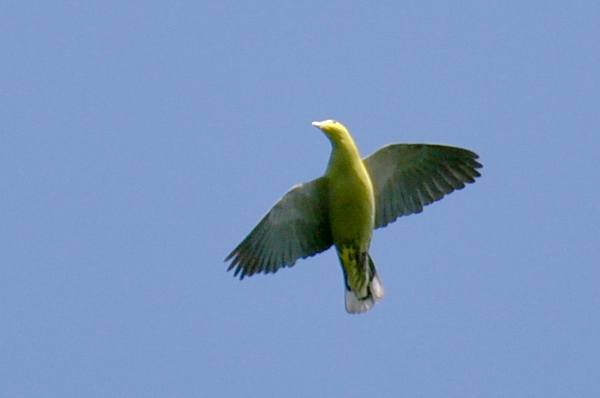
Andaman green pigeon

Order: Columbiformes Family: Columbidae

Pigeons and doves are stout-bodied birds with short necks and short slender bills with a fleshy cere. There are 34 species found in India

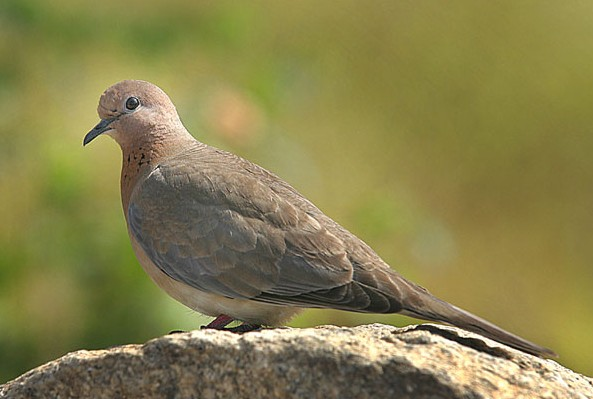
Laughing dove

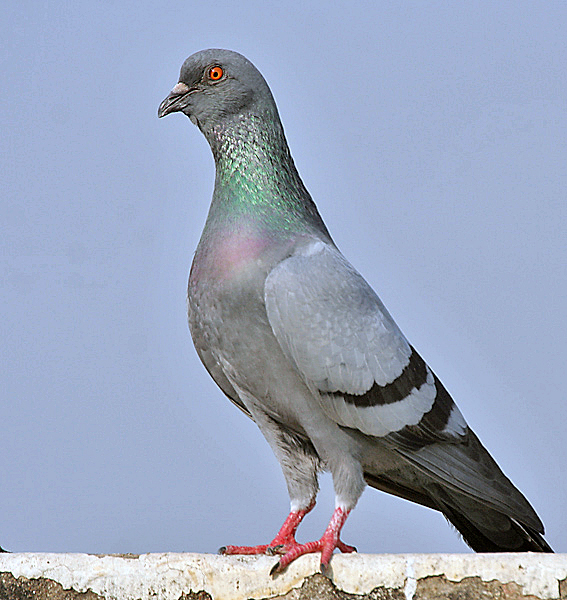
Rock pigeon

Common name	Binomial	Comments
Rock dove	Columba livia	
Hill pigeon	Columba rupestris	
Snow pigeon	Columba leuconota	
Yellow-eyed pigeon	Columba eversmanni	vulnerable
Common wood pigeon	Columba palumbus	
Speckled wood pigeon	Columba hodgsonii	
Ashy wood pigeon	Columba pulchricollis	
Nilgiri wood pigeon	Columba elphinstonii	(E); vulnerable
Pale-capped pigeon	Columba punicea	Vulnerable
Andaman wood pigeon	Columba palumboides	(E); near threatened
European turtle dove	Streptopelia turtur	(V); vulnerable
Oriental turtle dove	Streptopelia orientalis	
Eurasian collared dove	Streptopelia decaocto	
Red collared dove	Streptopelia tranquebarica	
Spotted dove	Spilopelia chinensis	
Laughing dove	Spilopelia senegalensis	
Barred cuckoo-dove	Macropygia unchall	
Andaman cuckoo-dove	Macropygia rufipennis	(E)
Namaqua dove	Oena capensis	(V)
Common emerald dove	Chalcophaps indica	
Nicobar pigeon	Caloenas nicobarica	Near threatened
Orange-breasted green pigeon	Treron bicinctus	
Grey-fronted green pigeon	Treron affinis	(E)
Ashy-headed green pigeon	Treron phayrei	Near threatened
Andaman green pigeon	Treron chloropterus	(E); near threatened
Thick-billed green pigeon	Treron curvirostra	
Yellow-footed green pigeon	Treron phoenicopterus	
Pin-tailed green pigeon	Treron apicauda	
Wedge-tailed green pigeon	Treron sphenurus	
Green imperial pigeon	Ducula aenea	Near threatened
Nicobar imperial pigeon	Ducula nicobarica	(E); near threatened
Mountain imperial pigeon	Ducula badia	
Malabar imperial pigeon	Ducula cuprea	(E)
Pied imperial pigeon	Ducula bicolor	

== Finfoots ==
Order: Gruiformes Family: Heliornithidae

Heliornithidae is a small family of tropical birds with webbed lobes on their feet similar to those of grebes and coots. There is one species which occurs in India.

Common name	Binomial	Comments
Masked finfoot	Heliopais personatus	Critically endangered

== Rails, crakes, and coots ==
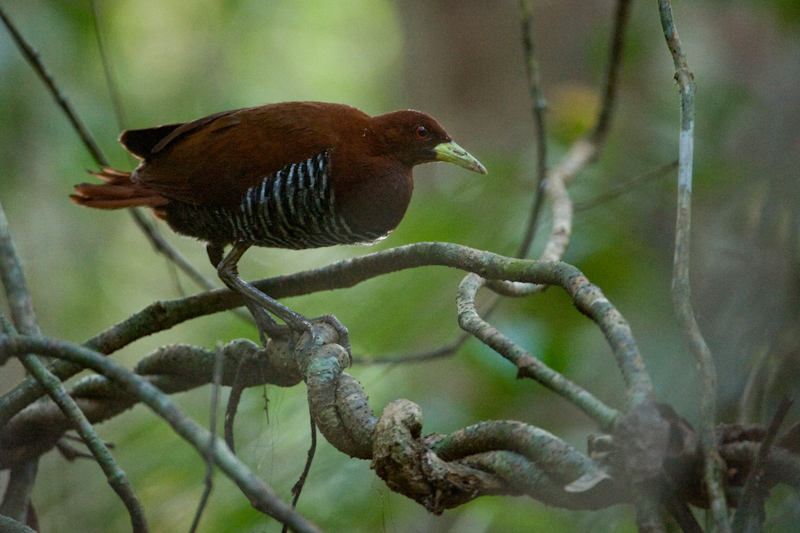
Andaman crake

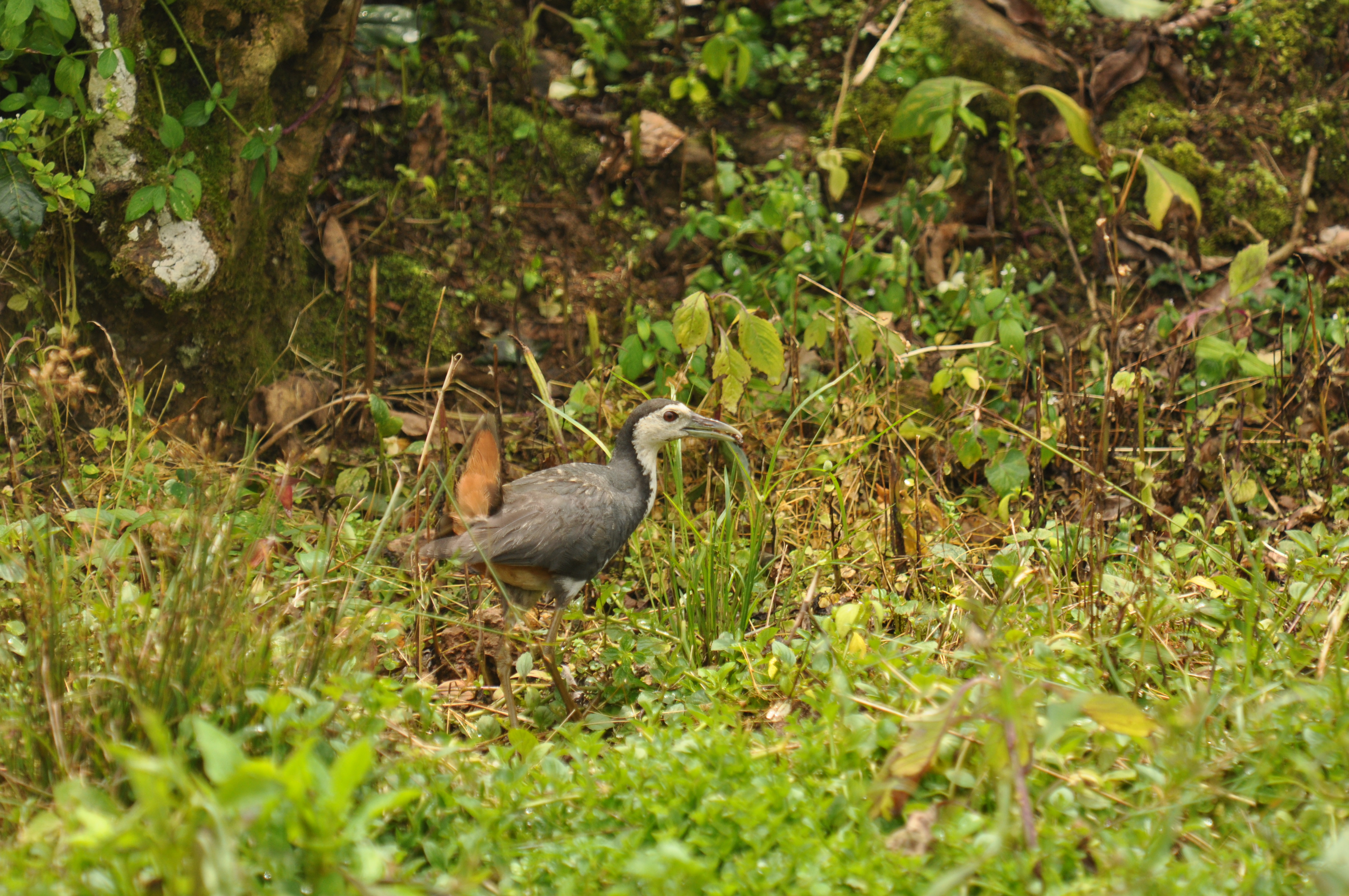
White-breasted waterhen

Order: Gruiformes Family: Rallidae

Rallidae is a large family of small to medium-sized birds which includes the rails, crakes, coots and gallinules. Typically they inhabit dense vegetation in damp environments near lakes, swamps or rivers. In general they are shy and secretive birds, making them difficult to observe, though some are bold and conspicuous. Most species have strong legs and long toes which are well adapted to soft uneven surfaces. They tend to have short, rounded wings and to be weak fliers. There are 20 species found in India.

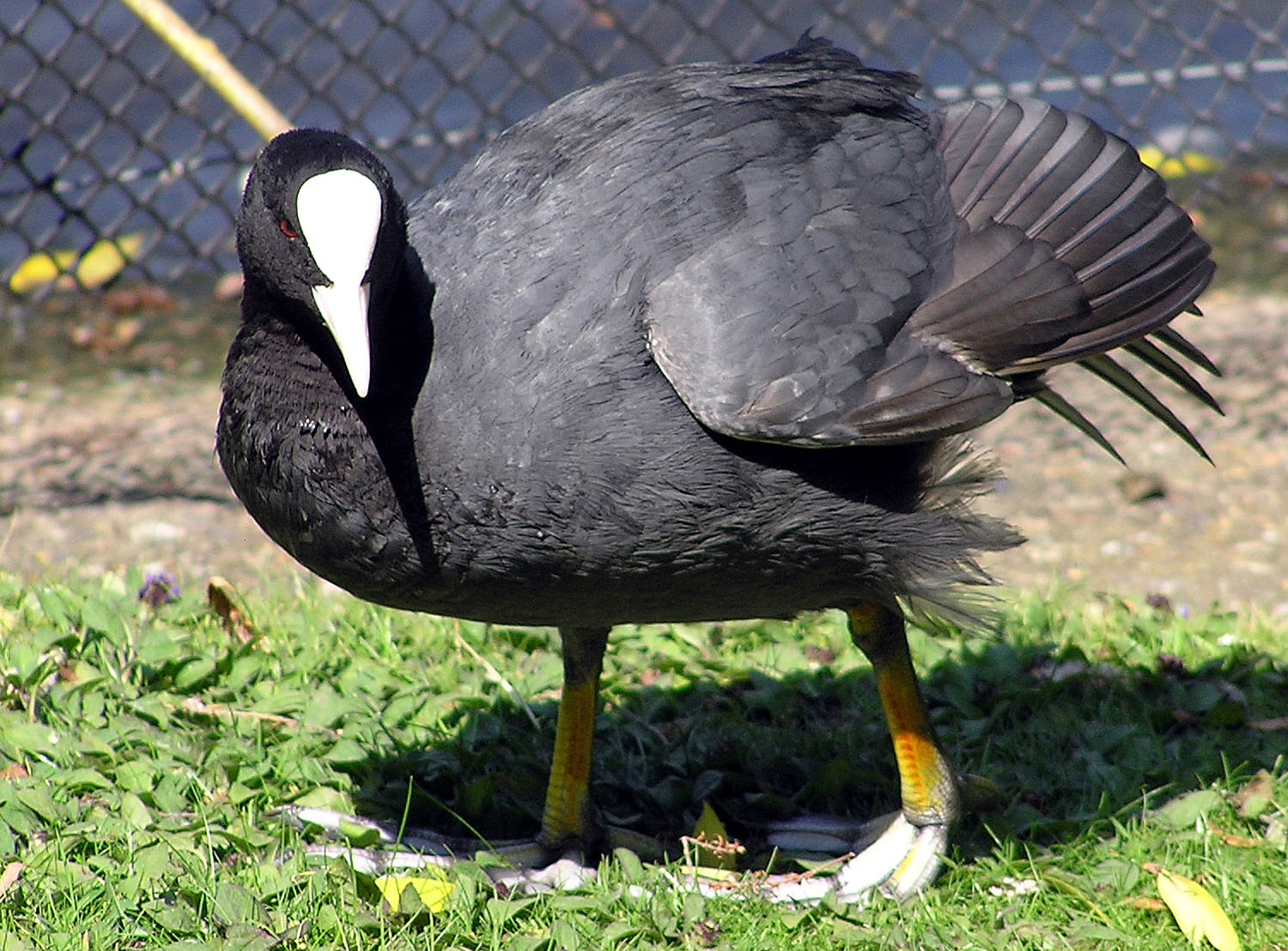
Eurasian coot

Common name	Binomial	Comments
Water rail	Rallus aquaticus	
Brown-cheeked rail	Rallus indicus	
Corn crake	Crex crex	(V)
Slaty-breasted rail	Lewinia striata	
Spotted crake	Porzana porzana	
Common moorhen	Gallinula chloropus	
Eurasian coot	Fulica atra	
Grey-headed swamphen	Porphyrio poliocephalus	
Ruddy-breasted crake	Zapornia fusca	
Band-bellied crake	Zapornia paykullii	(V); near threatened
Black-tailed crake	Zapornia bicolor	
Brown crake	Zapornia akool	
Baillon's crake	Zapornia pusilla	
Little crake	Zapornia parva	(V)
Slaty-legged crake	Rallina eurizonoides	
Andaman crake	Rallina canningi	(E)
Red-legged crake	Rallina fasciata	(V)
White-browed crake	Poliolimnas cinereus	(V)
Watercock	Gallicrex cinerea	
White-breasted waterhen	Amaurornis phoenicurus	

== Cranes ==
Order: Gruiformes Family: Gruidae

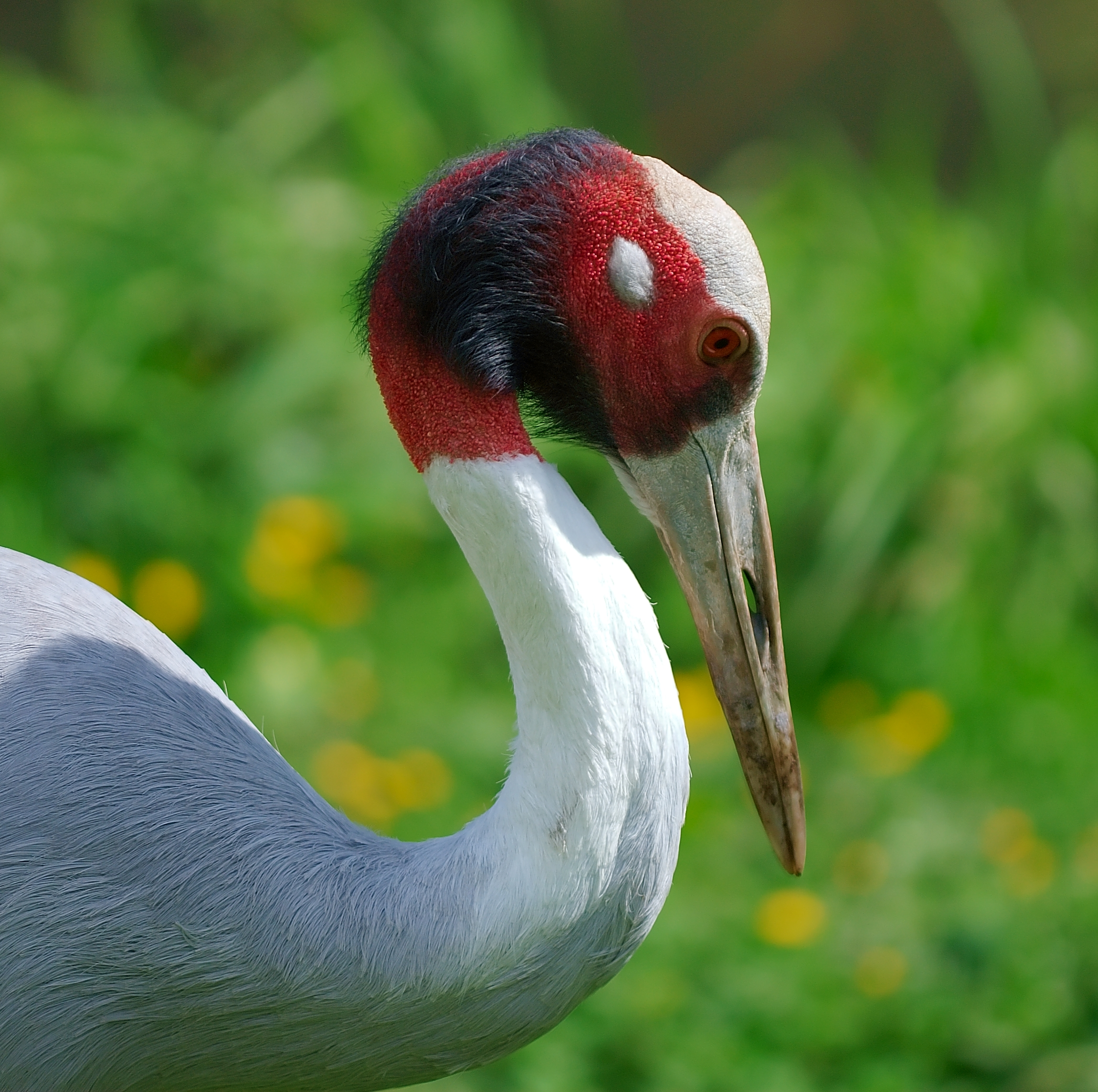
Sarus crane

Cranes are large, long-legged and long-necked birds. Unlike the similar-looking but unrelated herons, cranes fly with necks outstretched, not pulled back. Most have elaborate and noisy courting displays or "dances". There are five species which have been recorded in India.

Common name	Binomial	Comments
Siberian crane	Leucogeranus leucogeranus	Critically endangered, and now extinct in India; last known wintering in India in 2002
Sarus crane	Antigone antigone	Vulnerable
Demoiselle crane	Grus virgo	
Common crane	Grus grus	
Black-necked crane	Grus nigricollis	Near threatened

The hooded crane, Grus monacha, was included in many older lists but is considered hypothetical (Rasmussen and Anderton, 2005) or extinct in India by more recent works.

== Grebes ==
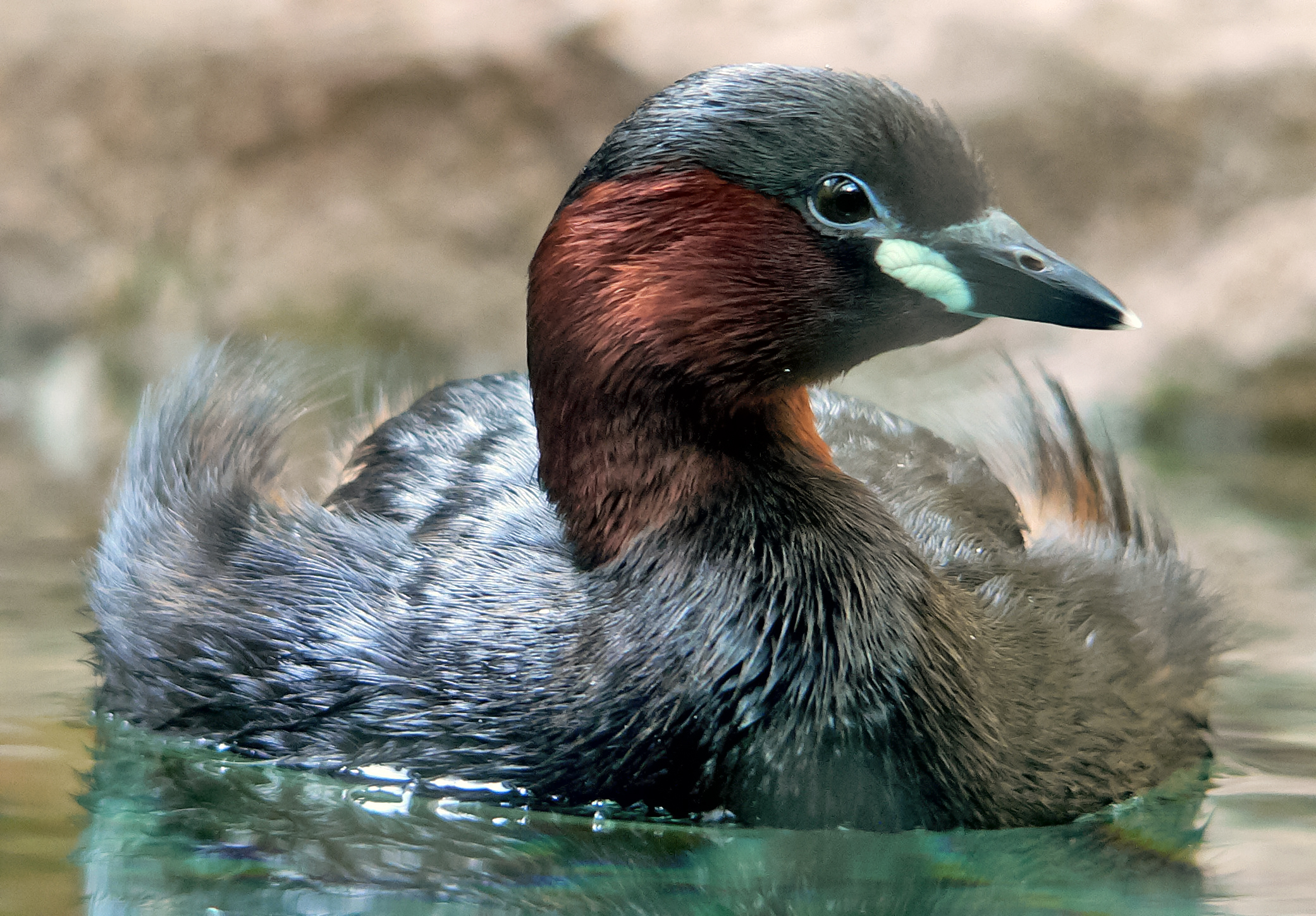
Little grebe

Order: Podicipediformes Family: Podicipedidae

Grebes are small to medium-large freshwater diving birds. They have lobed toes and are excellent swimmers and divers. However, they have their feet placed far back on the body, making them quite ungainly on land. There are five species which have been recorded in India.

Common name	Binomial	Comments
Little grebe	Tachybaptus ruficollis	
Red-necked grebe	Podiceps grisegena	(V)
Great crested grebe	Podiceps cristatus	
Horned grebe	Podiceps auritus	(V); vulnerable
Black-necked grebe	Podiceps nigricollis	

== Flamingos ==
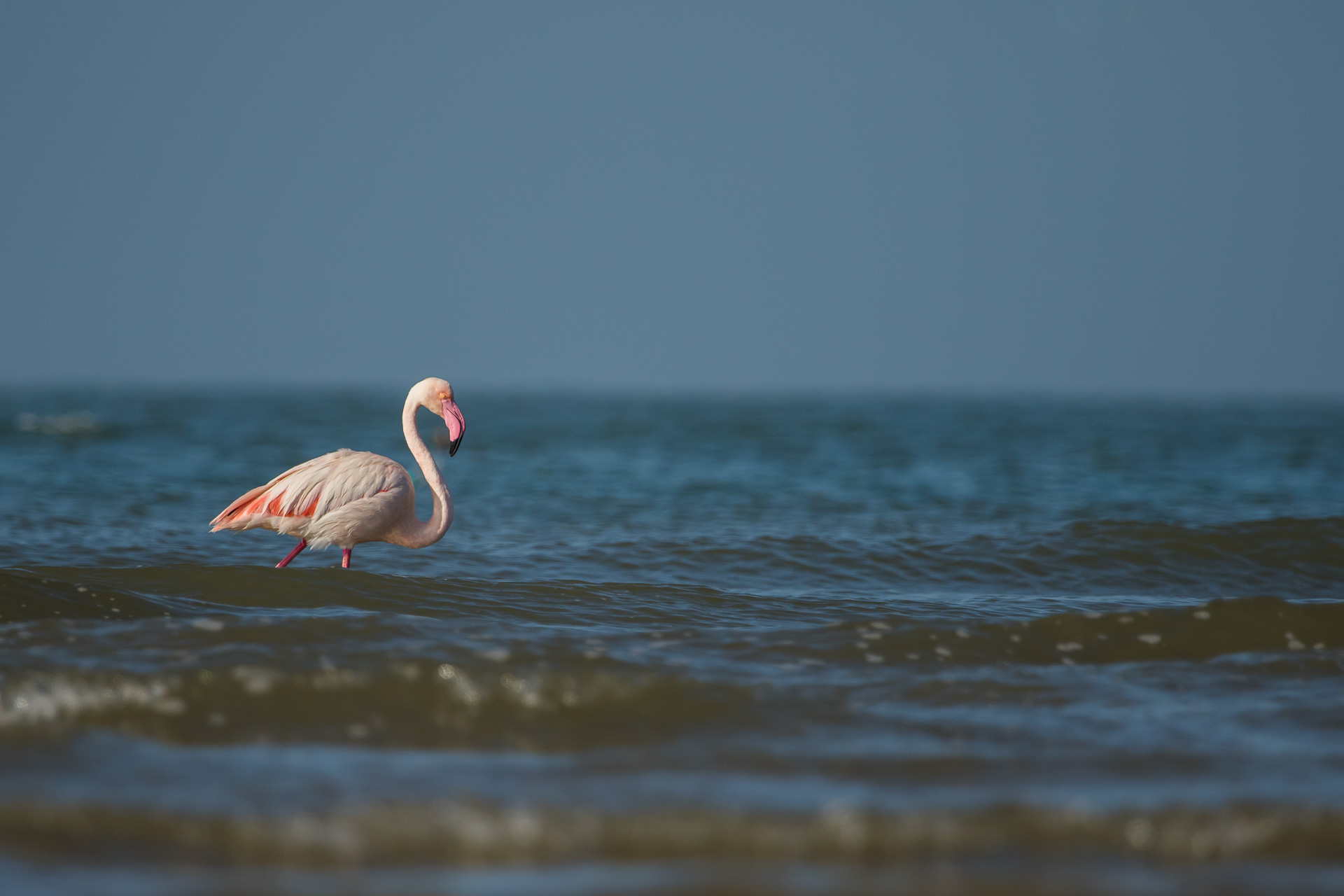
Greater flamingo

Order: Phoenicopteriformes Family: Phoenicopteridae

Flamingos are gregarious wading birds, usually 1 to 1.5 metres (3 to 5 ft) tall, found in both the Western and Eastern Hemispheres. Flamingos filter-feed on shellfish and algae. Their oddly shaped beaks are specially adapted to separate mud and silt from the food they consume and, uniquely, are used upside-down. There are two species which have been recorded in India.

Common name	Binomial	Comments
Greater flamingo	Phoenicopterus roseus	
Lesser flamingo	Phoeniconaias minor	Near threatened

== Buttonquails ==
Order: Charadriiformes Family: Turnicidae

The buttonquails are small, drab, running birds which resemble the true quails. The female is the brighter of the sexes and initiates courtship. The male incubates the eggs and tends the young. There are three species which have been recorded in India.

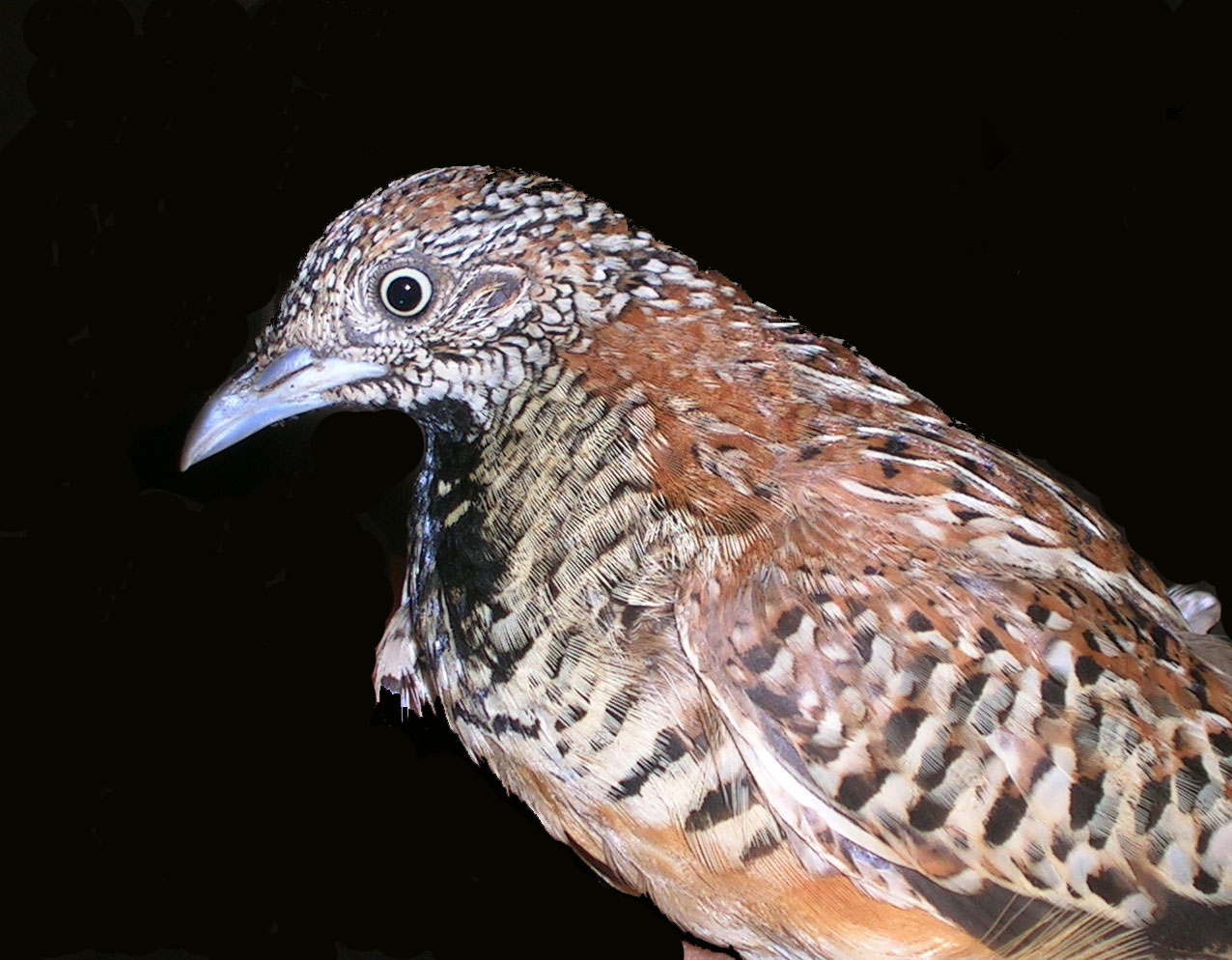
Barred buttonquail

Common name	Binomial	Comments
Common buttonquail	Turnix sylvaticus	
Yellow-legged buttonquail	Turnix tanki	
Barred buttonquail	Turnix suscitator	

== Stone-curlews and thick-knees ==
Order: Charadriiformes Family: Burhinidae

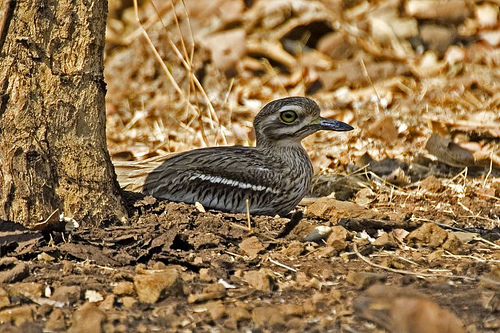
Indian stone-curlew

Stone-curlews are a group of largely tropical waders in the family Burhinidae. They are found worldwide within the tropical zone, with some species also breeding in temperate Europe and Australia. They are medium to large waders with strong black or yellow-black bills, large yellow eyes and cryptic plumage. Despite being classed as waders, most species have a preference for arid or semi-arid habitats.

Common name	Binomial	Comments
Indian stone-curlew	Burhinus indicus	Occurrence of Eurasian stone-curlew, Burhinus oedicnemus, in India is not established
Great stone-curlew	Esacus recurvirostris	Near threatened
Beach stone-curlew	Esacus magnirostris	Near threatened

== Oystercatchers ==
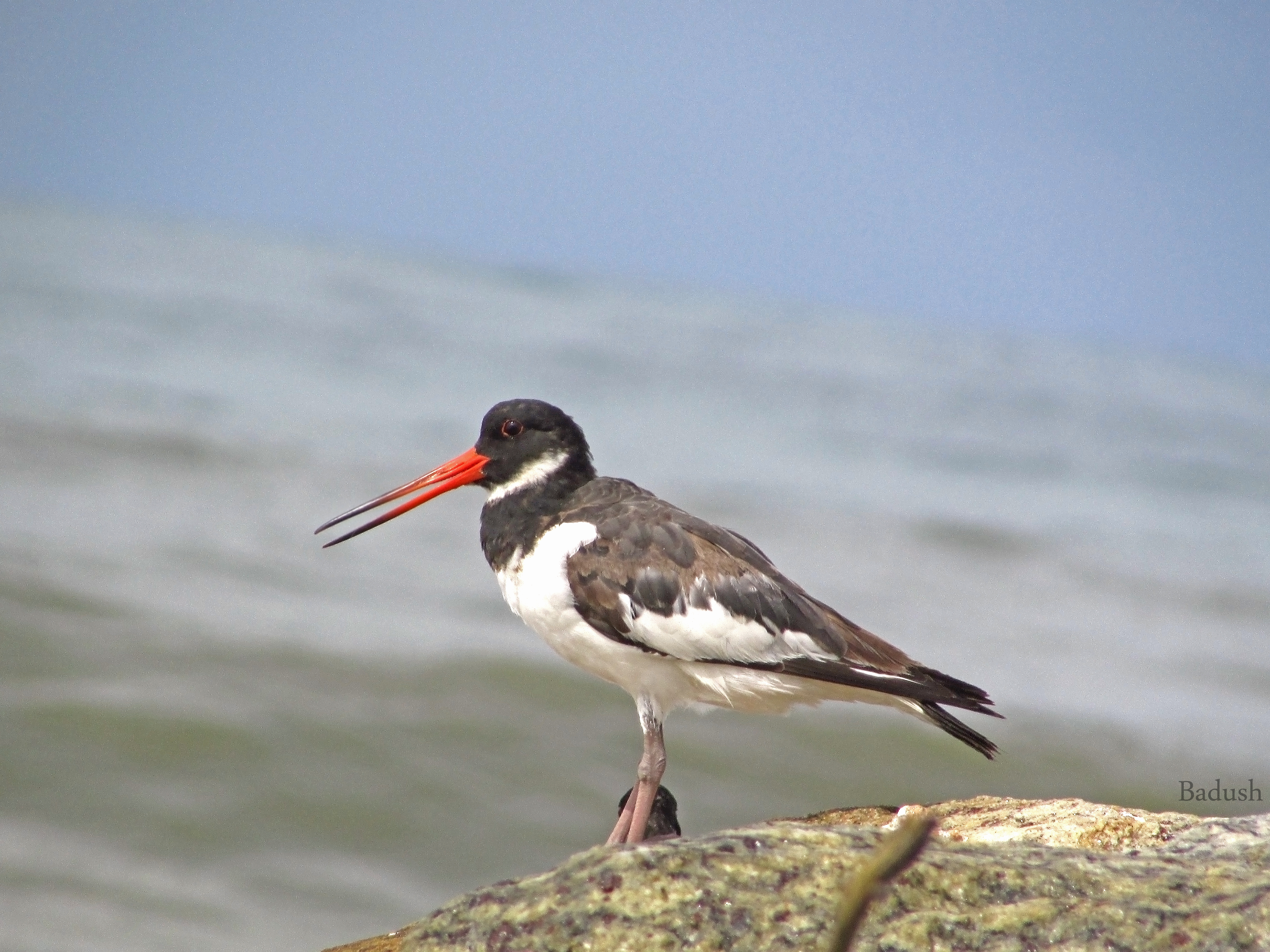
Eurasian oystercatcher

Order: Charadriiformes Family: Haematopodidae

The oystercatchers are large and noisy plover-like birds, with strong bills used for smashing or prising open molluscs. There is one species which occurs in India.

Common name	Binomial	Comments
Eurasian oystercatcher	Haematopus ostralegus	Near threatened

== Ibisbill ==
Ibisbill

Order: Charadriiformes Family: Ibidorhynchidae

The ibisbill is related to the waders, but is sufficiently distinctive to be a family unto itself. The adult is grey with a white belly, red legs, a long down curved bill, and a black face and breast band.

Common name	Binomial	Comments
Ibisbill	Ibidorhyncha struthersii	

== Stilts and avocets ==
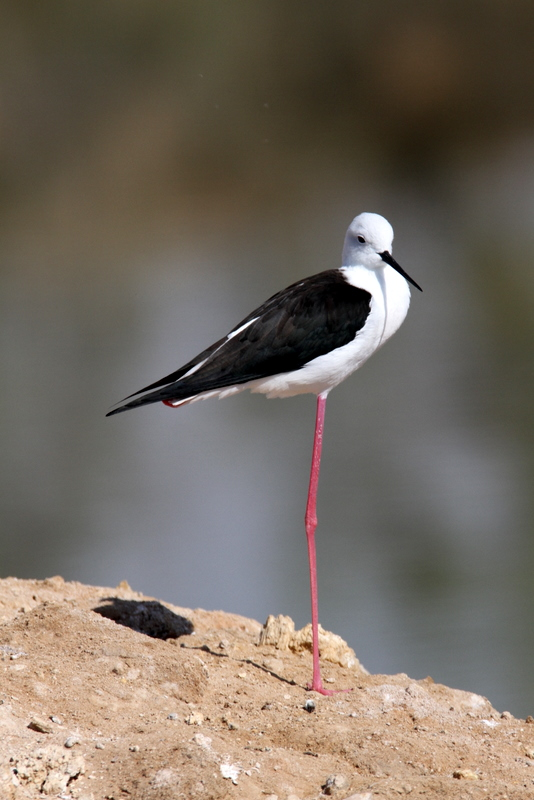
Black-winged stilt

Order: Charadriiformes Family: Recurvirostridae

Recurvirostridae is a family of large wading birds, which includes the avocets and stilts. The avocets have long legs and long up-curved bills. The stilts have extremely long legs and long, thin, straight bills. There are two species which have been recorded in India.

Common name	Binomial	Comments
Black-winged stilt	Himantopus himantopus	
Pied avocet	Recurvirostra avosetta	

== Plovers ==
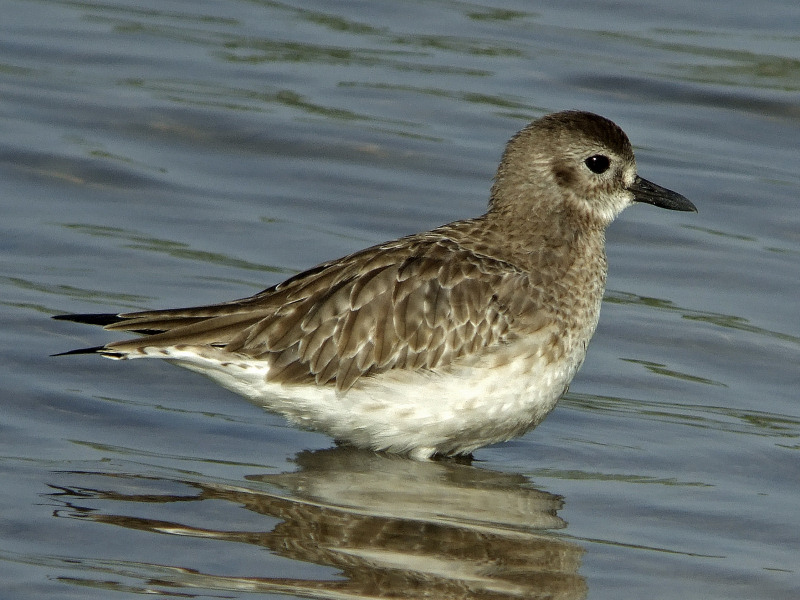
Grey plover

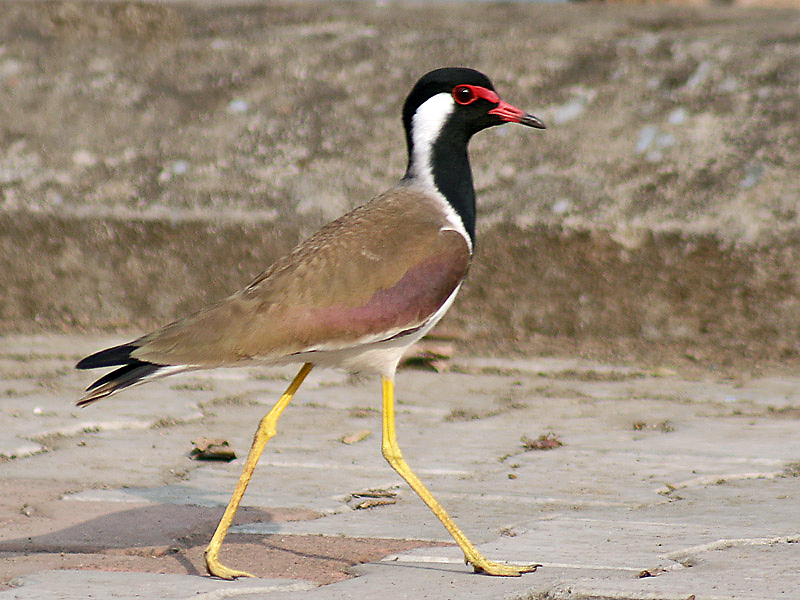
Red-wattled lapwing

Order: Charadriiformes Family: Charadriidae

The family Charadriidae includes the plovers, dotterels and lapwings. They are small to medium-sized birds with compact bodies, short, thick necks and long, usually pointed, wings. They are found in open country worldwide, mostly in habitats near water. There are 22 species which have been recorded in India.

Common name	Binomial	Comments
Northern lapwing	Vanellus vanellus	Near threatened
Spur-winged lapwing	Vanellus spinosus	(V)
River lapwing	Vanellus duvaucelii	Near threatened
Yellow-wattled lapwing	Vanellus malabaricus	
Grey-headed lapwing	Vanellus cinereus	
Red-wattled lapwing	Vanellus indicus	
Sociable lapwing	Vanellus gregarius	Critically endangered
White-tailed lapwing	Vanellus leucurus	
European golden plover	Pluvialis apricaria	(V)
Pacific golden plover	Pluvialis fulva	
American golden plover	Pluvialis dominica	(V)
Grey plover	Pluvialis squatarola	
Common ringed plover	Charadrius hiaticula	(V)
Long-billed plover	Charadrius placidus	
Little ringed plover	Charadrius dubius	
Kentish plover	Charadrius alexandrinus	
White-faced plover	Charadrius dealbatus	(V)
Siberian sand plover	Charadrius mongolus	
Tibetan sand plover	Charadrius atrifrons	
Greater sand plover	Charadrius leschenaultii	
Caspian plover	Charadrius asiaticus	(V)
Oriental plover	Charadrius veredus	(V)

== Painted-snipes ==
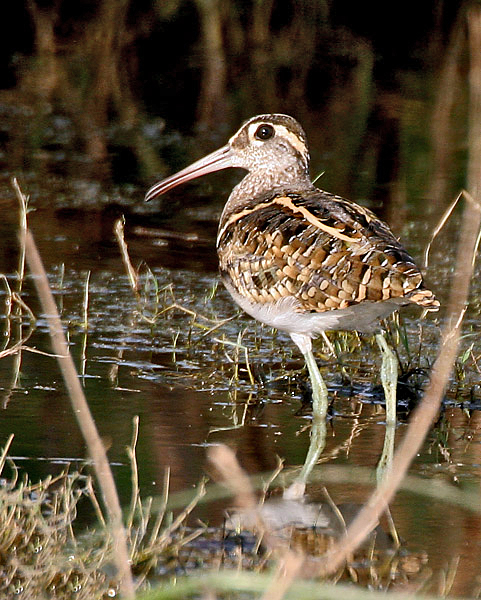
Greater painted-snipe

Order: Charadriiformes Family: Rostratulidae

Painted-snipes are short-legged, long-billed birds similar in shape to the true snipes, but more brightly coloured. There is one species which occurs in India.

Common name	Binomial	Comments
Greater painted-snipe	Rostratula benghalensis	

== Jacanas ==
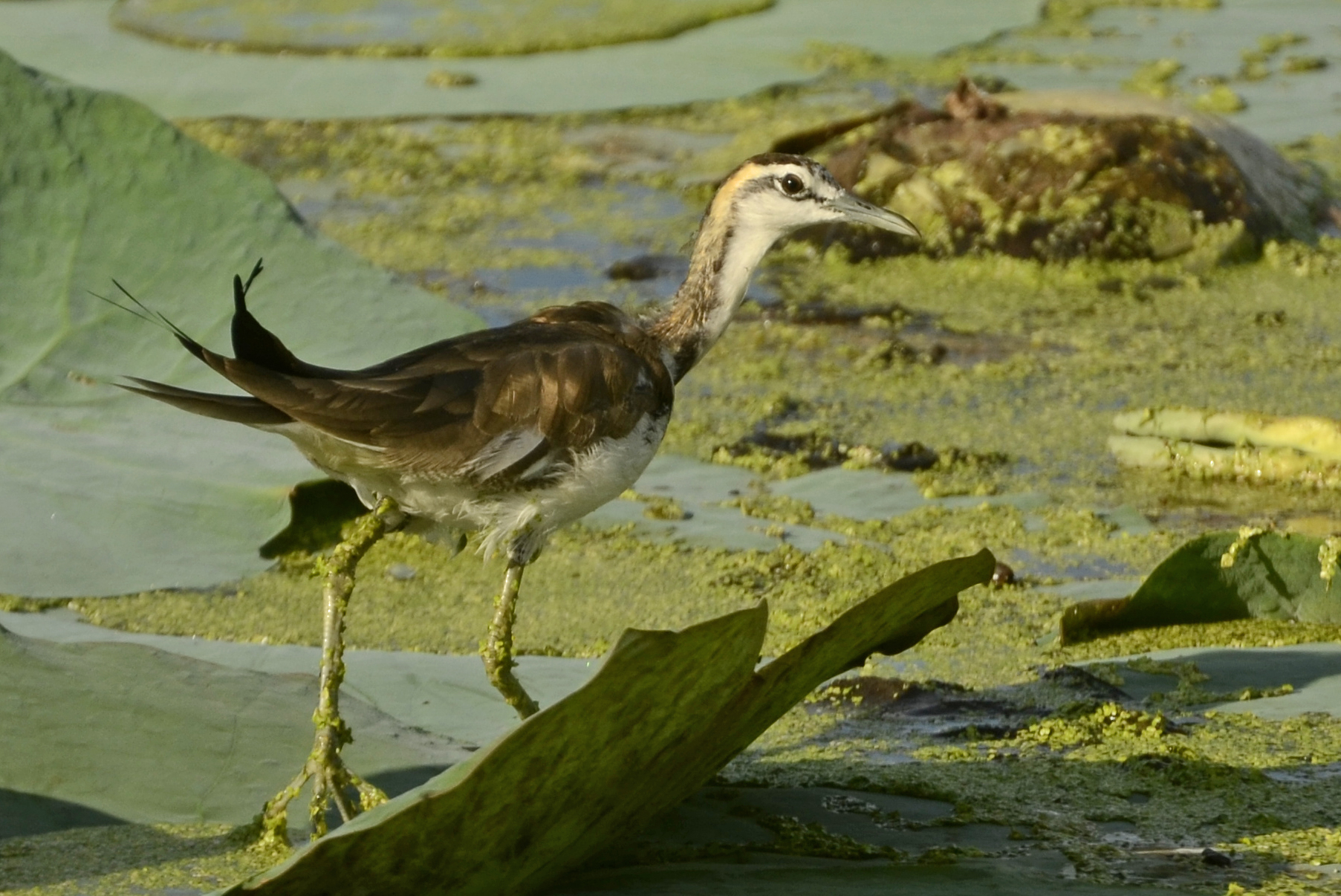
Pheasant-tailed jacana

Order: Charadriiformes Family: Jacanidae

The jacanas are a group of tropical waders in the family Jacanidae. They are found throughout the tropics. They are identifiable by their huge feet and claws which enable them to walk on floating vegetation in the shallow lakes that are their preferred habitat. There are two species which have been recorded in India.

Common name	Binomial	Comments
Pheasant-tailed jacana	Hydrophasianus chirurgus	
Bronze-winged jacana	Metopidius indicus	

== Sandpipers and snipes ==
Order: Charadriiformes Family: Scolopacidae

Scolopacidae is a large diverse family of small to medium-sized shorebirds including the sandpipers, curlews, godwits, shanks, tattlers, woodcocks, snipes, dowitchers and phalaropes. The majority of these species eat small invertebrates picked out of the mud or soil. Variation in length of legs and bills enables multiple species to feed in the same habitat, particularly on the coast, without direct competition for food. There are 43 species which have been recorded in India.

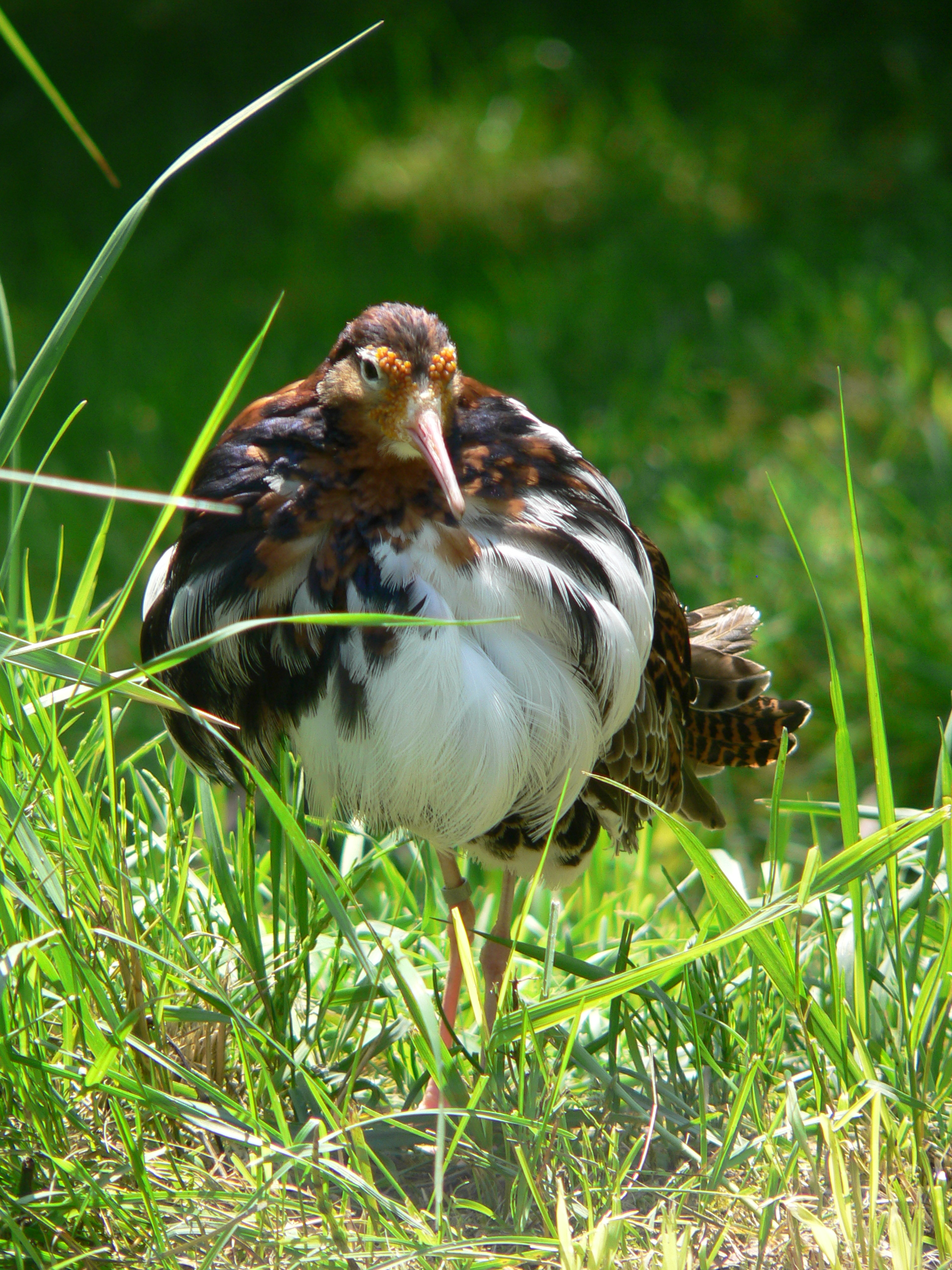
Ruff

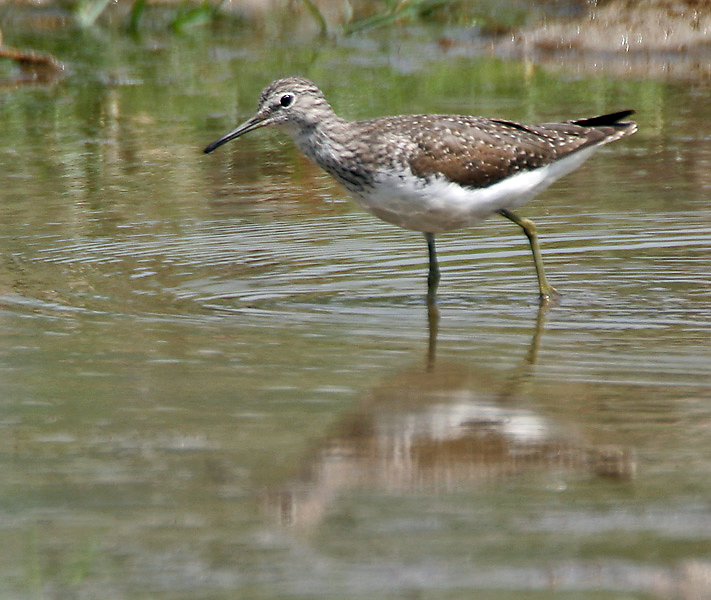
Green sandpiper

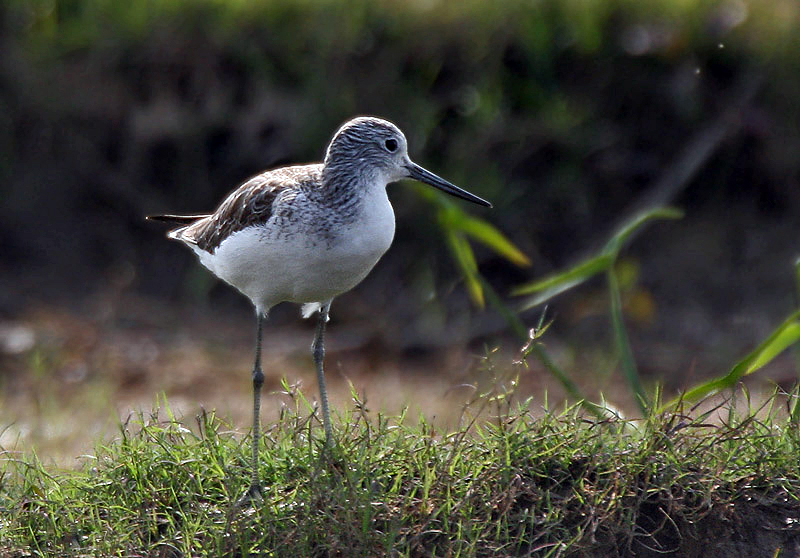
Common greenshank

Common name	Binomial	Comments
Eurasian whimbrel	Numenius phaeopus	
Eurasian curlew	Numenius arquata	Near threatened
Bar-tailed godwit	Limosa lapponica	Near threatened
Black-tailed godwit	Limosa limosa	Near threatened
Ruddy turnstone	Arenaria interpres	Near threatened
Great knot	Calidris tenuirostris	Endangered
Red knot	Calidris canutus	(V); near threatened
Ruff	Calidris pugnax	
Broad-billed sandpiper	Calidris falcinellus	Vulnerable
Sharp-tailed sandpiper	Calidris acuminata	(V); vulnerable
Stilt sandpiper	Calidris himantopus	(V); near threatened
Curlew sandpiper	Calidris ferruginea	Vulnerable
Temminck's stint	Calidris temminckii	
Long-toed stint	Calidris subminuta	
Spoon-billed sandpiper	Calidris pygmaea	(V); critically endangered
Red-necked stint	Calidris ruficollis	Near threatened
Sanderling	Calidris alba	
Dunlin	Calidris alpina	Near threatened
Little stint	Calidris minuta	
Buff-breasted sandpiper	Calidris subruficollis	(V); vulnerable
Pectoral sandpiper	Calidris melanotos	(V)
Asian dowitcher	Limnodromus semipalmatus	Near threatened
Long-billed dowitcher	Limnodromus scolopaceus	(V); near threatened
Eurasian woodcock	Scolopax rusticola	
Jack snipe	Lymnocryptes minimus	
Solitary snipe	Gallinago solitaria	
Wood snipe	Gallinago nemoricola	Vulnerable
Pin-tailed snipe	Gallinago stenura	
Swinhoe's snipe	Gallinago megala	
Great snipe	Gallinago media	(V); near threatened
Common snipe	Gallinago gallinago	
Terek sandpiper	Xenus cinereus	
Red-necked phalarope	Phalaropus lobatus	
Red phalarope	Phalaropus fulicarius	(V)
Common sandpiper	Actitis hypoleucos	
Green sandpiper	Tringa ochropus	
Grey-tailed tattler	Tringa brevipes	(V)
Common redshank	Tringa totanus	
Marsh sandpiper	Tringa stagnatilis	
Wood sandpiper	Tringa glareola	
Spotted redshank	Tringa erythropus	
Common greenshank	Tringa nebularia	
Nordmann's greenshank	Tringa guttifer	(V); endangered

== Crab-plover ==
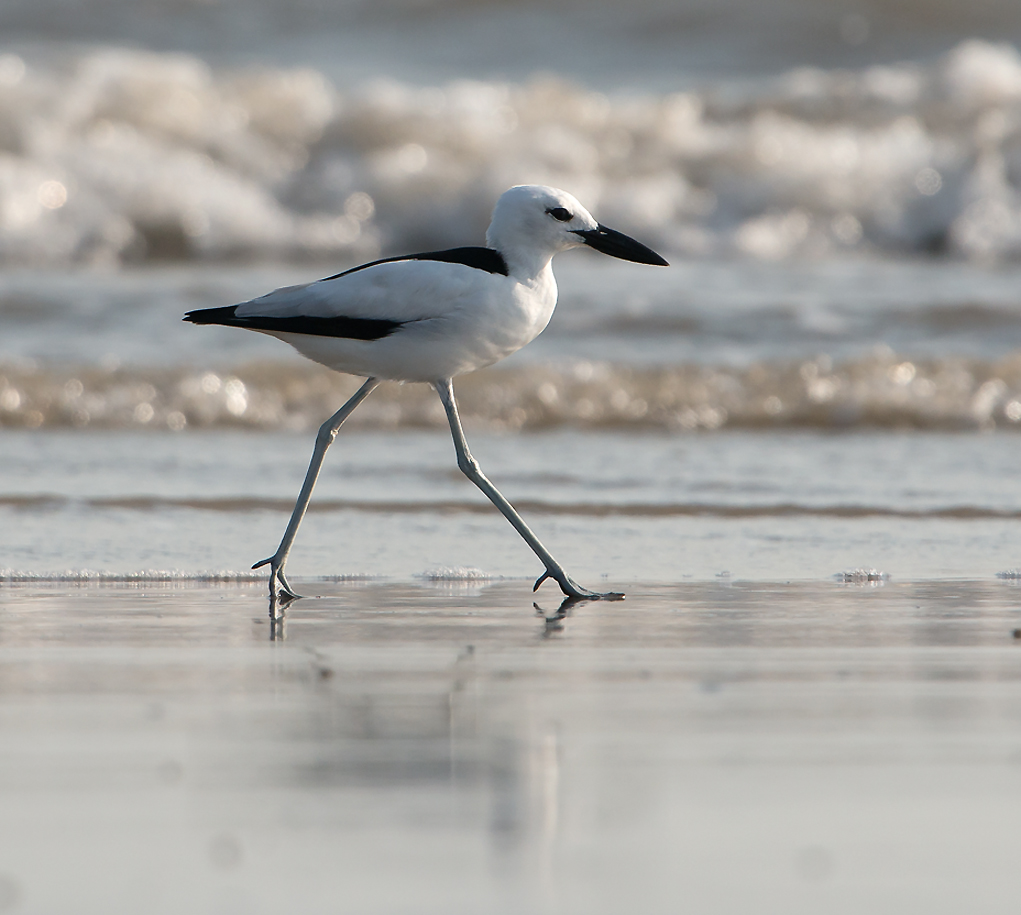
Crab-plover

Order: Charadriiformes Family: Dromadidae

The crab-plover is related to the waders. It resembles a plover but with very long grey legs and a strong heavy black bill similar to a tern. It has black-and-white plumage, a long neck, partially webbed feet and a bill designed for eating crabs.

Common name	Binomial	Comments
Crab-plover	Dromas ardeola	

== Coursers and pratincoles ==
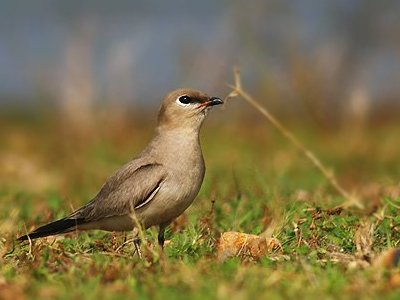
Small pratincole

Order: Charadriiformes Family: Glareolidae

Glareolidae is a family of wading birds comprising the pratincoles, which have short legs, long pointed wings and long forked tails, and the coursers, which have long legs, short wings and long, pointed bills which curve downwards. There are six species which have been recorded in India.

Common name	Binomial	Comments
Cream-coloured courser	Cursorius cursor	
Indian courser	Cursorius coromandelicus	
Jerdon's courser	Rhinoptilus bitorquatus	(E); critically endangered
Collared pratincole	Glareola pratincola	
Oriental pratincole	Glareola maldivarum	
Small pratincole	Glareola lactea	

== Gulls, terns, and skimmers ==
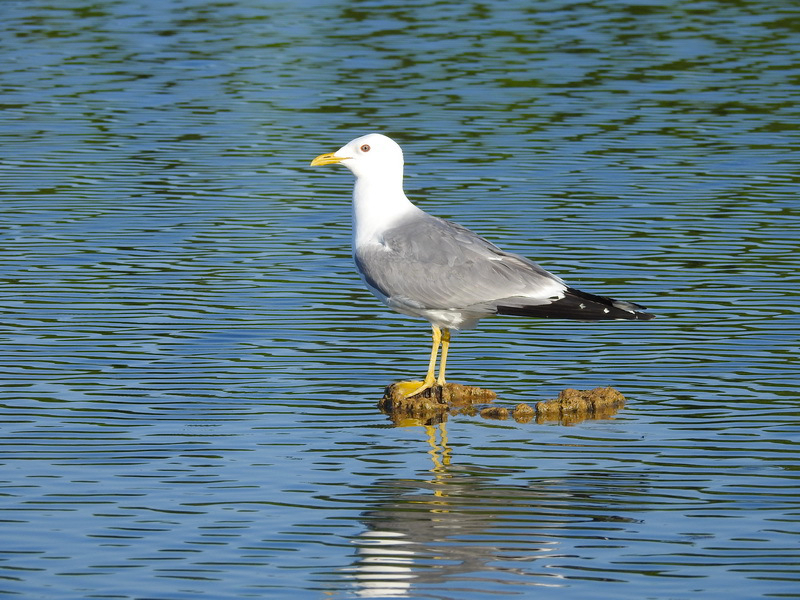
Common gull

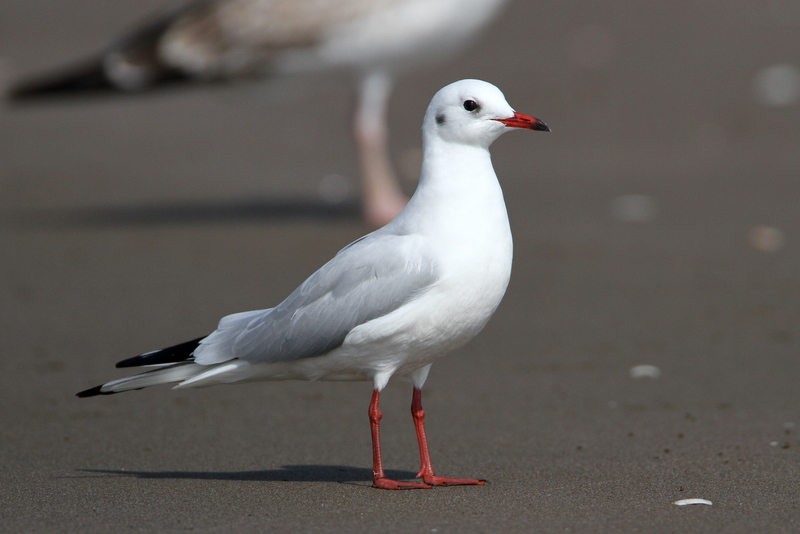
Black-headed gull

Order: Charadriiformes Family: Laridae

Laridae is a family of medium to large seabirds, the gulls, terns, and skimmers. Gulls are typically grey or white, often with black markings on the head or wings. They have stout, longish bills and webbed feet. Terns are a group of generally medium to large seabirds typically with grey or white plumage, often with black markings on the head. Most terns hunt fish by diving but some pick insects off the surface of fresh water. Terns are generally long-lived birds, with several species known to live in excess of 30 years. Skimmers are a small family of tropical tern-like birds. They have an elongated lower mandible which they use to feed by flying low over the water surface and skimming the water for small fish.

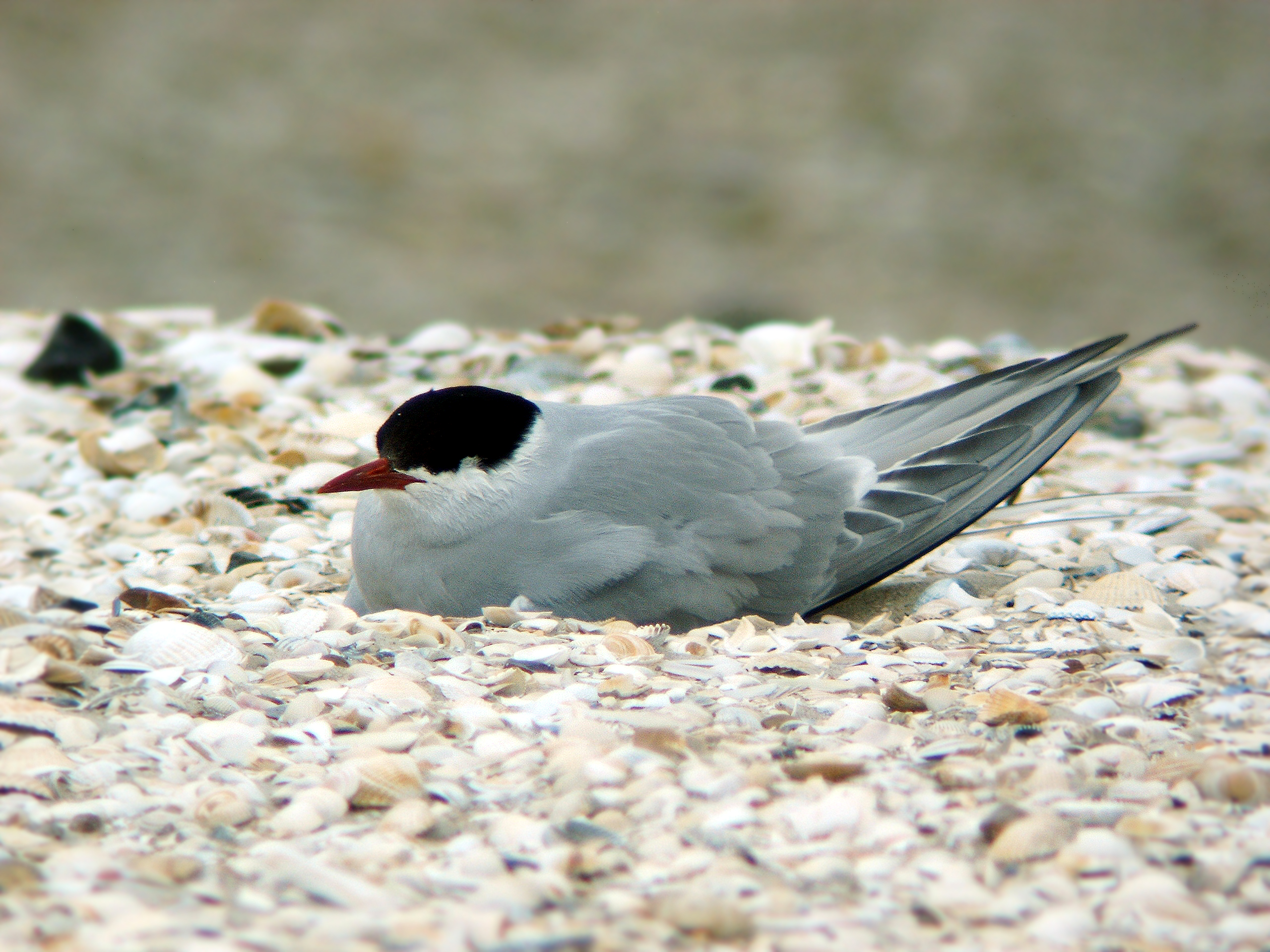
Arctic tern

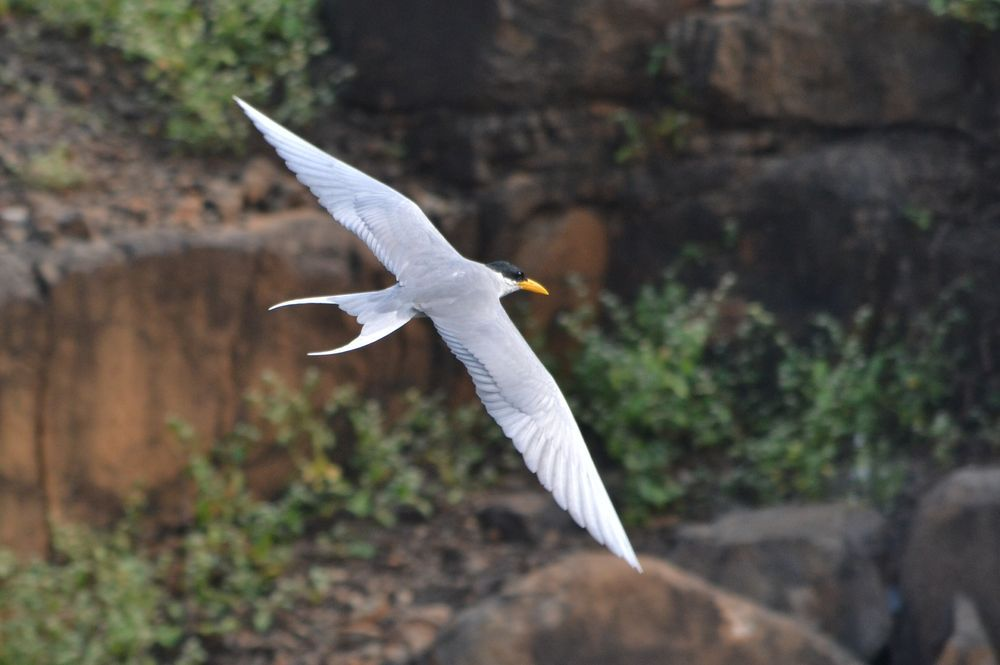
Indian river tern

Common name	Binomial	Comments
Brown noddy	Anous stolidus	
Lesser noddy	Anous tenuirostris	(V)
Black noddy	Anous minutus	(V)
Blue-billed white tern	Gygis candida	(V)
Indian skimmer	Rynchops albicollis	Endangered
Black-legged kittiwake	Rissa tridactyla	(V); vulnerable
Sabine's gull	Xema sabini	(V)
Slender-billed gull	Chroicocephalus genei	
Brown-headed gull	Chroicocephalus brunnicephalus	
Black-headed gull	Chroicocephalus ridibundus	
Little gull	Hydrocoloeus minutus	(V)
Franklin's gull	Leucophaeus pipixcan	(V)
Laughing gull	Leucophaeus atricilla	(V)
Pallas's gull	Ichthyaetus ichthyaetus	
White-eyed gull	Ichthyaetus leucophthalmus	(V)
Sooty gull	Ichthyaetus hemprichii	(V)
Common gull	Larus canus	(V)
Mongolian gull	Larus mongolicus	(V)
Caspian gull	Larus cachinnans	
Lesser black-backed gull	Larus fuscus	
Gull-billed tern	Gelochelidon nilotica	
Caspian tern	Hydroprogne caspia	
Greater crested tern	Thalasseus bergii	
Lesser crested tern	Thalasseus bengalensis	
Sandwich tern	Thalasseus sandvicensis	
Little tern	Sternula albifrons	
Saunders's tern	Sternula saundersi	
Bridled tern	Onychoprion anaethetus	
Sooty tern	Onychoprion fuscatus	
River tern	Sterna aurantia	Vulnerable
Roseate tern	Sterna dougallii	
Black-naped tern	Sterna sumatrana	
Common tern	Sterna hirundo	
White-cheeked tern	Sterna repressa	
Arctic tern	Sterna paradisaea	(V)
Black-bellied tern	Sterna acuticauda	Endangered
Whiskered tern	Chlidonias hybrida	
White-winged tern	Chlidonias leucopterus	
Black tern	Chlidonias niger	(V)

== Skuas ==
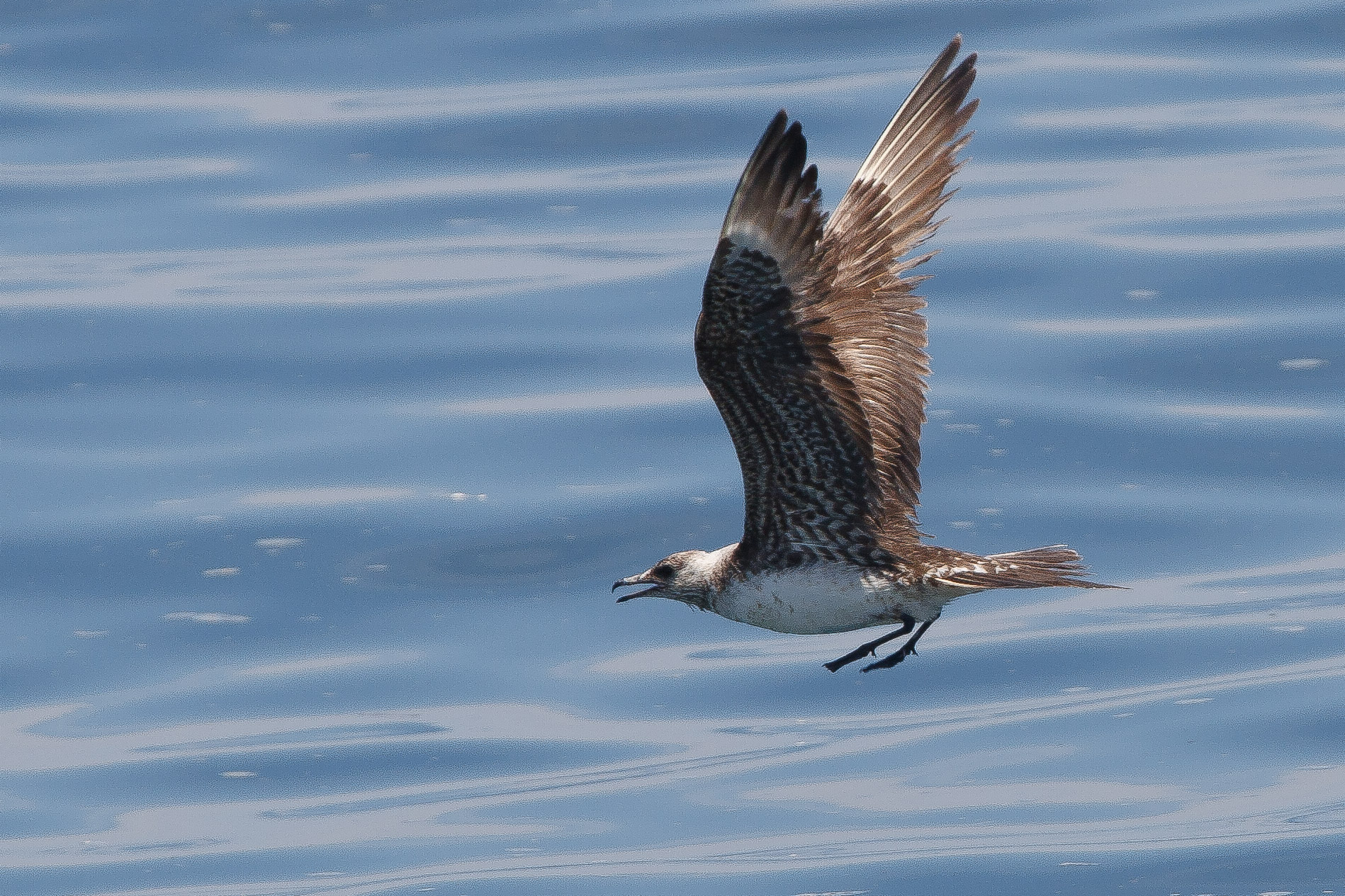
Parasitic jaeger

Order: Charadriiformes Family: Stercorariidae

The family Stercorariidae are, in general, medium to large birds, typically with grey or brown plumage, often with white markings on the wings. They nest on the ground in cool-temperate, arctic, and antarctic regions and many are long-distance migrants. There are five species which have been recorded in India. The three smaller species are called jaegers in North America.

Common name	Binomial	Comments
South polar skua	Stercorarius maccormicki	(V)
Brown skua	Stercorarius antarcticus	(V)
Pomarine skua	Stercorarius pomarinus	
Arctic skua	Stercorarius parasiticus	
Long-tailed skua	Stercorarius longicaudus	(V)

== Tropicbirds ==
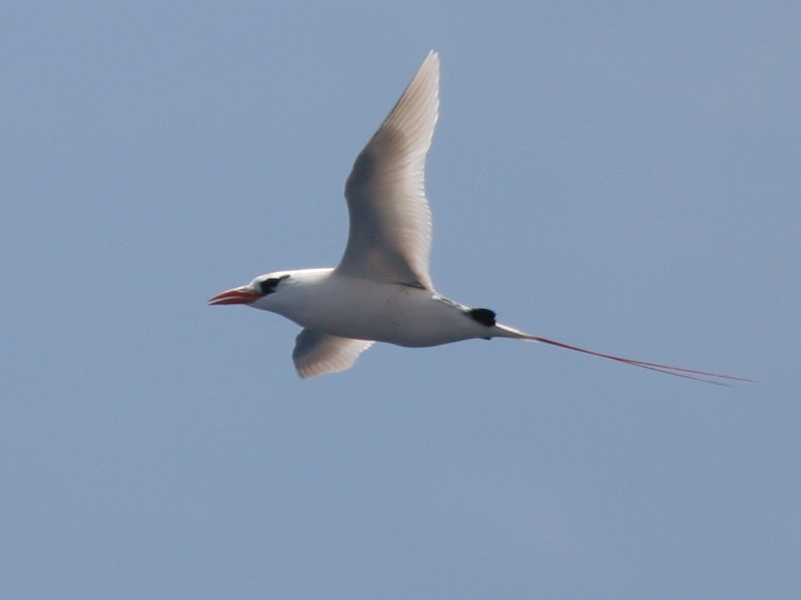
Red-tailed tropicbird

Order: Phaethontiformes Family: Phaethontidae

Tropicbirds are slender white birds of tropical oceans, with exceptionally long central tail feathers. Their heads and long wings have black markings.

Common name	Binomial	Comments
Red-billed tropicbird	Phaethon aethereus	(V)
Red-tailed tropicbird	Phaethon rubricauda	
White-tailed tropicbird	Phaethon lepturus	(V)

== Divers ==
Order: Gaviiformes Family: Gaviidae

Divers, known as "loons" in North America, are a group of aquatic birds found in northern Eurasia and North America. They are the size of a large duck or small goose, which they somewhat resemble when swimming, but to which they are completely unrelated. There are two species which have been recorded in India.

Common name	Binomial	Comments
Red-throated diver	Gavia stellata	(V)
Black-throated diver	Gavia arctica	(V)

== Austral storm petrels ==
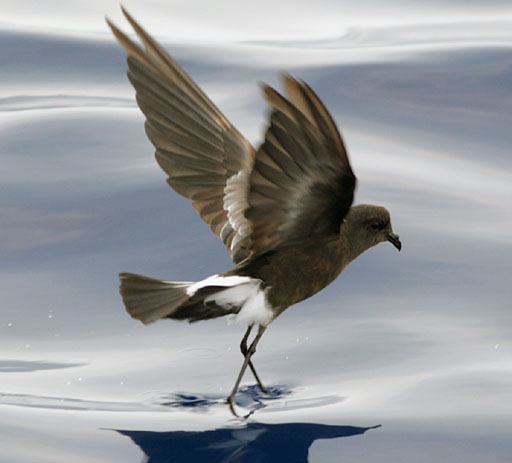
Wilson's storm petrel

Order: Procellariiformes Family: Oceanitidae

The storm petrels are relatives of the petrels and are the smallest seabirds. They feed on planktonic crustaceans and small fish picked from the surface, typically while hovering. The flight is fluttering and sometimes bat-like.

Common name	Binomial	Comments
Wilson's storm petrel	Oceanites oceanicus	
White-faced storm petrel	Pelagodroma marina	(V)
White-bellied storm petrel	Fregetta grallaria	(V)
Black-bellied storm petrel	Fregetta tropica	(V)

== Albatrosses ==
Order: Procellariiformes Family: Diomedeidae

The albatrosses are among the largest of flying birds, and the great albatrosses from the genus Diomedea have the largest wingspans of any extant birds.

Common name	Binomial	Comments
Light-mantled albatross	Phoebetria palpebrata	(V); near threatened

== Northern storm petrels ==
Order: Procellariiformes Family: Hydrobatidae

The northern storm petrels are relatives of the petrels and are the smallest seabirds. They feed on planktonic crustaceans and small fish picked from the surface, typically while hovering. The flight is fluttering and sometimes bat-like.

Common name	Binomial	Comments
Swinhoe's storm petrel	Hydrobates monorhis	Near threatened

== Petrels, shearwaters, and diving petrels ==
Order: Procellariiformes Family: Procellariidae

The procellariids are the main group of medium-sized shearwaters and petrels, characterised by united nostrils with medium septum and a long outer functional primary. There are 10 species which have been recorded in India.

Common name	Binomial	Comments
Barau's petrel	Pterodroma baraui	Endangered
Streaked shearwater	Calonectris leucomelas	Near threatened
Cory's shearwater	Calonectris borealis	(V); near threatened
Wedge-tailed shearwater	Ardenna pacifica	
Sooty shearwater	Ardenna grisea	(V)
Short-tailed shearwater	Ardenna tenuirostris	(V)
Flesh-footed shearwater	Ardenna carneipes	Near threatened
Persian shearwater	Puffinus persicus	
Tropical shearwater	Puffinus bailloni	
Jouanin's petrel	Bulweria fallax	Near threatened

== Storks ==
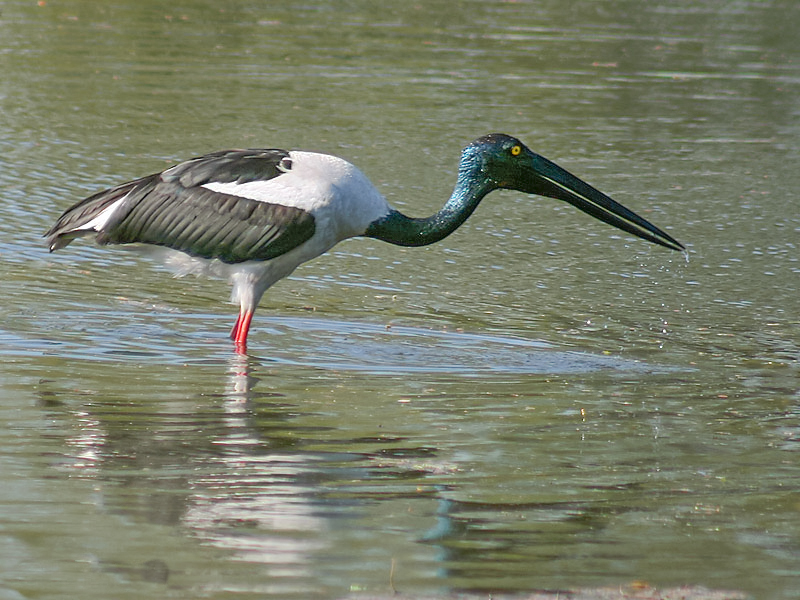
Black-necked stork

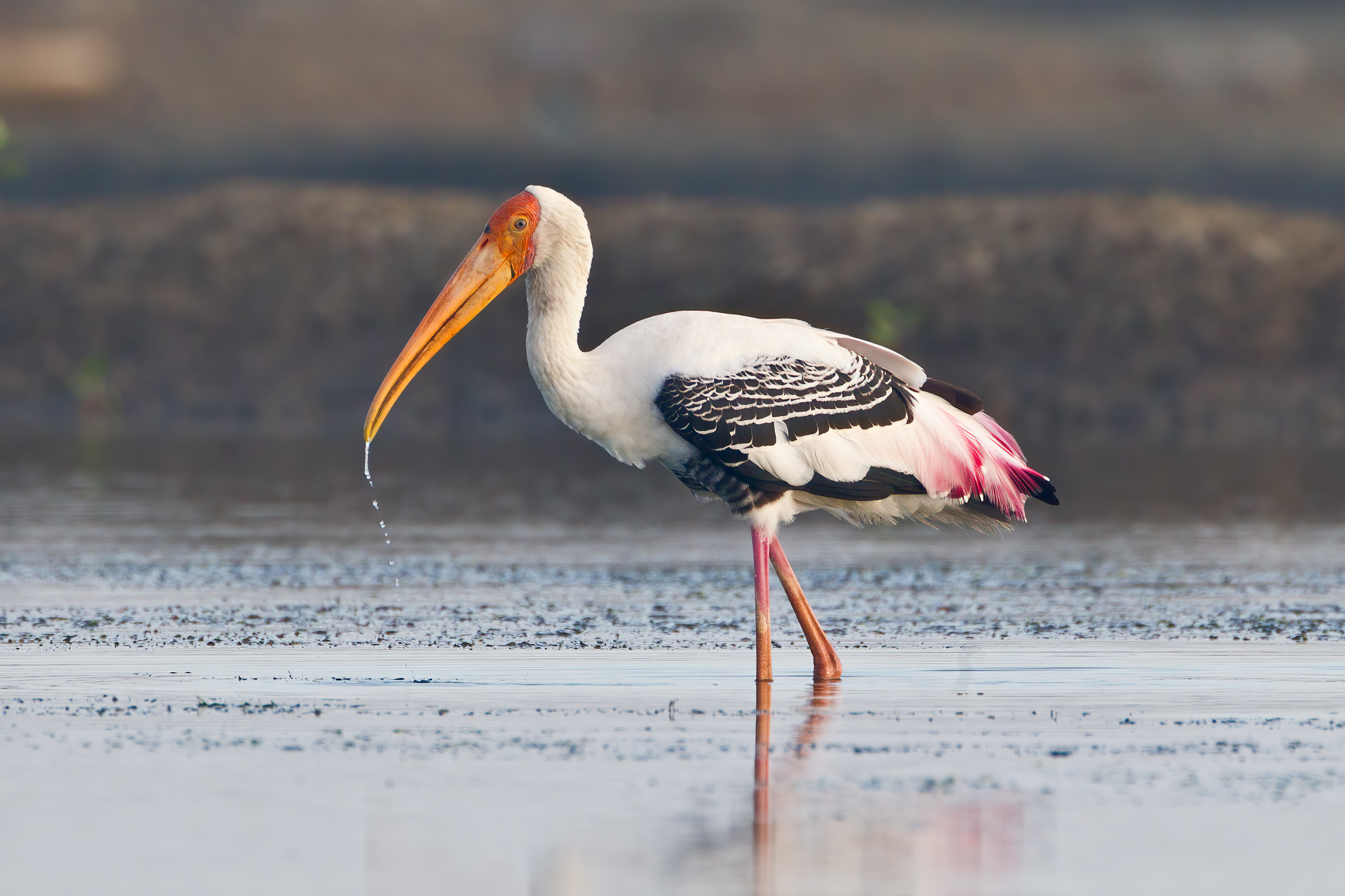
Painted stork

Order: Ciconiiformes Family: Ciconiidae

Storks are large, long-legged, long-necked, wading birds with long, stout bills. Storks are mute, but bill-clattering is an important mode of communication at the nest. Their nests can be large and may be reused for many years. Many species are migratory.

Common name	Binomial	Comments
Painted stork	Mycteria leucocephala	Near threatened
Asian openbill	Anastomus oscitans	
African openbill	Anastomus lamelligerus	(V)
Black stork	Ciconia nigra	
Asian woolly-necked stork	Ciconia episcopus	
White stork	Ciconia ciconia	
Black-necked stork	Ephippiorhynchus asiaticus	Near threatened
Lesser adjutant	Leptoptilos javanicus	Near threatened
Greater adjutant	Leptoptilos dubius	Near threatened

== Frigatebirds ==
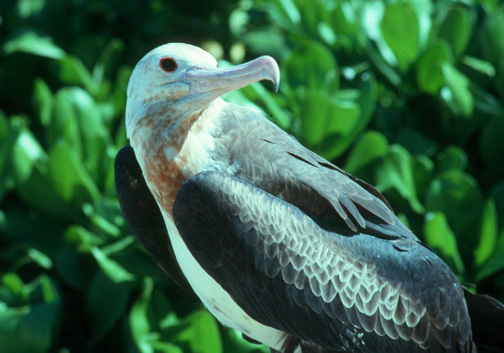
Great frigatebird

Order: Suliformes Family: Fregatidae

Frigatebirds are large seabirds usually found over tropical oceans. They are large, black-and-white or completely black, with long wings and deeply forked tails. The males have red inflatable throat pouches. They do not swim or walk and cannot take off from a flat surface. Having the largest wingspan-to-body-weight ratio of any bird, they are essentially aerial, able to stay aloft for more than a week.

Common name	Binomial	Comments
Christmas frigatebird	Fregata andrewsi	(V); vulnerable
Great frigatebird	Fregata minor	(V)
Lesser frigatebird	Fregata ariel	(V)

== Gannets and boobies ==
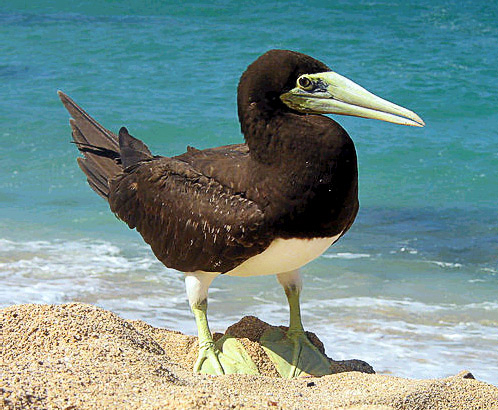
Brown booby

Order: Suliformes Family: Sulidae

The sulids comprise the gannets and boobies. Both groups are medium to large coastal seabirds that plunge-dive for fish.

Common name	Binomial	Comments
Masked booby	Sula dactylatra	(V)
Red-footed booby	Sula sula	(V)
Brown booby	Sula leucogaster	

== Anhingas and darters ==
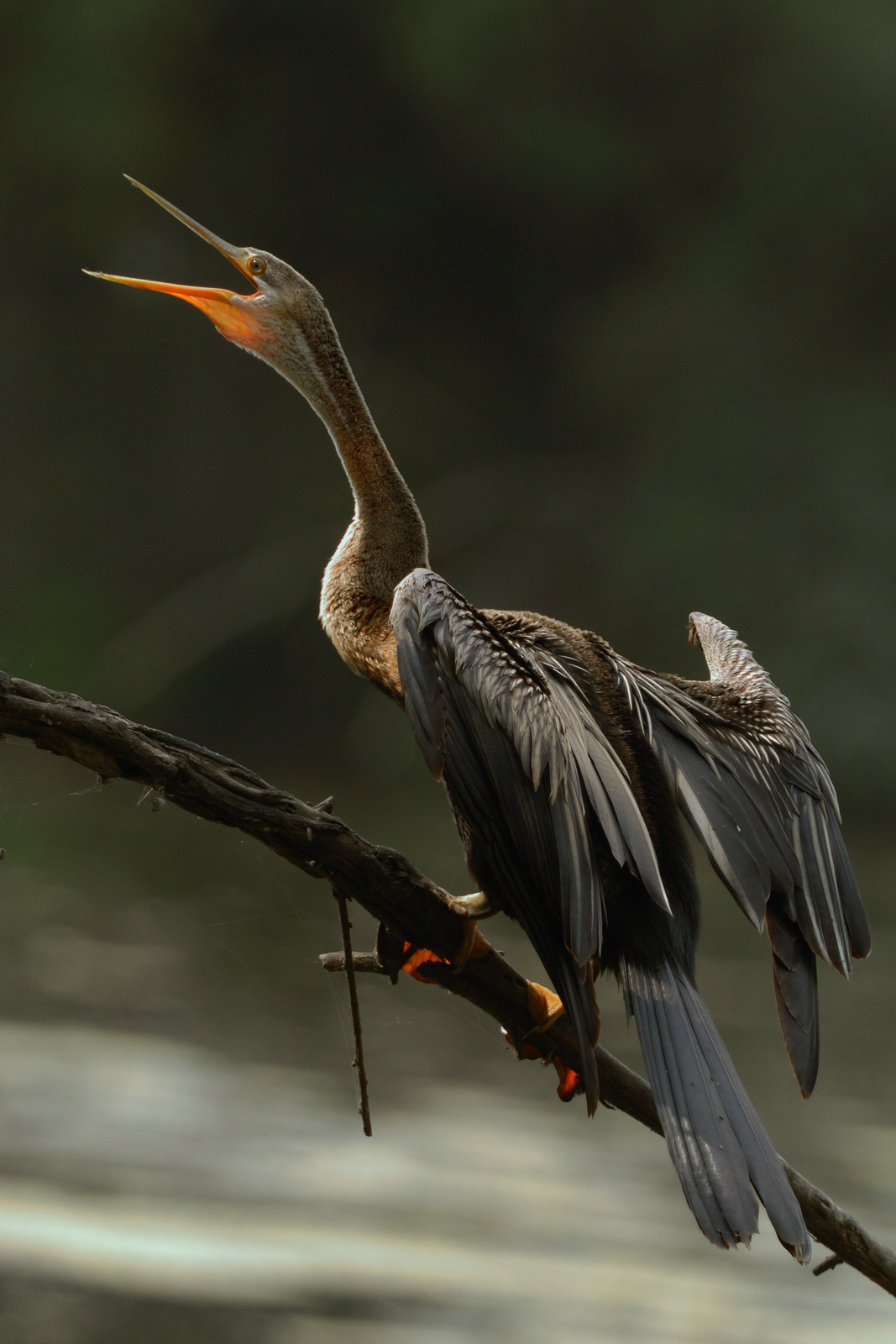
Oriental darter

Order: Suliformes Family: Anhingidae

Darters are often called "snake-birds" because of their long thin neck, which gives a snake-like appearance when they swim with their bodies submerged. The males have black and dark-brown plumage, an erectile crest on the nape and a larger bill than the female. The females have much paler plumage especially on the neck and underparts. The darters have completely webbed feet and their legs are short and set far back on the body. Their plumage is somewhat permeable, like that of cormorants, and they spread their wings to dry after diving.

Common name	Binomial	Comments
Oriental darter	Anhinga melanogaster	

== Cormorants and shags ==
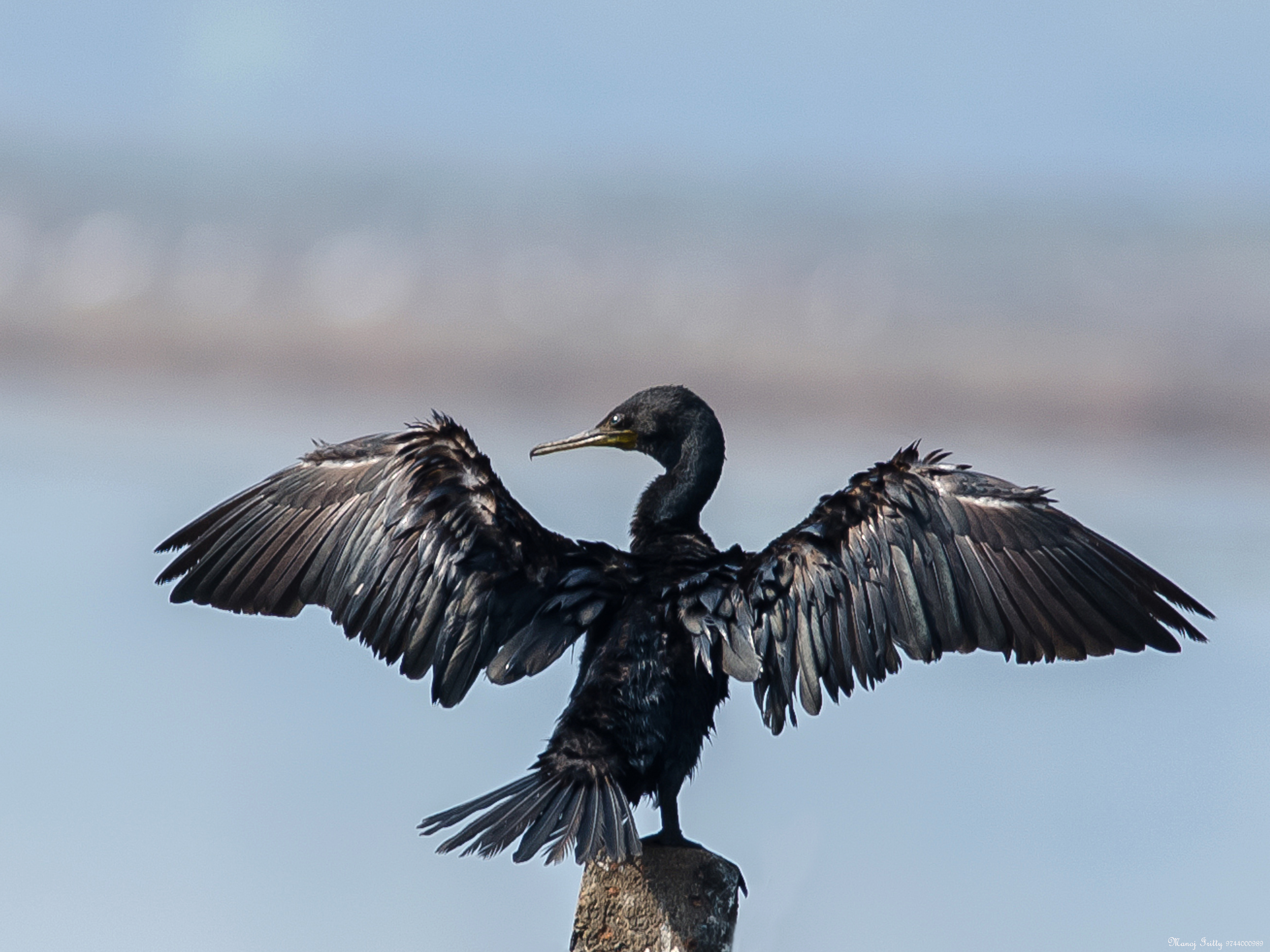
Indian cormorant

Order: Suliformes Family: Phalacrocoracidae

Phalacrocoracidae is a family of medium to large coastal, fish-eating seabirds that includes cormorants and shags. Plumage colouration varies, with the majority having mainly dark plumage, some species being black-and-white; many have brightly coloured eyes and throat pouches.

Common name	Binomial	Comments
Little cormorant	Microcarbo niger	
Indian cormorant	Phalacrocorax fuscicollis	
Great cormorant	Phalacrocorax carbo	

== Ibises and spoonbills ==
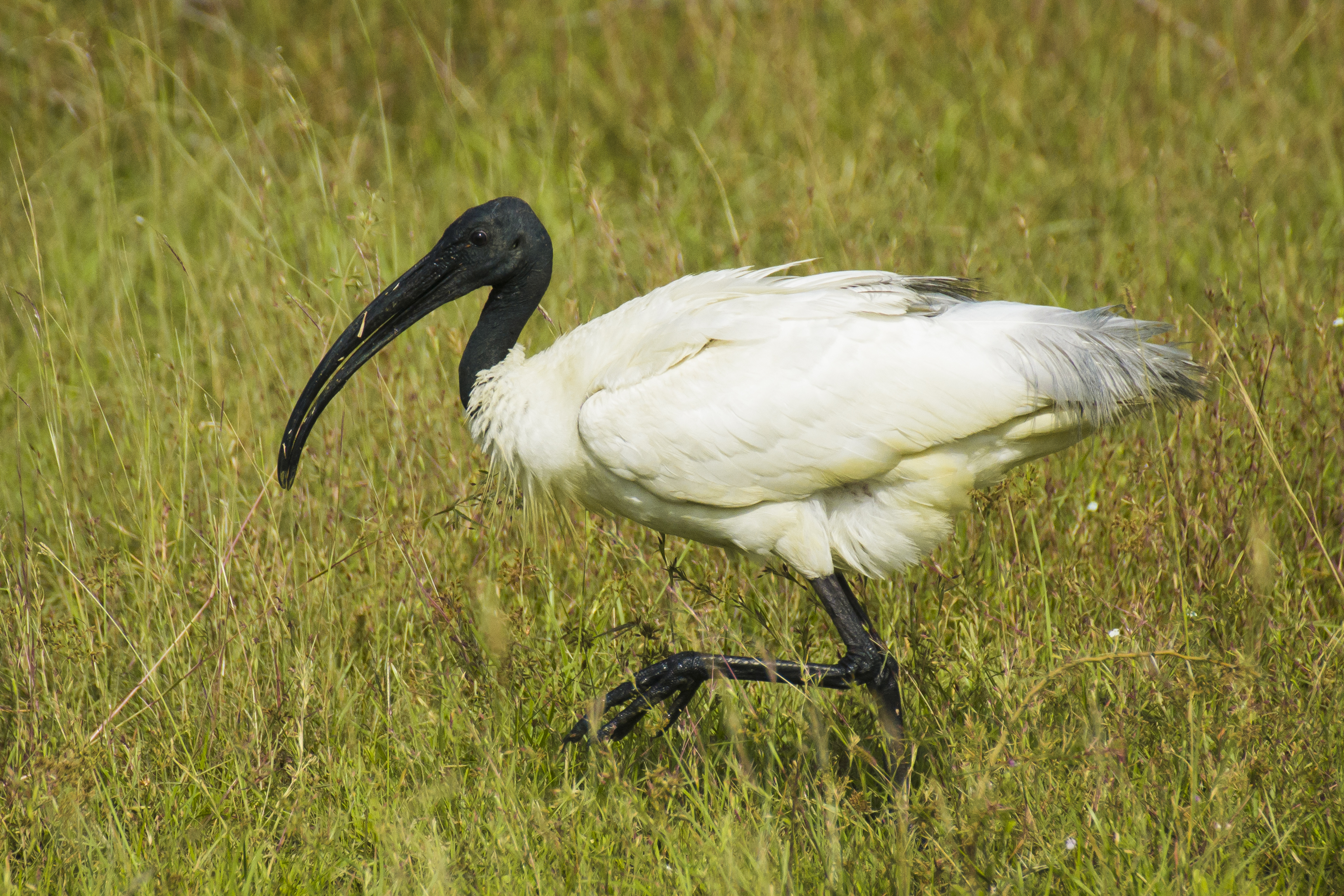
Black-headed ibis

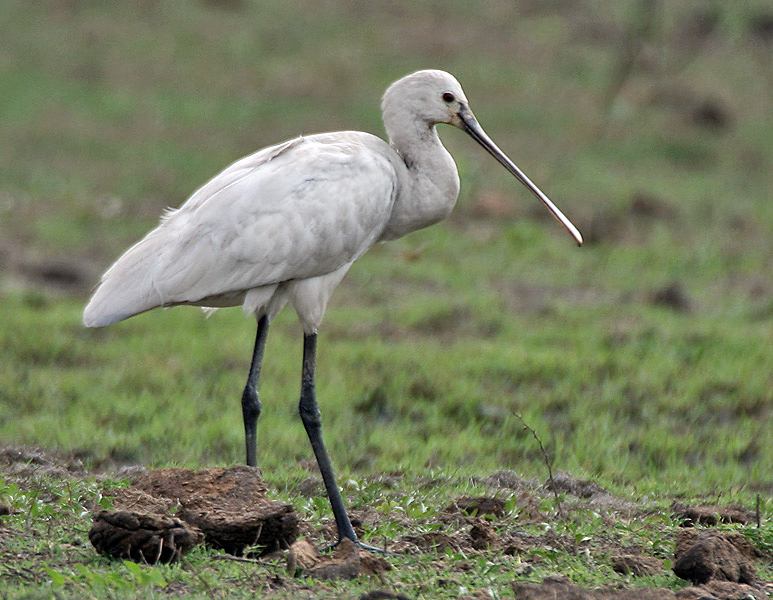
Eurasian spoonbill

Order: Pelecaniformes Family: Threskiornithidae

Threskiornithidae is a family of large terrestrial and wading birds which includes the ibises and spoonbills. They have long, broad wings with 11 primary and about 20 secondary feathers. They are strong fliers and despite their size and weight, are very capable soarers.

Common name	Binomial	Comments
Black-headed ibis	Threskiornis melanocephalus	
Red-naped ibis	Pseudibis papillosa	
Glossy ibis	Plegadis falcinellus	
Eurasian spoonbill	Platalea leucorodia	

== Herons and bitterns ==
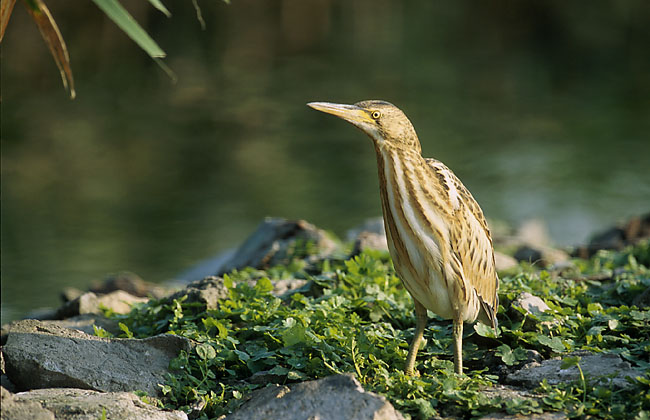
Little bittern

Order: Pelecaniformes Family: Ardeidae

The family Ardeidae contains the bitterns, herons and egrets. Herons and egrets are medium to large wading birds with long necks and legs. Bitterns tend to be shorter necked and more wary. Members of Ardeidae fly with their necks retracted, unlike other long-necked birds such as storks, ibises and spoonbills.

Common name	Binomial	Comments
Eurasian bittern	Botaurus stellaris	
Little bittern	Botaurus minutus	
Yellow bittern	Botaurus sinensis	
Cinnamon bittern	Botaurus cinnamomeus	
Black bittern	Botaurus flavicollis	
White-eared night heron	Gorsachius magnificus	(V); endangered
Malayan night heron	Gorsachius melanolophus	
Black-crowned night heron	Nycticorax nycticorax	
Little heron	Butorides atricapilla	
Indian pond heron	Ardeola grayii	
Chinese pond heron	Ardeola bacchus	
Javan pond heron	Ardeola speciosa	(V)
Eastern cattle egret	Ardea coromanda	
Grey heron	Ardea cinerea	
White-bellied heron	Ardea insignis	Critically endangered
Goliath heron	Ardea goliath	(V)
Purple heron	Ardea purpurea	
Great egret	Ardea alba	
Medium egret	Ardea intermedia	
Little egret	Egretta garzetta	
Western reef heron	Egretta gularis	
Pacific reef heron	Egretta sacra	
Chinese egret	Egretta eulophotes	(V); vulnerable

== Pelicans ==
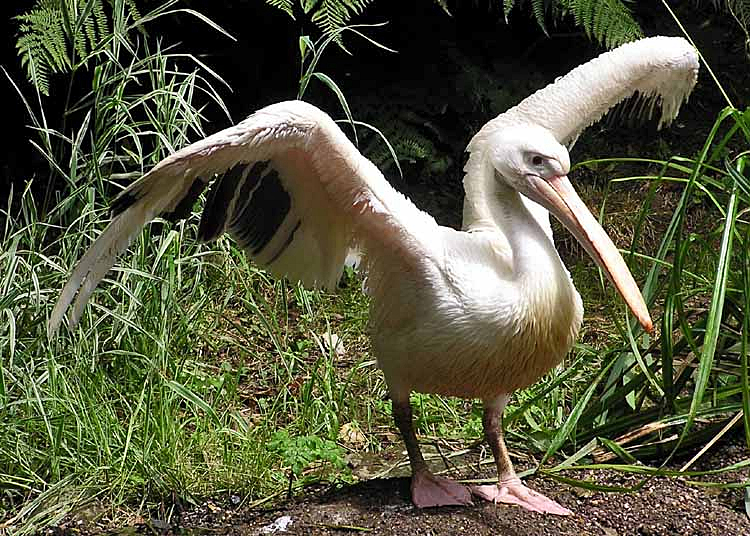
Great white pelican

Order: Pelecaniformes Family: Pelecanidae

Pelicans are large water birds with a distinctive pouch under their beak. As with other members of the order Pelecaniformes, they have webbed feet with four toes. There are three species which have been recorded in India.

Common name	Binomial	Comments
Great white pelican	Pelecanus onocrotalus	
Spot-billed pelican	Pelecanus philippensis	Near threatened
Dalmatian pelican	Pelecanus crispus	Near threatened

== Osprey ==
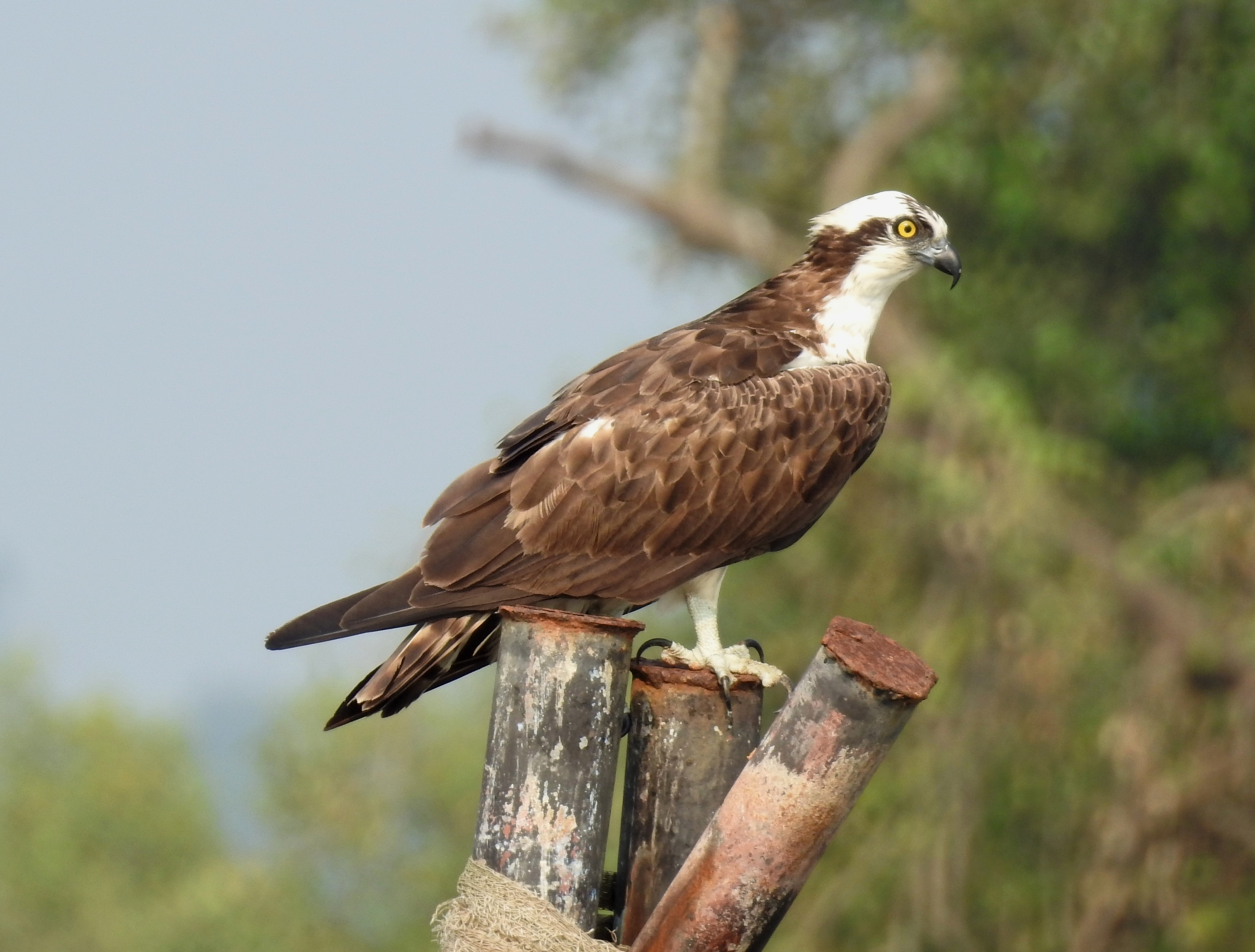
Osprey

Order: Accipitriformes Family: Pandionidae

The family Pandionidae contains usually only one species, the osprey. The osprey is a medium-large raptor which is a specialist fish-eater with most taxonomic authorities consider a worldwide distribution.

Common name	Binomial	Comments
Osprey	Pandion haliaetus	

== Kites, hawks, and eagles ==
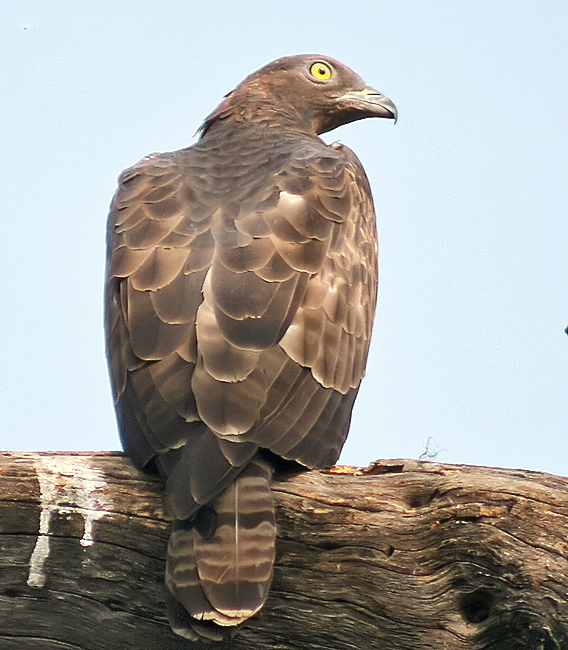
Crested honey buzzard

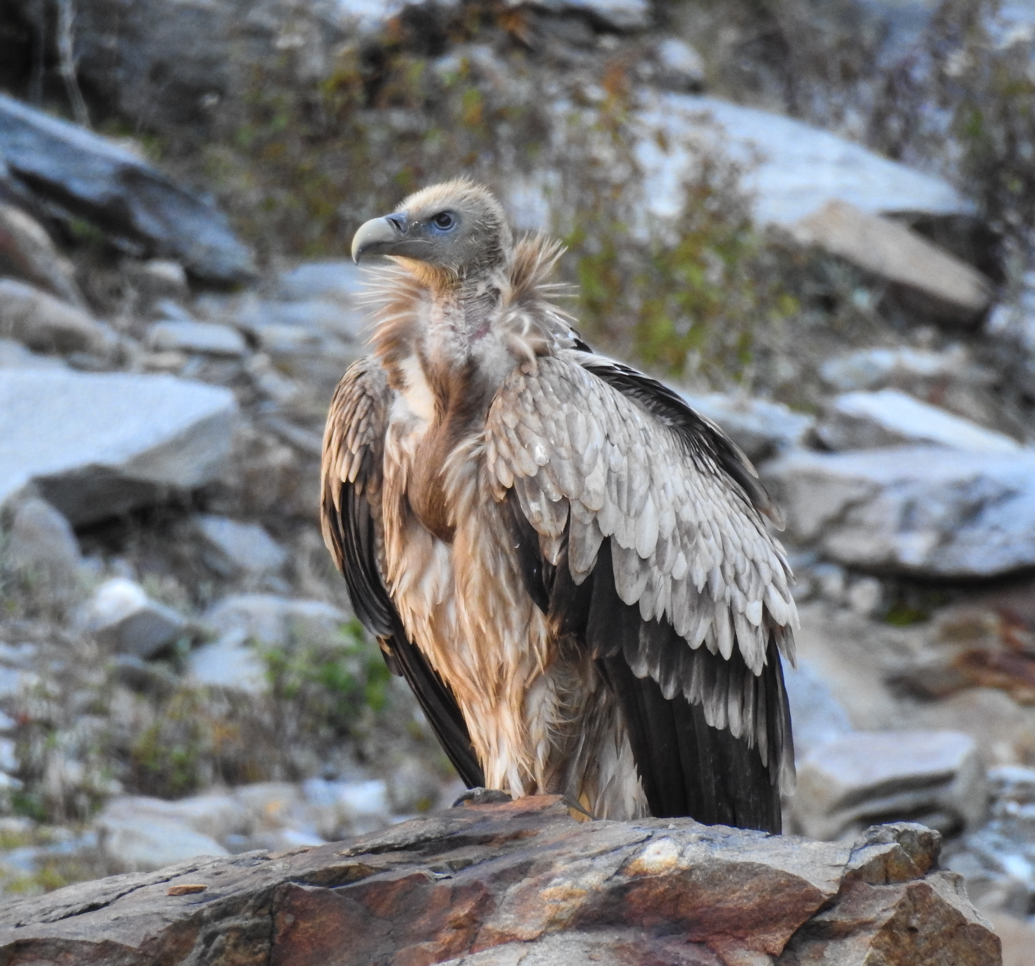
Himalayan vulture

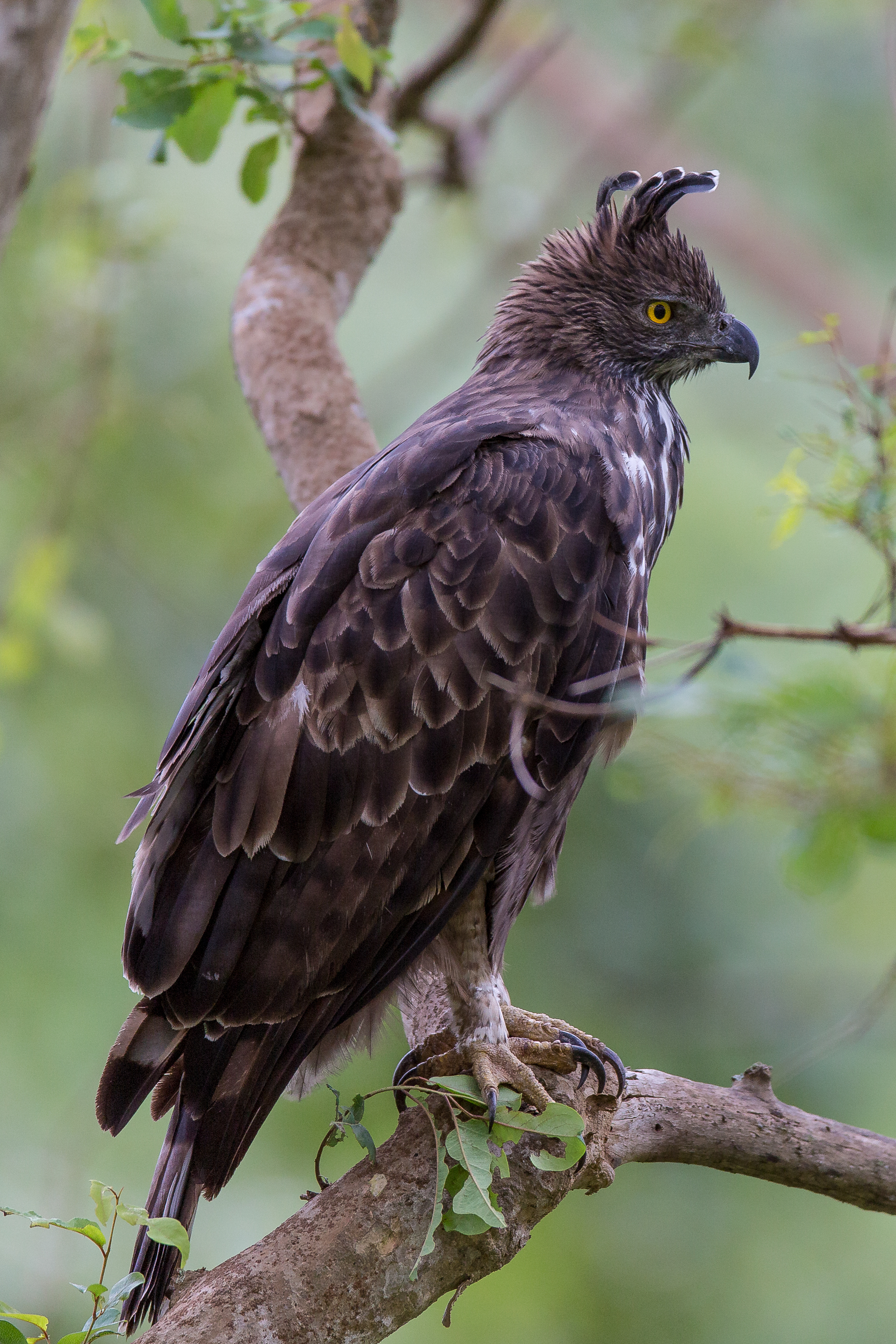
Crested hawk eagle

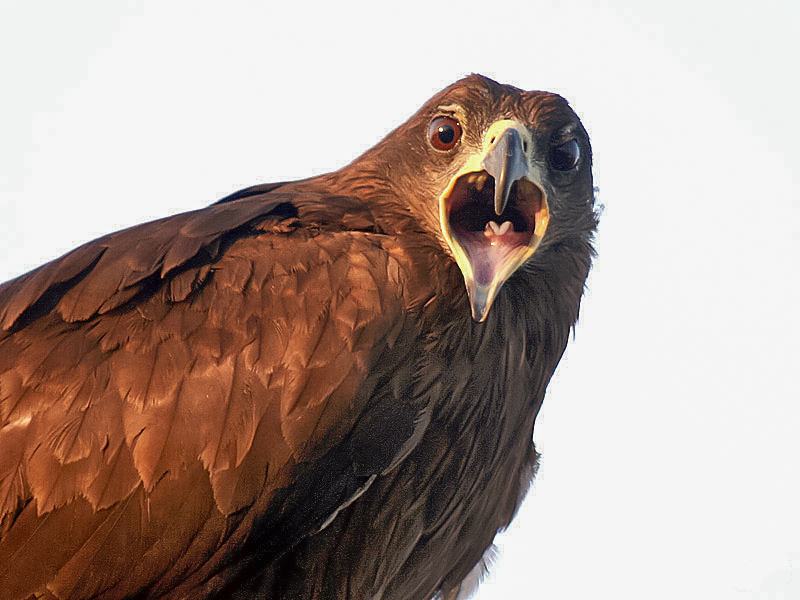
Black kite

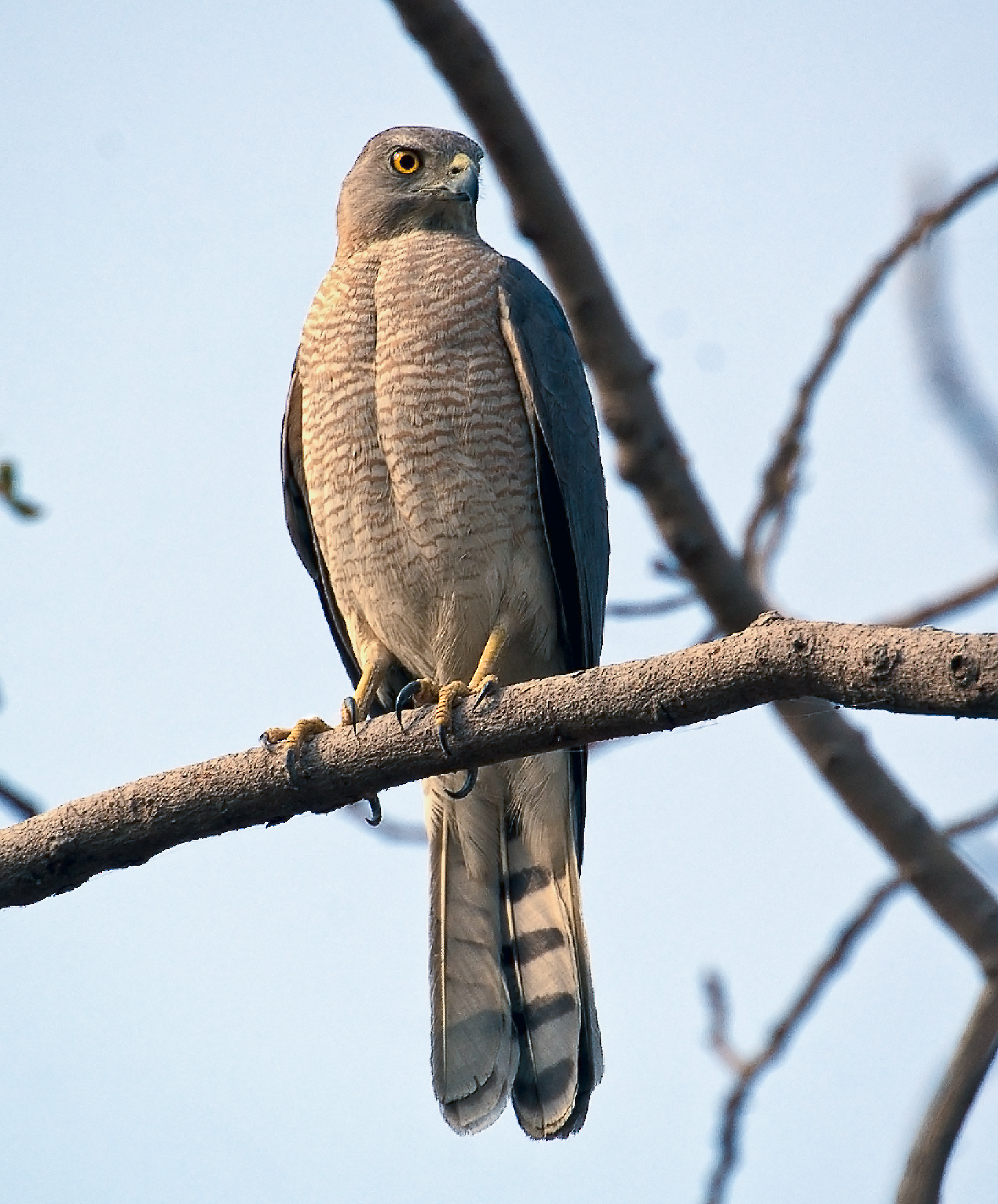
Shikra

Order: Accipitriformes Family: Accipitridae

Accipitridae is a family of birds of prey, which includes hawks, eagles, kites, harriers and Old World vultures. These birds have powerful hooked beaks for tearing flesh from their prey, strong legs, powerful talons and keen eyesight.

Common name	Binomial	Comments
Black-winged kite	Elanus caeruleus	
Bearded vulture	Gypaetus barbatus	Near threatened
Egyptian vulture	Neophron percnopterus	Endangered
European honey buzzard	Pernis apivorus	(V)
Crested honey buzzard	Pernis ptilorhynchus	
Jerdon's baza	Aviceda jerdoni	
Black baza	Aviceda leuphotes	
White-rumped vulture	Gyps bengalensis	Critically endangered
Indian vulture	Gyps indicus	Critically endangered
Slender-billed vulture	Gyps tenuirostris	Critically endangered
Himalayan vulture	Gyps himalayensis	Near threatened
Griffon vulture	Gyps fulvus	
Red-headed vulture	Sarcogyps calvus	Critically endangered
Eurasian black vulture	Aegypius monachus	Near threatened
Crested serpent eagle	Spilornis cheela	
Great Nicobar serpent eagle	Spilornis klossi	(E); endangered
Andaman serpent eagle	Spilornis elgini	(E); vulnerable
Short-toed snake eagle	Circaetus gallicus	
Changeable hawk-eagle	Nisaetus cirrhatus	(Spizaetus restricted to the neotropics by Gjershaug et al., 2008)
Mountain hawk-eagle	Nisaetus nipalensis	
Legge's hawk-eagle	Nisaetus kelaarti	
Rufous-bellied eagle	Lophotriorchis kienerii	Near threatened
Black eagle	Ictinaetus malaiensis	
Indian spotted eagle	Clanga hastata	(earlier treated as C. pomarina hastata); vulnerable
Greater spotted eagle	Clanga clanga	Vulnerable
Booted eagle	Hieraaetus pennatus	
Tawny eagle	Aquila rapax	Vulnerable
Steppe eagle	Aquila nipalensis	Endangered
Eastern imperial eagle	Aquila heliaca	Vulnerable
Golden eagle	Aquila chrysaetos	
Bonelli's eagle	Aquila fasciata	
Crested goshawk	Accipiter trivirgatus	
Shikra	Tachyspiza badia	
Nicobar sparrowhawk	Tachyspiza butleri	(E); vulnerable
Levant sparrowhawk	Tachyspiza brevipes	(V)
Chinese sparrowhawk	Tachyspiza soloensis	(V)
Japanese sparrowhawk	Tachyspiza gularis	
Besra	Tachyspiza virgatus	
Eurasian sparrowhawk	Accipiter nisus	
Eurasian goshawk	Astur gentilis	
Western marsh harrier	Circus aeruginosus	
Eastern marsh harrier	Circus spilonotus	(V)
Hen harrier	Circus cyaneus	
Pallid harrier	Circus macrourus	Near threatened
Pied harrier	Circus melanoleucos	
Montagu's harrier	Circus pygargus	
Red kite	Milvus milvus	(V)
Black kite	Milvus migrans	
Brahminy kite	Haliastur indus	
White-bellied sea eagle	Icthyophaga leucogaster	
Pallas's fish eagle	Haliaeetus leucoryphus	Endangered
White-tailed eagle	Haliaeetus albicilla	
Lesser fish eagle	Icthyophaga humilis	Near threatened
Grey-headed fish eagle	Icthyophaga ichthyaetus	Near threatened
White-eyed buzzard	Butastur teesa	
Rufous-winged buzzard	Butastur liventer	(V)
Grey-faced buzzard	Butastur indicus	(V)
Rough-legged buzzard	Buteo lagopus	(V)
Upland buzzard	Buteo hemilasius	
Himalayan buzzard	Buteo refectus	
Long-legged buzzard	Buteo rufinus	
Common buzzard	Buteo buteo	(race vulpinus)

== Barn owls ==
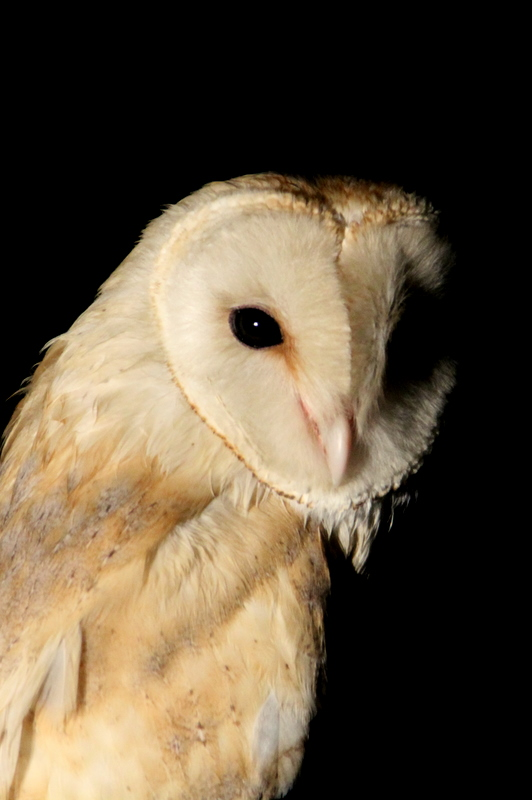
Barn owl

Order: Strigiformes Family: Tytonidae

Barn owls are medium to large owls with large heads and characteristic heart-shaped faces. They have long strong legs with powerful talons.

Common name	Binomial	Comments
Eastern barn owl	Tyto javanica	
Andaman masked owl	Tyto deroepstorffi	(E)
Eastern grass owl	Tyto longimembris	
Oriental bay owl	Phodilus badius	
Sri Lanka bay owl	Phodilus assimilis	Western Ghats subspecies ripleyi in India with nominate form in Sri Lanka

== Owls ==
Order: Strigiformes Family: Strigidae

The typical owls are small to large solitary nocturnal birds of prey. They have large forward-facing eyes and ears, a hawk-like beak and a conspicuous circle of feathers around each eye called a facial disk.

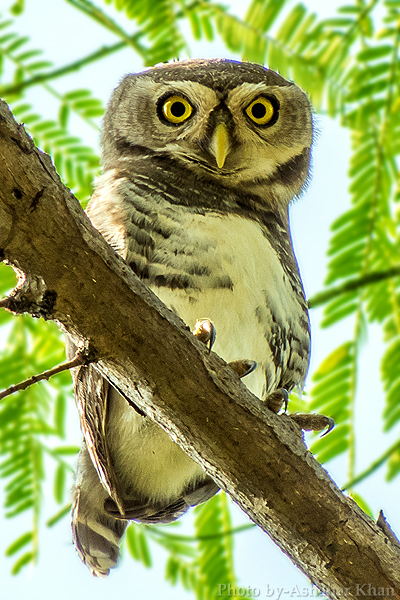
Forest owlet

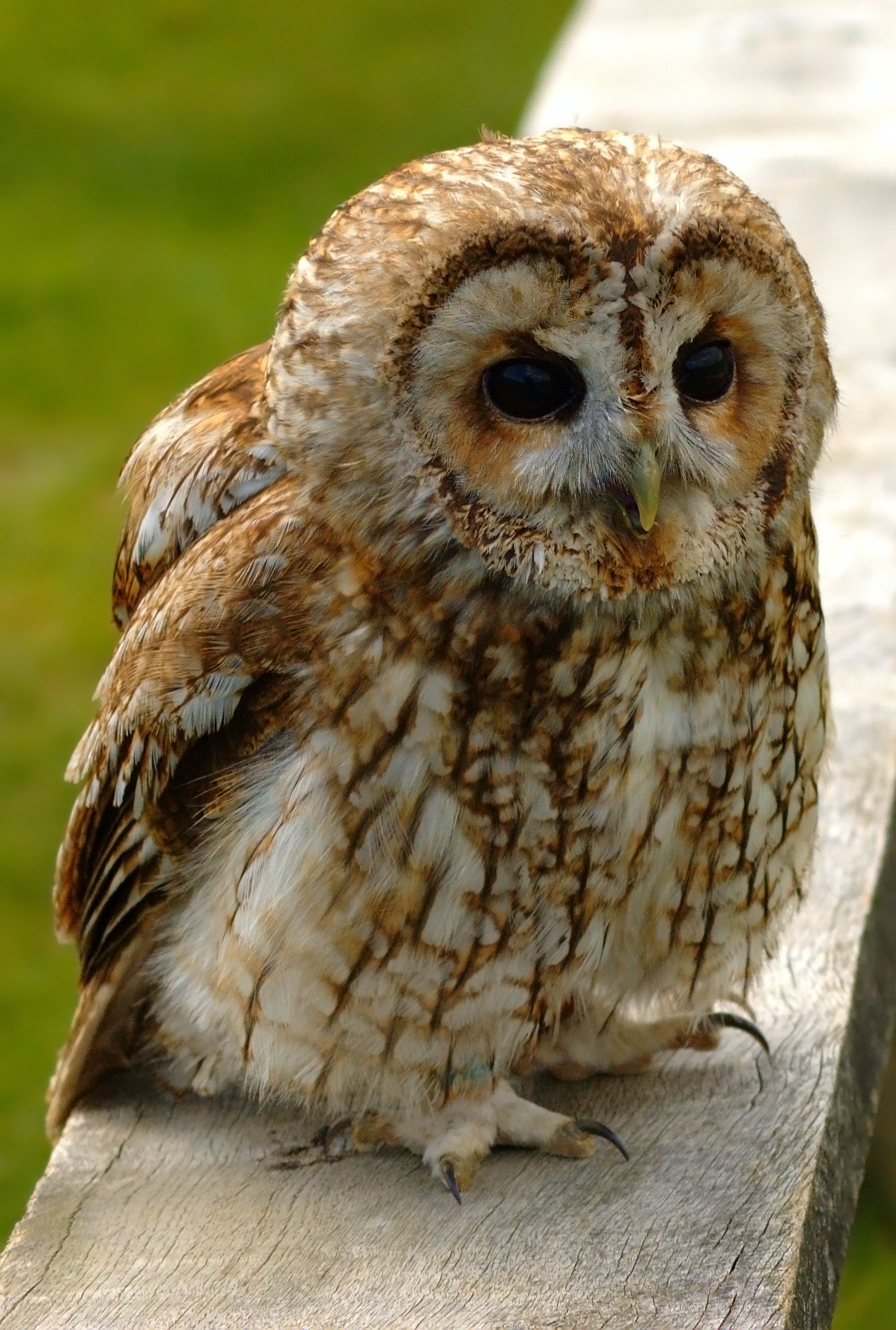
Tawny owl

Common name	Binomial	Comments
Andaman scops owl	Otus balli	(E)
Mountain scops owl	Otus spilocephalus	
Indian scops owl	Otus bakkamoena	
Collared scops owl	Otus lettia	
Pallid scops owl	Otus brucei	(V)
Eurasian scops owl	Otus scops	
Oriental scops owl	Otus sunia	
Nicobar scops owl	Otus alius	(E); near threatened
Eurasian eagle-owl	Bubo bubo	
Indian eagle-owl	Bubo bengalensis	
Spot-bellied eagle-owl	Bubo nipalensis	
Dusky eagle-owl	Bubo coromandus	
Brown fish owl	Ketupa zeylonensis	
Tawny fish owl	Ketupa flavipes	
Buffy fish owl	Ketupa ketupu	
Mottled wood owl	Strix ocellata	
Brown wood owl	Strix leptogrammica	
Tawny owl	Strix aluco	
Himalayan owl	Strix nivicolum	
Collared owlet	Taenioptynx brodiei	
Asian barred owlet	Glaucidium cuculoides	
Jungle owlet	Glaucidium radiatum	
Little owl	Athene noctua	
Spotted owlet	Athene brama	
Forest owlet	Athene blewitti	(E); endangered
Boreal owl	Aegolius funereus	(V)
Brown boobook	Ninox scutulata	
Hume's boobook	Ninox obscura	(E)
Andaman boobook	Ninox affinis	(E)
Long-eared owl	Asio otus	
Short-eared owl	Asio flammeus	

== Trogons ==
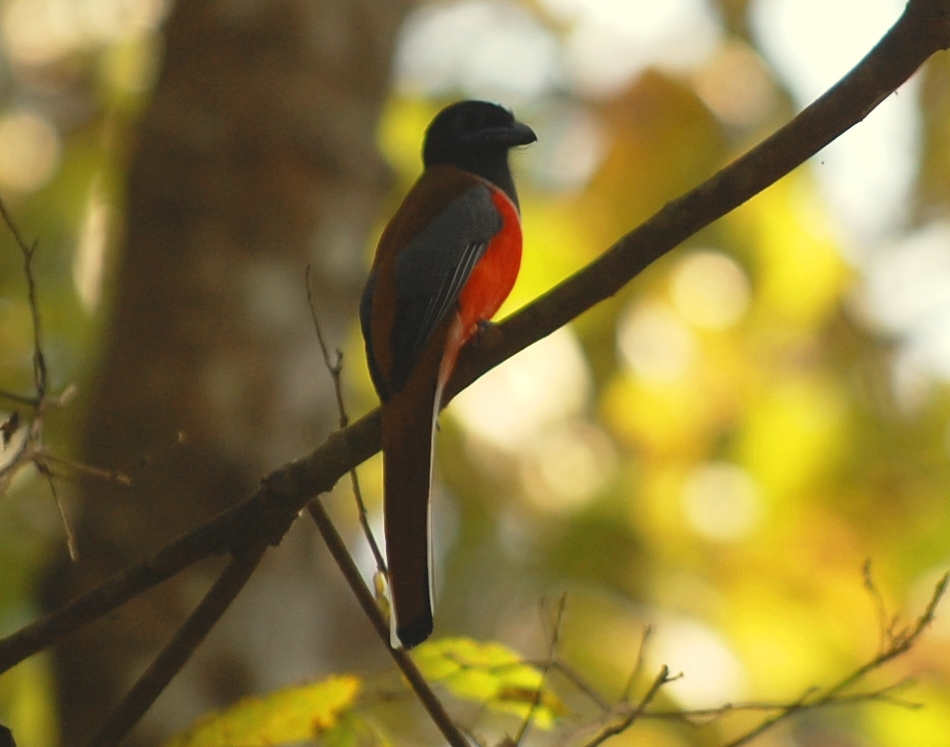
Malabar trogon

Order: Trogoniformes Family: Trogonidae

The family Trogonidae includes trogons and quetzals. Found in tropical woodlands worldwide, they feed on insects and fruit, and their broad bills and weak legs reflect their diet and arboreal habits. Although their flight is fast, they are reluctant to fly any distance. Trogons have soft, often colourful, feathers with distinctive male and female plumage. There are three species which have been recorded in India.

Common name	Binomial	Comments
Malabar trogon	Harpactes fasciatus	
Red-headed trogon	Harpactes erythrocephalus	
Ward's trogon	Harpactes wardi	

== Hoopoes ==
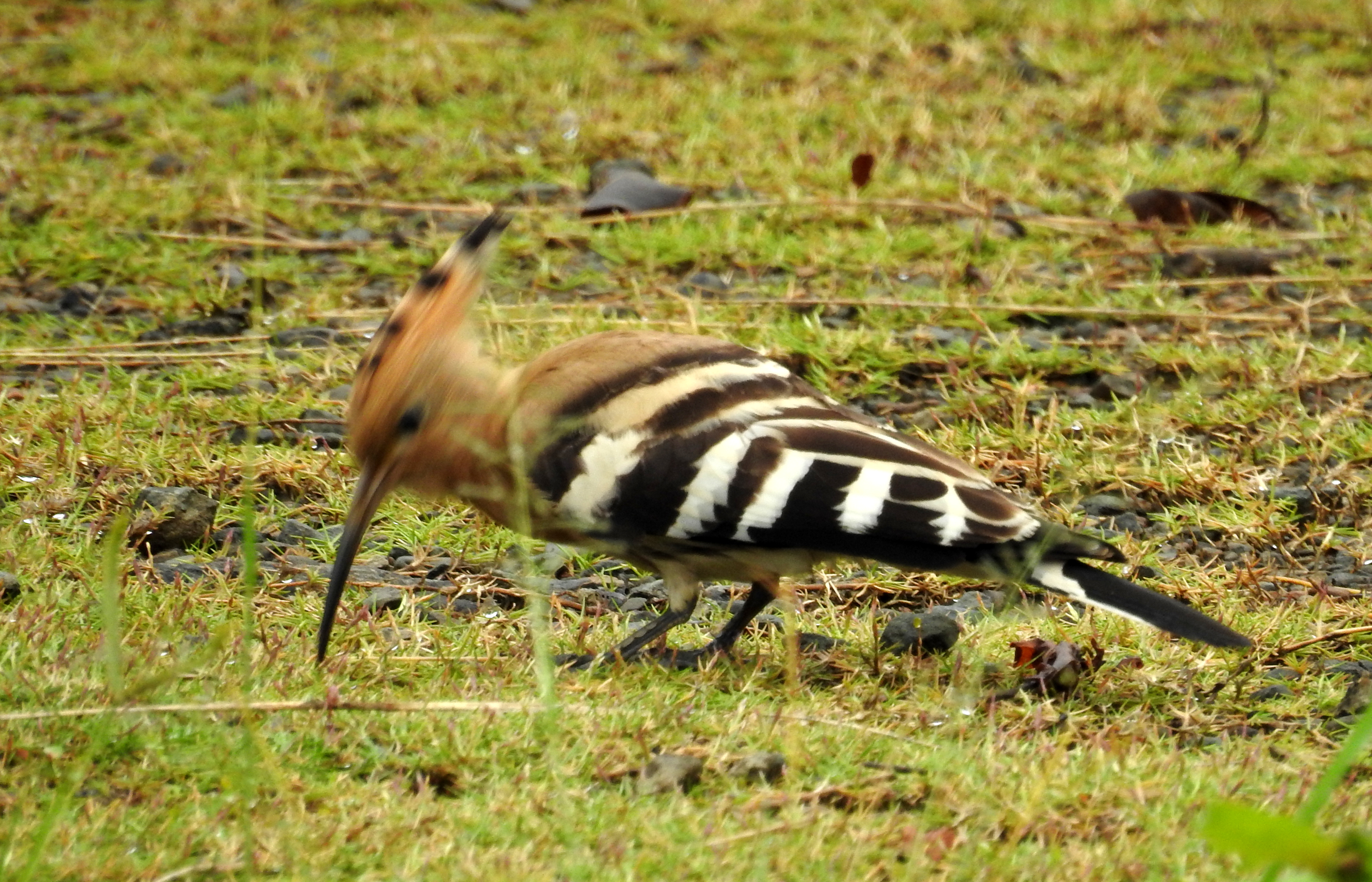
Hoopoe

Order: Bucerotiformes Family: Upupidae

Hoopoes have black, white and orangey-pink colouring with a large erectile crest on their head. There is one species which occurs in India.

Common name	Binomial	Comments
Eurasian hoopoe	Upupa epops	

== Hornbills ==
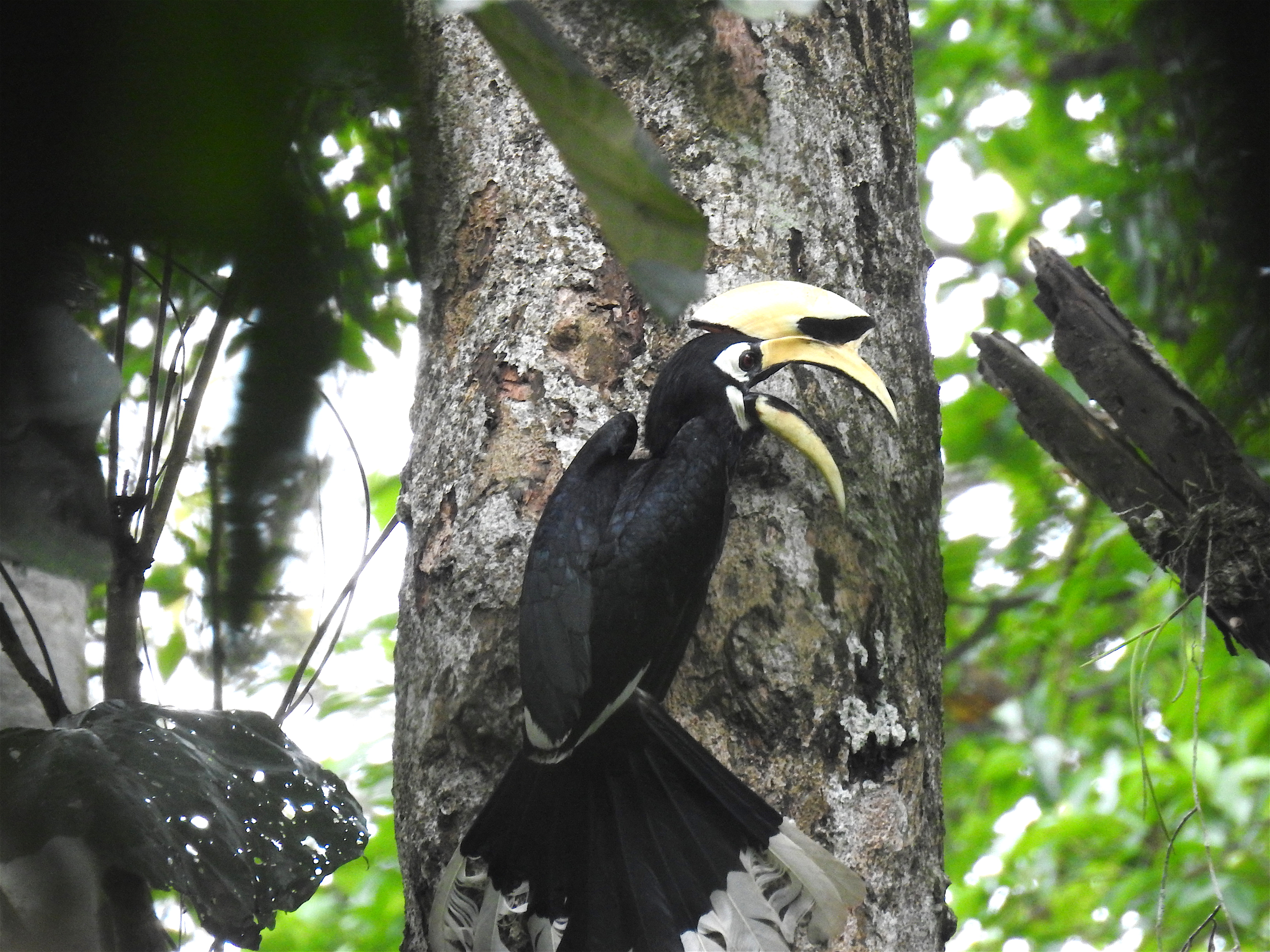
Oriental pied hornbill

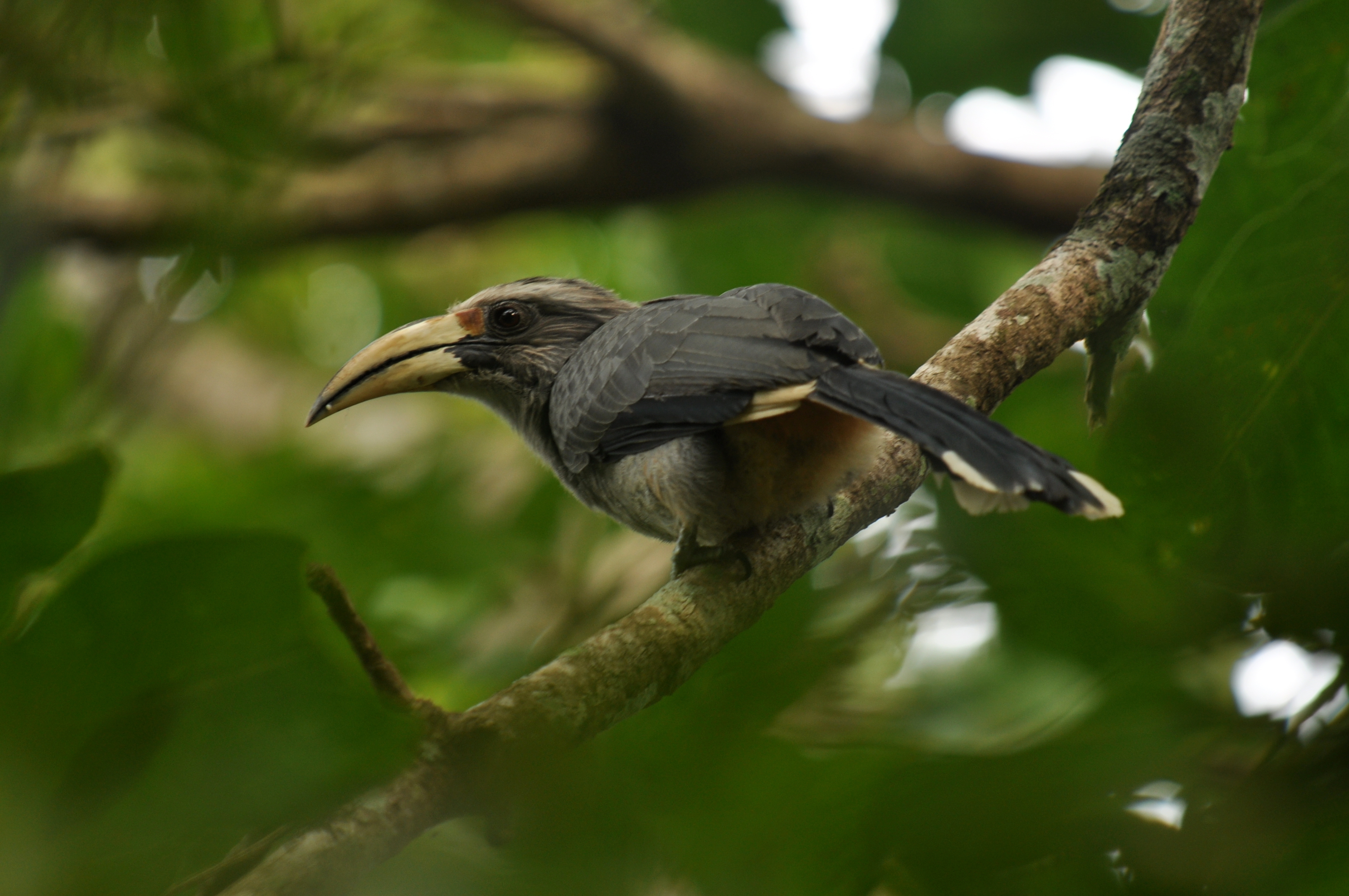
Malabar grey hornbill

Order: Bucerotiformes Family: Bucerotidae

Hornbills are a group of birds whose bill is shaped like a cow's horn, but without a twist, sometimes with a casque on the upper mandible. Frequently, the bill is brightly coloured.

Common name	Binomial	Comments
Great hornbill	Buceros bicornis	Vulnerable
Oriental pied hornbill	Anthracoceros albirostris	
Malabar pied hornbill	Anthracoceros coronatus	Near threatened
Malabar grey hornbill	Ocyceros griseus	(E); vulnerable
Indian grey hornbill	Ocyceros birostris	
Austen's brown hornbill	Anorrhinus austeni	Near threatened
Rufous-necked hornbill	Aceros nipalensis	Vulnerable
Narcondam hornbill	Rhyticeros narcondami	(E); endangered
Wreathed hornbill	Rhyticeros undulatus	Vulnerable

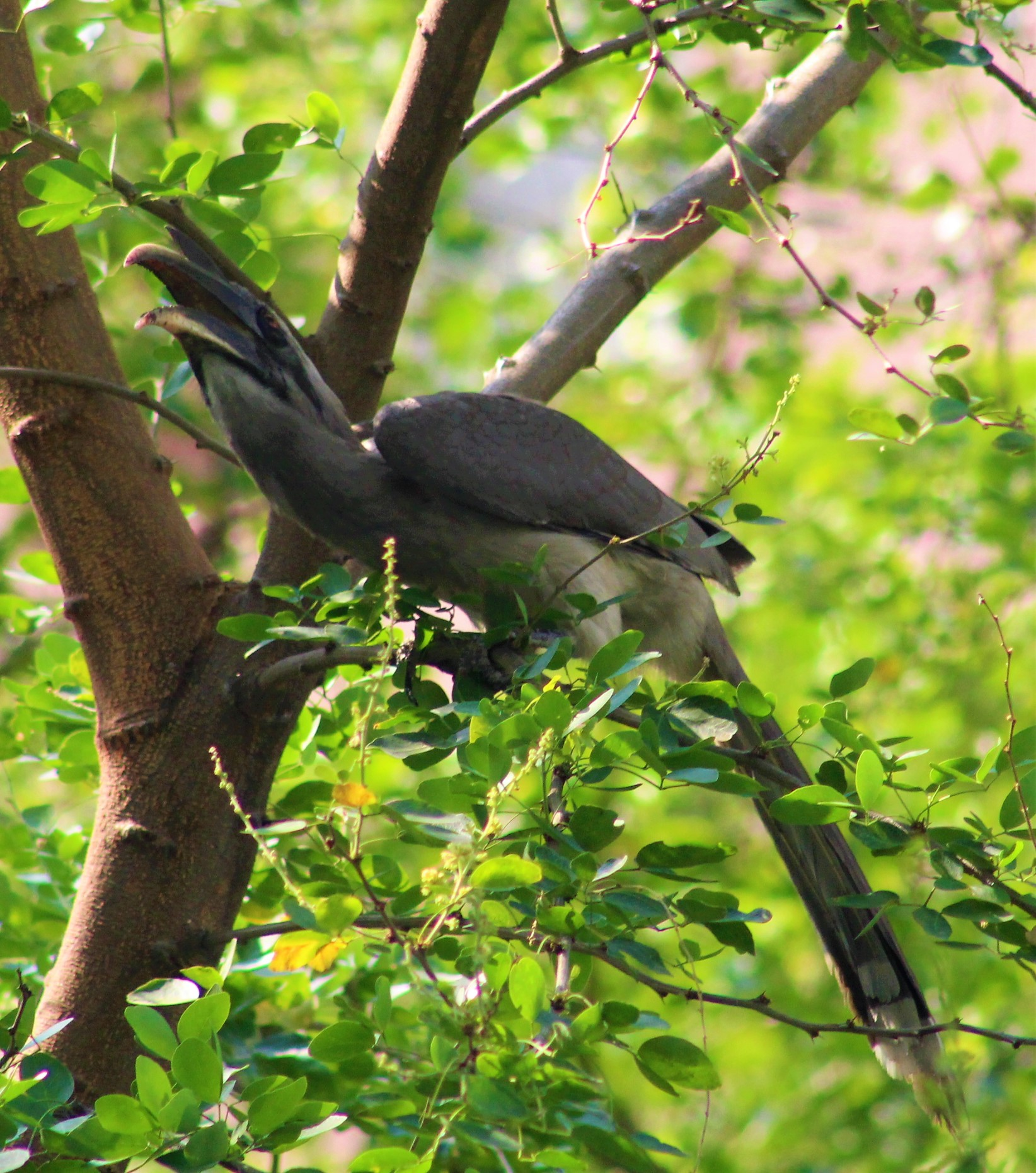
Indian grey hornbill

== Rollers ==
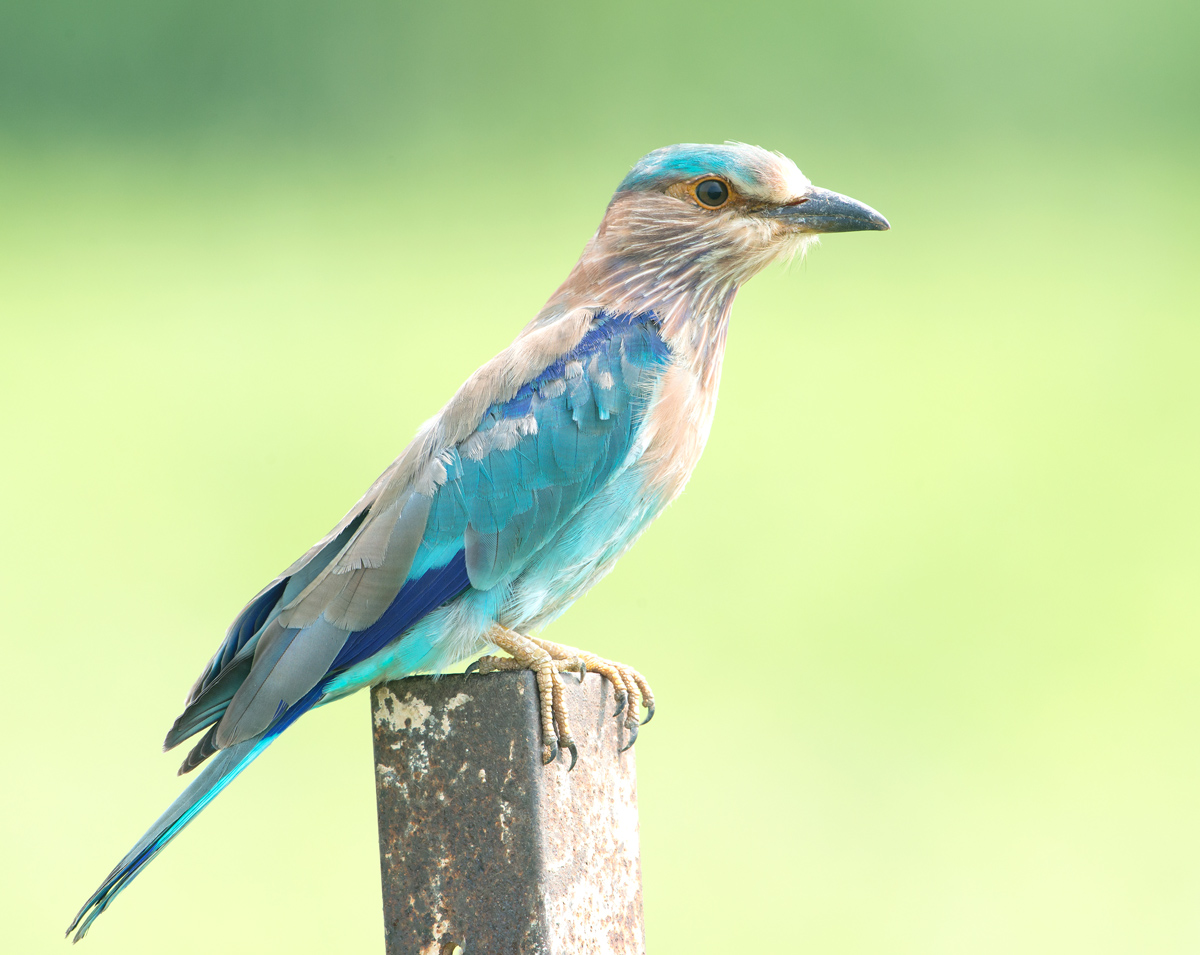
Indian roller

Order: Coraciiformes Family: Coraciidae

Rollers resemble crows in size and build, but are more closely related to the kingfishers and bee-eaters. They share the colourful appearance of those groups with blues and browns predominating. The two inner front toes are connected at the base, but the outer toe is not. There are three or four species (depending on taxonomy followed) which have been recorded in India.

Common name	Binomial	Comments
Indian roller	Coracias benghalensis	
Indochinese roller	Coracias affinis	Said to intergrade with above but distinctive in plumage in core range
European roller	Coracias garrulus	
Oriental dollarbird	Eurystomus orientalis	

== Kingfishers ==
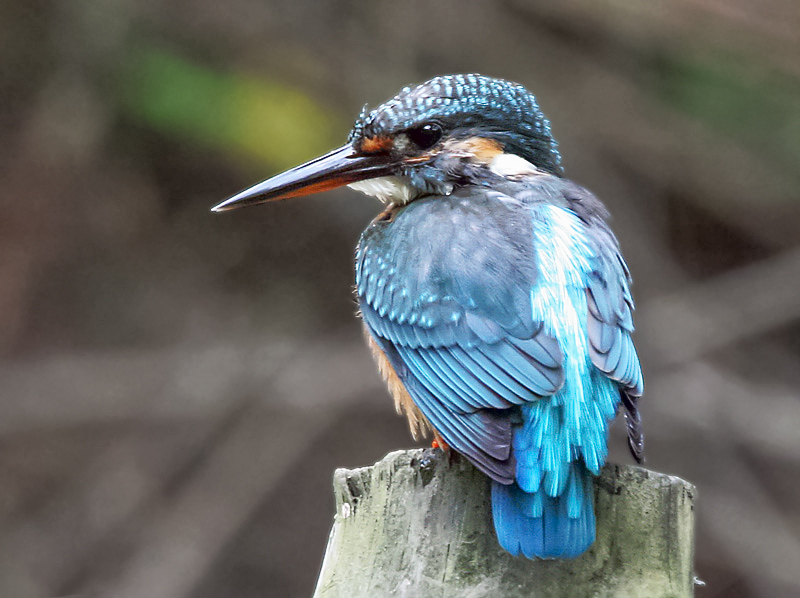
Common kingfisher

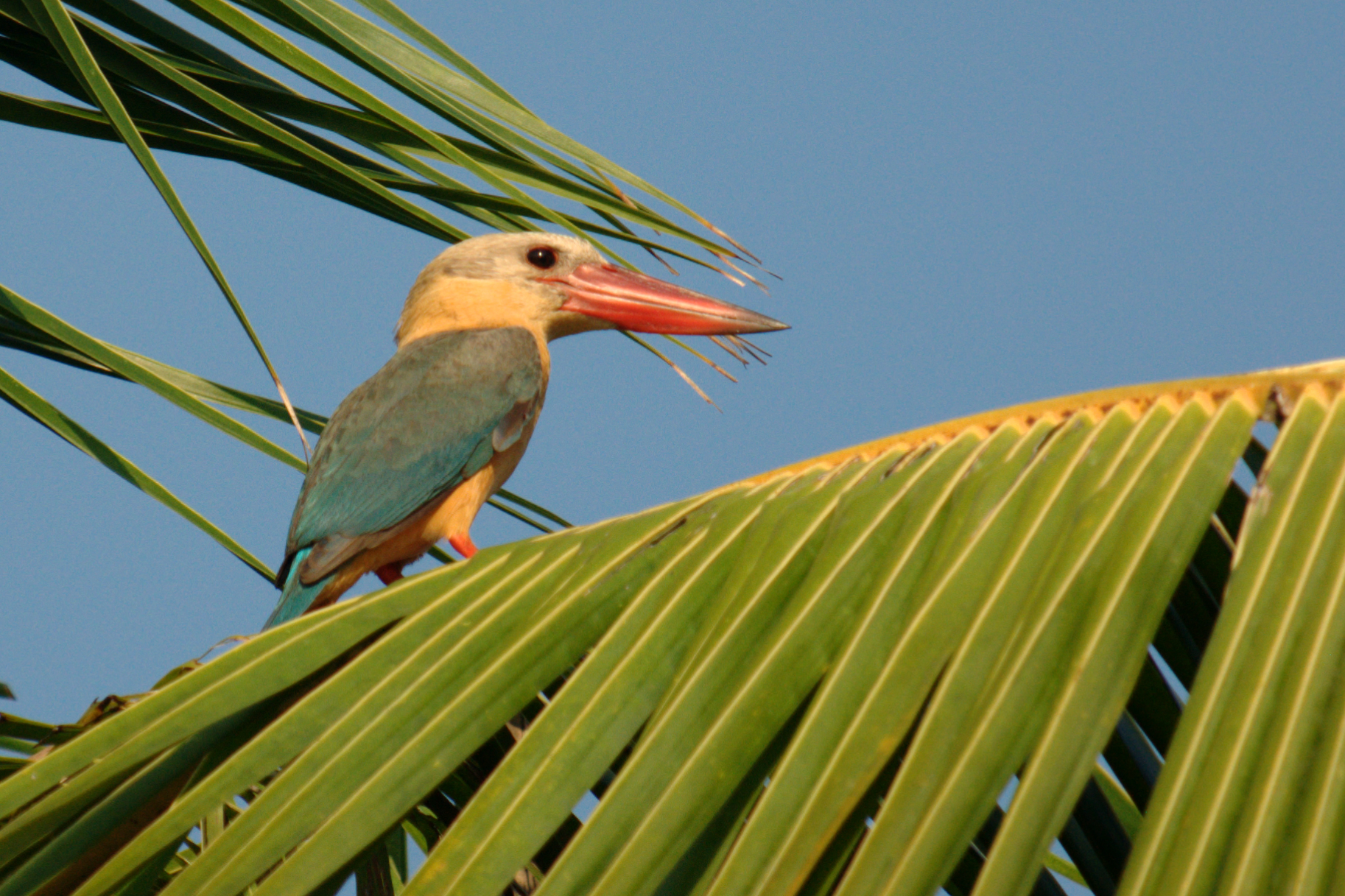
Stork-billed kingfisher

Order: Coraciiformes Family: Alcedinidae

Kingfishers are medium-sized birds with large heads, long, pointed bills, short legs and stubby tails. There are 13 species which have been recorded in India.

Common name	Binomial	Comments
Stork-billed kingfisher	Pelargopsis capensis	
Brown-winged kingfisher	Pelargopsis amauroptera	Near threatened
Ruddy kingfisher	Halcyon coromanda	
White-throated kingfisher	Halcyon smyrnensis	
Black-capped kingfisher	Halcyon pileata	Vulnerable
Collared kingfisher	Todiramphus chloris	
Blue-eared kingfisher	Alcedo meninting	
Common kingfisher	Alcedo atthis	
Blyth's kingfisher	Alcedo hercules	Near threatened
Black-backed dwarf kingfisher	Ceyx erithaca	Near threatened
Rufous-backed dwarf kingfisher	Ceyx rufidorsa	(V)
Crested kingfisher	Megaceryle lugubris	
Pied kingfisher	Ceryle rudis	

== Bee-eaters ==
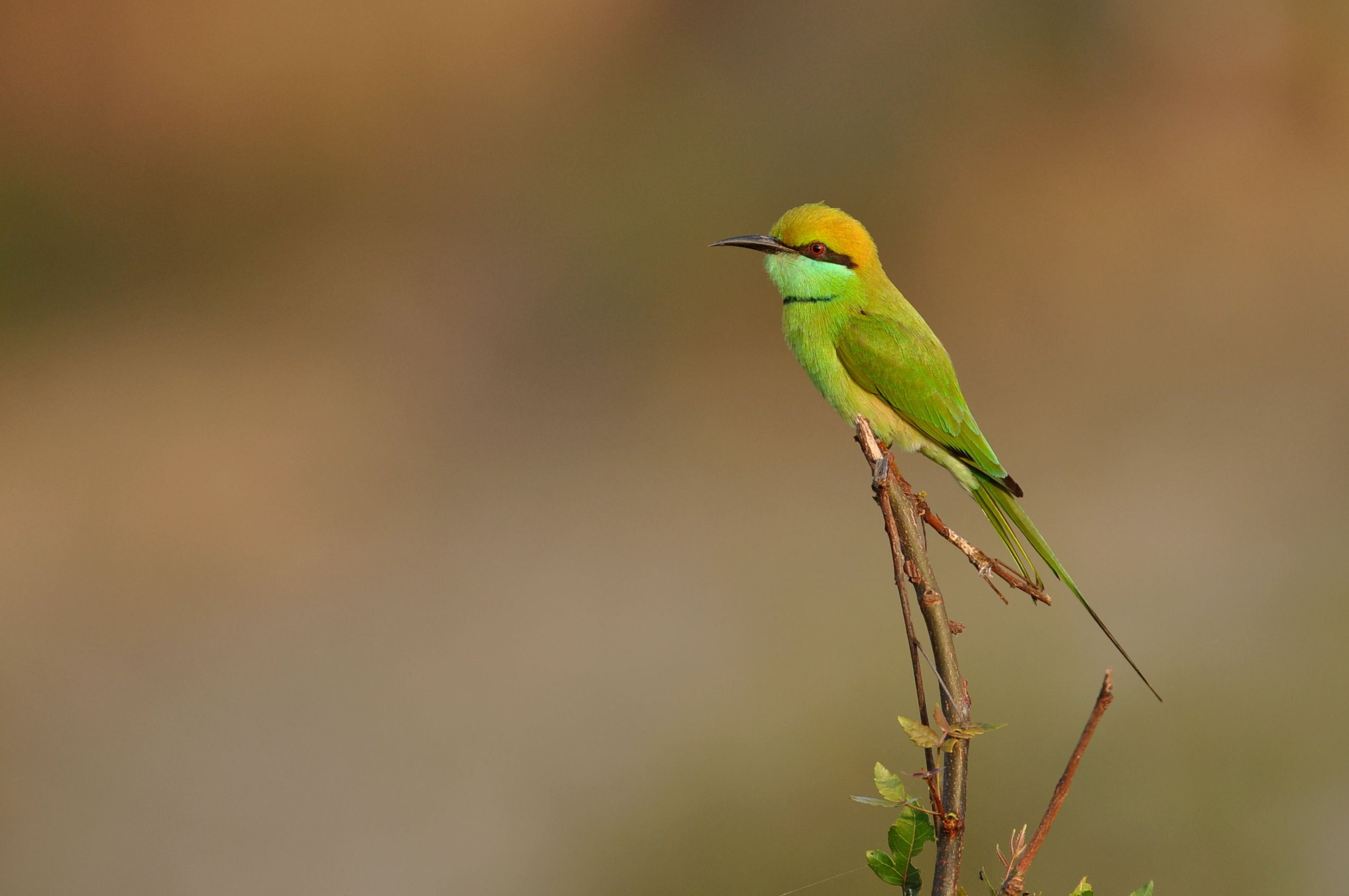
Asian green bee-eater

Order: Coraciiformes Family: Meropidae

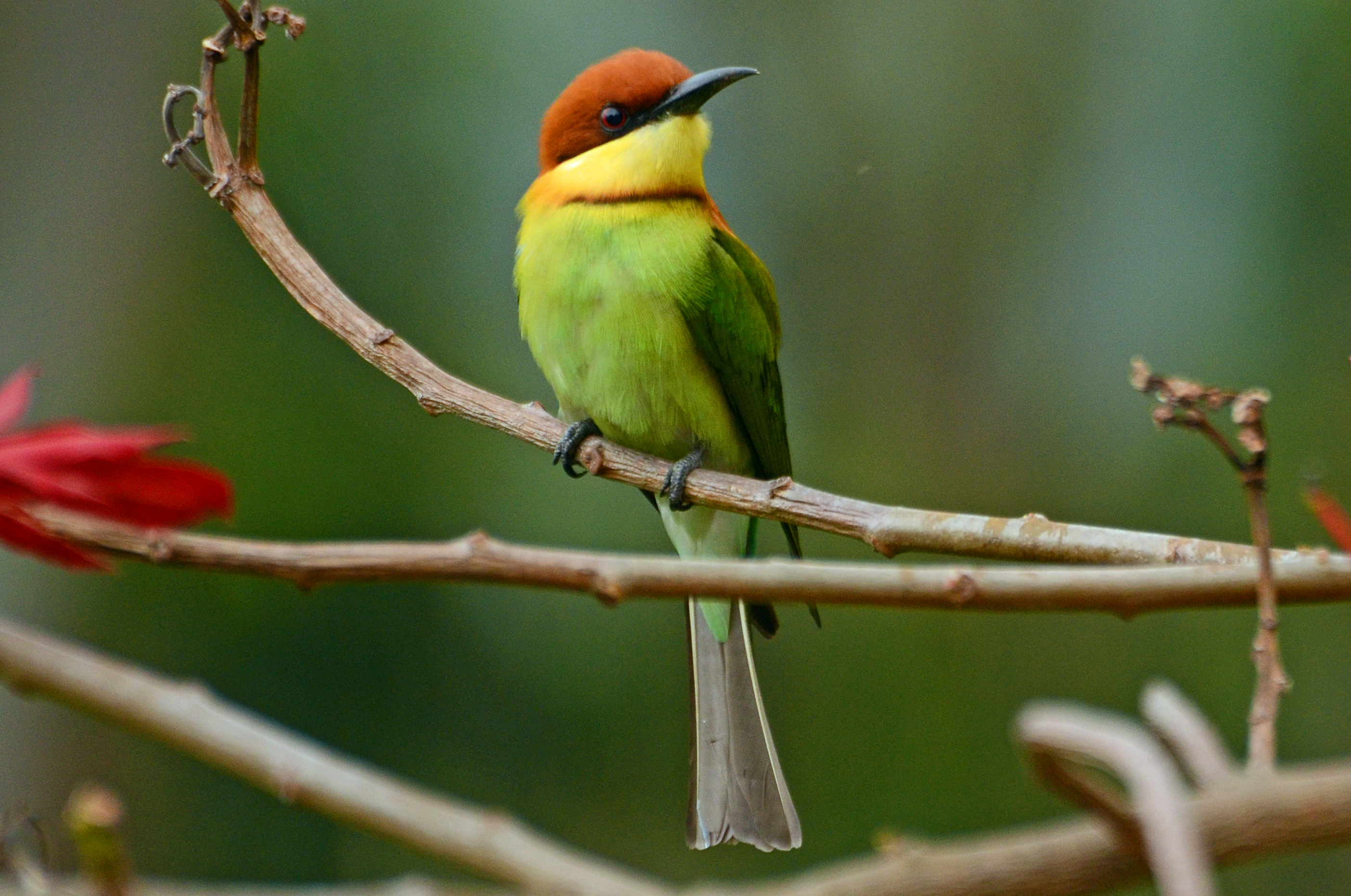
Chestnut-headed bee-eater

The bee-eaters are a group of near passerine birds in the family Meropidae. Most species are found in Africa but others occur in southern Europe, Madagascar, Australia and New Guinea. They are characterised by richly coloured plumage, slender bodies and usually elongated central tail feathers. All are colourful and have long downturned bills and pointed wings, which give them a swallow-like appearance when seen from afar. There are 7 species which have been recorded in India.

Common name	Binomial	Comments
Blue-bearded bee-eater	Nyctyornis athertoni	
Asian green bee-eater	Merops orientalis	
Blue-cheeked bee-eater	Merops persicus	
Blue-tailed bee-eater	Merops philippinus	
Blue-throated bee-eater	Merops viridis	(V)
Chestnut-headed bee-eater	Merops leschenaulti	
European bee-eater	Merops apiaster	

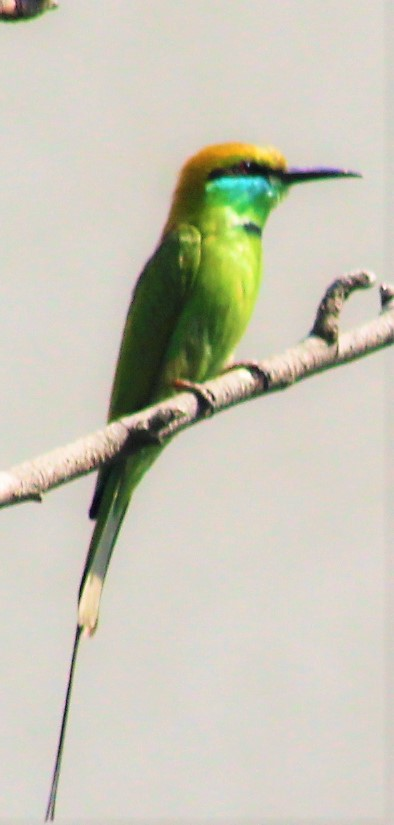
Green bee eater

== Asian barbets ==
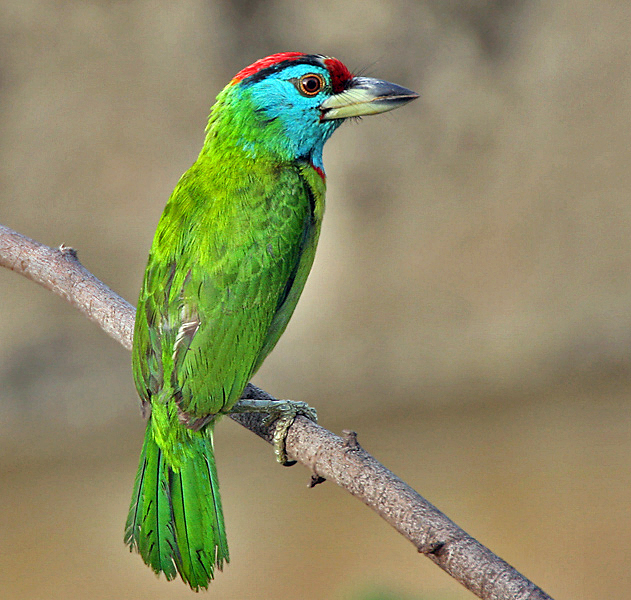
Blue-throated barbet

Order: Piciformes Family: Megalaimidae

The Asian barbets are plump birds, with short necks and large heads. They get their name from the bristles which fringe their heavy bills. Most species are brightly coloured.

Common name	Binomial	Comments
Great barbet	Psilopogon virens	
Brown-headed barbet	Psilopogon zeylanicus	
Lineated barbet	Psilopogon lineatus	
White-cheeked barbet	Psilopogon viridis	(E)
Golden-throated barbet	Psilopogon franklinii	
Blue-throated barbet	Psilopogon asiaticus	
Blue-eared barbet	Psilopogon duvaucelii	
Malabar barbet	Psilopogon malabaricus	(E)
Coppersmith barbet	Psilopogon haemacephalus	

== Honeyguides ==
Order: Piciformes Family: Indicatoridae

Honeyguides are among the few birds that feed on wax. They are named for the greater honeyguide which leads traditional honey-hunters to bees' nests and, after the hunters have harvested the honey, feeds on the remaining contents of the hive. There is one species which occurs in India.

Common name	Binomial	Comments
Yellow-rumped honeyguide	Indicator xanthonotus	

== Woodpeckers ==
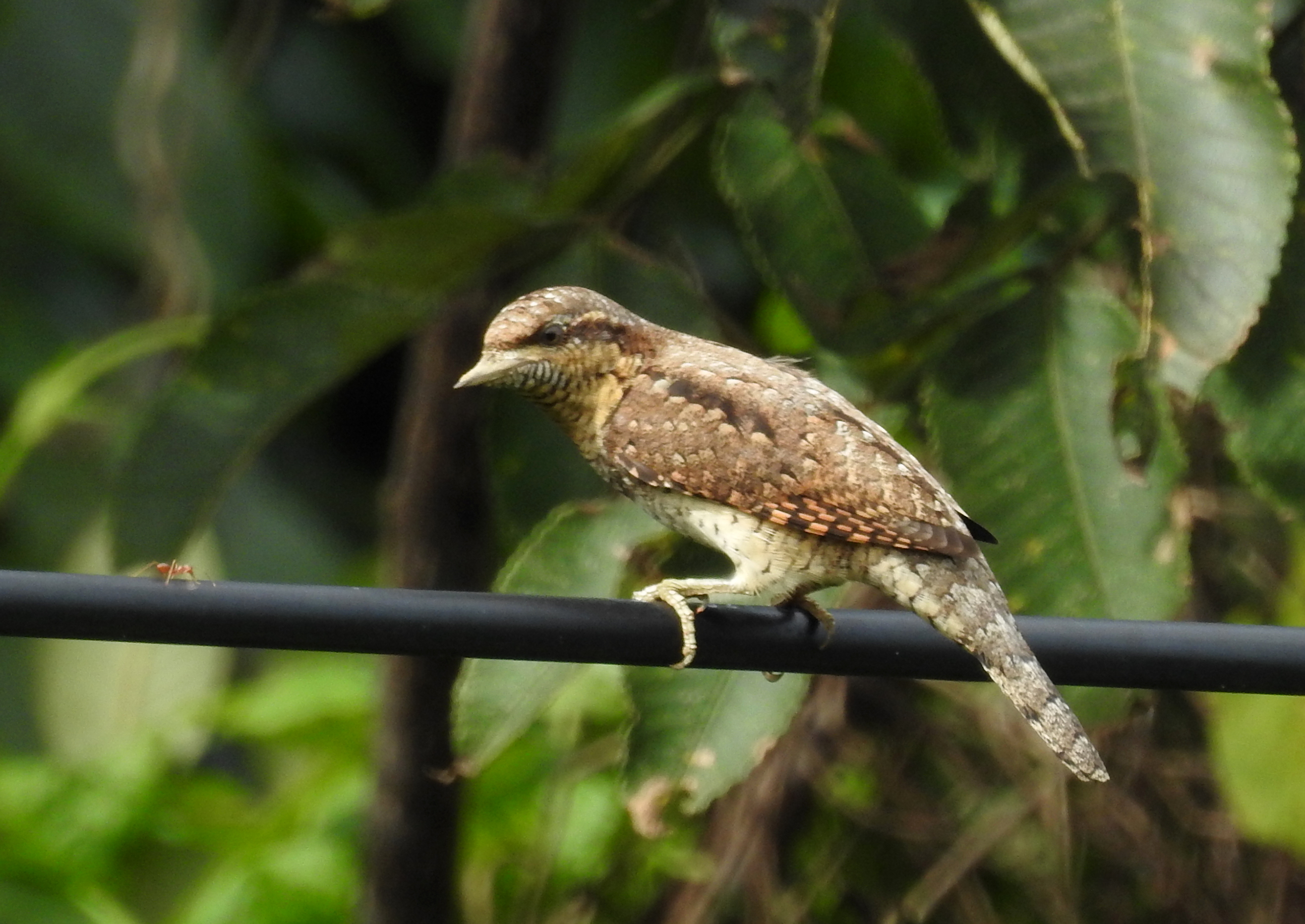
Eurasian wryneck

Order: Piciformes Family: Picidae

Woodpeckers are small to medium-sized birds with chisel-like beaks, short legs, stiff tails and long tongues used for capturing insects. Some species have feet with two toes pointing forward and two backward, while several species have only three toes. Many woodpeckers have the habit of tapping noisily on tree trunks with their beaks.

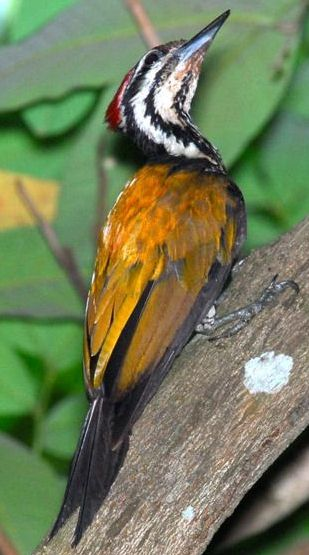
Common flameback

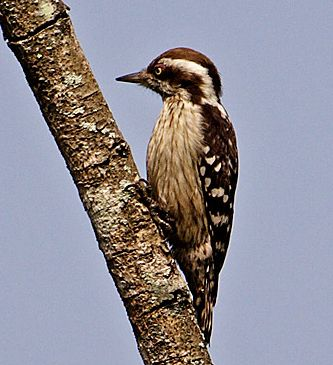
Brown-capped pygmy woodpecker

Common name	Binomial	Comments
Eurasian wryneck	Jynx torquilla	
Speckled piculet	Picumnus innominatus	
White-browed piculet	Sasia ochracea	
Heart-spotted woodpecker	Hemicircus canente	
Brown-capped pygmy woodpecker	Yungipicus nanus	
Grey-capped pygmy woodpecker	Yungipicus canicapillus	
Brown-fronted woodpecker	Dendrocoptes auriceps	
Yellow-crowned woodpecker	Leiopicus mahrattensis	
Crimson-naped woodpecker	Dryobates cathpharius	
Rufous-bellied woodpecker	Dendrocopos hyperythrus	
Fulvous-breasted woodpecker	Dendrocopos macei	
Freckle-breasted woodpecker	Dendrocopos analis	
Stripe-breasted woodpecker	Dendrocopos atratus	
Darjeeling woodpecker	Dendrocopos darjellensis	
Himalayan woodpecker	Dendrocopos himalayensis	
Sind woodpecker	Dendrocopos assimilis	
Great spotted woodpecker	Dendrocopos major	
White-bellied woodpecker	Dryocopus javensis	
Andaman woodpecker	Dryocopus hodgei	(E); vulnerable
Greater yellownape	Chrysophlegma flavinucha	
Lesser yellownape	Picus chlorolophus	
Streak-throated woodpecker	Picus xanthopygaeus	
Scaly-bellied woodpecker	Picus squamatus	
Grey-headed woodpecker	Picus canus	
Himalayan flameback	Dinopium shorii	
Common flameback	Dinopium javanense	
Black-rumped flameback	Dinopium benghalense	
Greater flameback	Chrysocolaptes guttacristatus	
Malabar flameback	Chrysocolaptes socialis	(E)
White-naped woodpecker	Chrysocolaptes festivus	
Pale-headed woodpecker	Gecinulus grantia	
Bay woodpecker	Blythipicus pyrrhotis	
Rufous woodpecker	Micropternus brachyurus	
Great slaty woodpecker	Mulleripicus pulverulentus	Vulnerable

== Caracaras and falcons ==
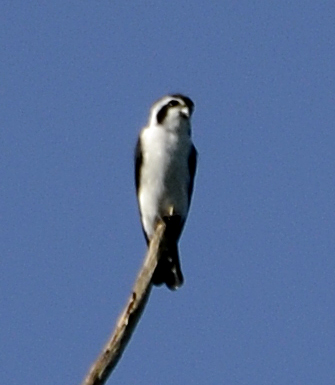
Pied falconet

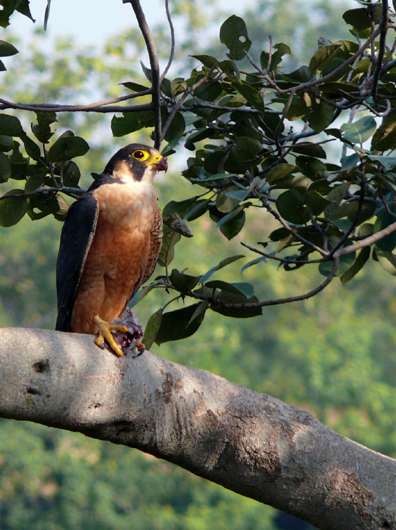
Peregrine falcon

Order: Falconiformes Family: Falconidae

Falconidae is a family of diurnal birds of prey. They differ from hawks, eagles and kites in that they kill with their beaks instead of their talons. There are thirteen species which have been recorded in India.

Common name	Binomial	Comments
Collared falconet	Microhierax caerulescens	
Pied falconet	Microhierax melanoleucos	
Lesser kestrel	Falco naumanni	
Common kestrel	Falco tinnunculus	
Red-necked falcon	Falco chicquera	
Red-footed falcon	Falco vespertinus	(V); vulnerable
Amur falcon	Falco amurensis	
Merlin	Falco columbarius	
Eurasian hobby	Falco subbuteo	
Oriental hobby	Falco severus	
Laggar falcon	Falco jugger	Near threatened
Saker falcon	Falco cherrug	Endangered
Peregrine falcon	Falco peregrinus	

== Old World parrots ==
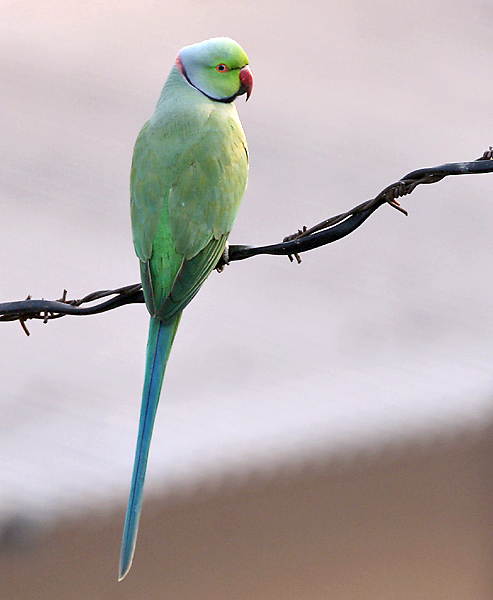
Rose-ringed parakeet

Order: Psittaciformes Family: Psittaculidae

Characteristic features of parrots include a strong curved bill, an upright stance, strong legs, and clawed zygodactyl feet. Many parrots are vividly coloured, and some are multi-coloured. In size they range from 8 cm (3.1 in) to 1 m (3.3 ft) in length. Old World parrots are found from Africa east across south and southeast Asia and Oceania to Australia and New Zealand.

Common name	Binomial	Comments
Grey-headed parakeet	Psittacula finschii	Near threatened
Slaty-headed parakeet	Psittacula himalayana	
Blossom-headed parakeet	Psittacula roseata	Near threatened
Plum-headed parakeet	Psittacula cyanocephala	
Red-breasted parakeet	Psittacula alexandri	Near threatened
Lord Derby's parakeet	Psittacula derbiana	Near threatened
Long-tailed parakeet	Psittacula longicauda	Vulnerable
Blue-winged parakeet	Psittacula columboides	(E)
Alexandrine parakeet	Psittacula eupatria	Near threatened
Rose-ringed parakeet	Psittacula krameri	
Nicobar parakeet	Psittacula caniceps	(E); near threatened
Vernal hanging parrot	Loriculus vernalis	

== Typical broadbills ==
Order: Passeriformes Family: Eurylaimidae

The broadbills are small, brightly coloured birds, which feed on fruit and also take insects in flycatcher fashion, snapping their broad bills. Their habitat is canopies of wet forests. There are two species which have been recorded in India.

Common name	Binomial	Comments
Long-tailed broadbill	Psarisomus dalhousiae	
Grey-lored broadbill	Serilophus rubropygius	

== Pittas ==
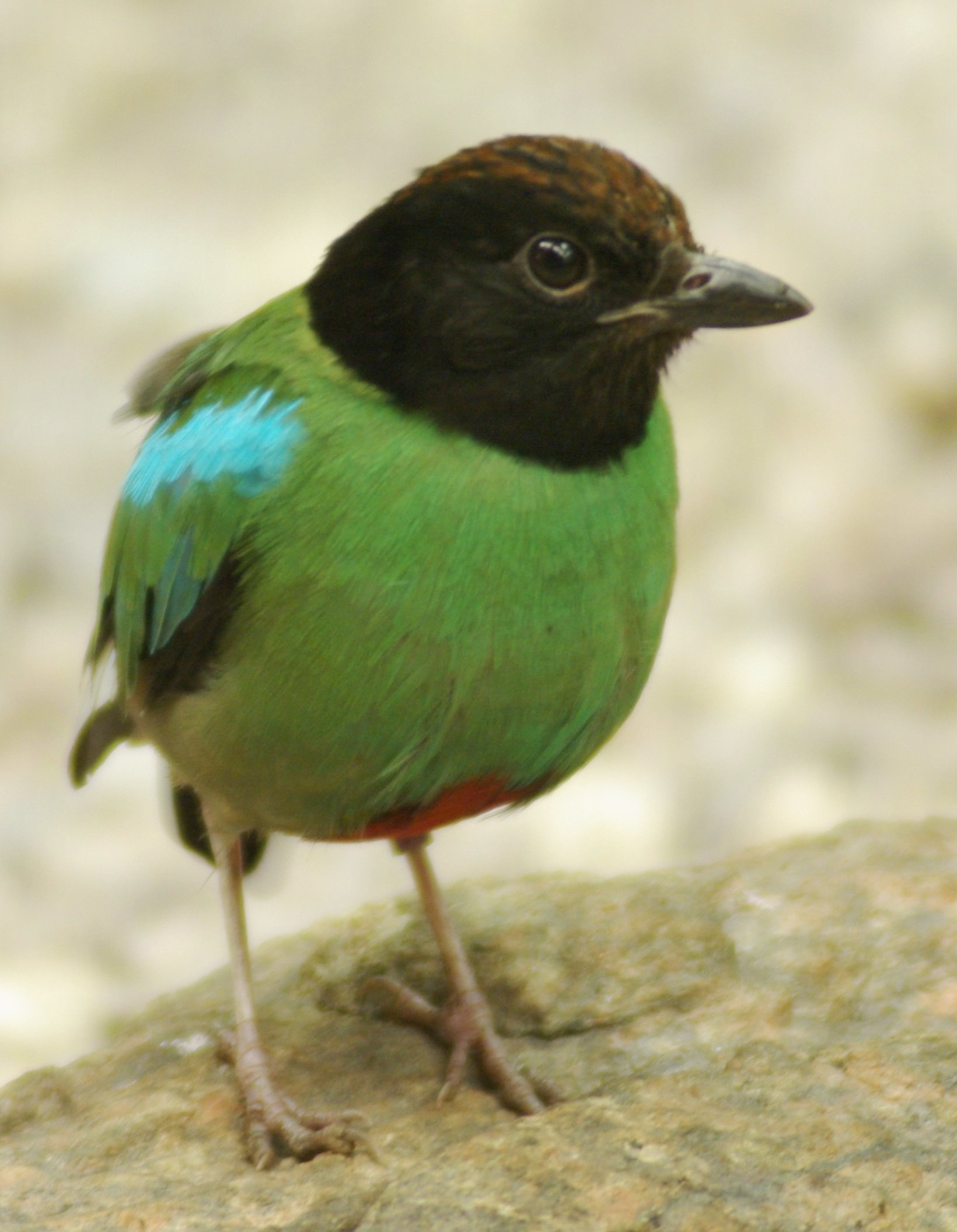
Hooded pitta

Order: Passeriformes Family: Pittidae

Pittas are medium-sized by passerine standards and are stocky, with fairly long, strong legs, short tails and stout bills. Many are brightly coloured. They spend the majority of their time on wet forest floors, eating snails, insects and similar invertebrates.

Common name	Binomial	Comments
Blue-naped pitta	Hydrornis nipalensis	
Blue pitta	Hydrornis cyanea	
Indian pitta	Pitta brachyura	
Blue-winged pitta	Pitta moluccensis	(V)
Mangrove pitta	Pitta megarhyncha	near threatened
Western hooded pitta	Pitta sordida	
Nicobar hooded pitta	Pitta abbotti	(E)

== Vangas, helmetshrikes, woodshrikes, and shrike-flycatchers ==
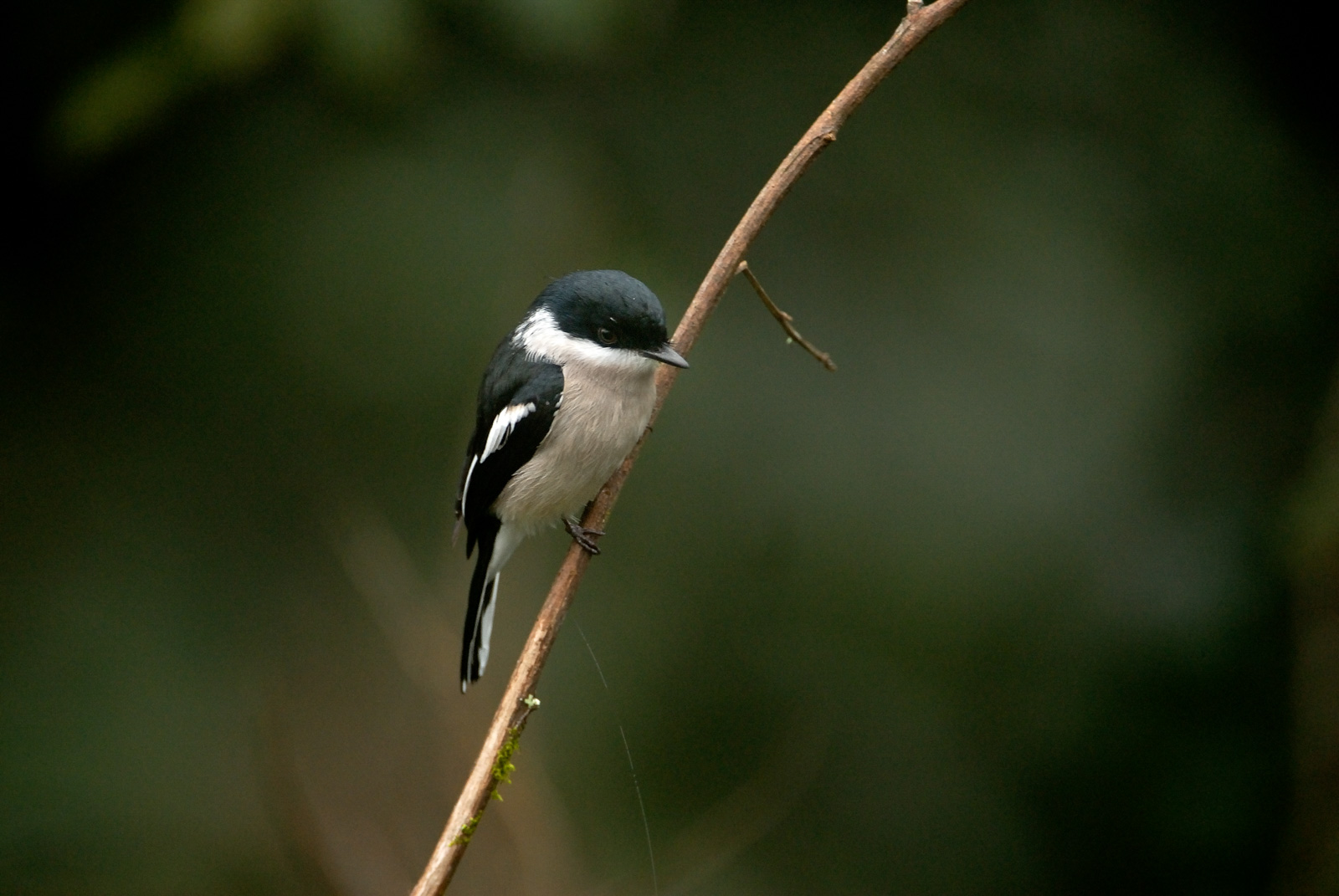
Bar-winged flycatcher-shrike

Order: Passeriformes Family: Vangidae

The woodshrikes are similar in build to the shrikes.

Common name	Binomial	Comments
Bar-winged flycatcher-shrike	Hemipus picatus	
Large woodshrike	Tephrodornis virgatus	
Malabar woodshrike	Tephrodornis sylvicola	(E)
Common woodshrike	Tephrodornis pondicerianus	

== Woodswallows, butcherbirds, and peltops ==
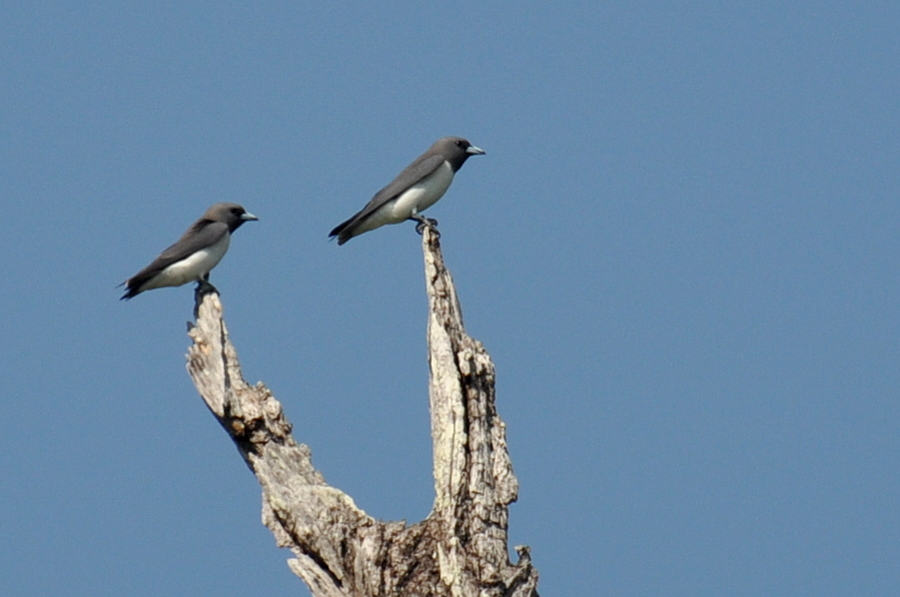
White-breasted woodswallow

Order: Passeriformes Family: Artamidae

The woodswallows are soft-plumaged, somber-coloured passerine birds. They are smooth, agile flyers with moderately large, semi-triangular wings. There are two species which have been recorded in India.

Common name	Binomial	Comments
Ashy woodswallow	Artamus fuscus	
White-breasted woodswallow	Artamus leucorynchus	

== Ioras ==
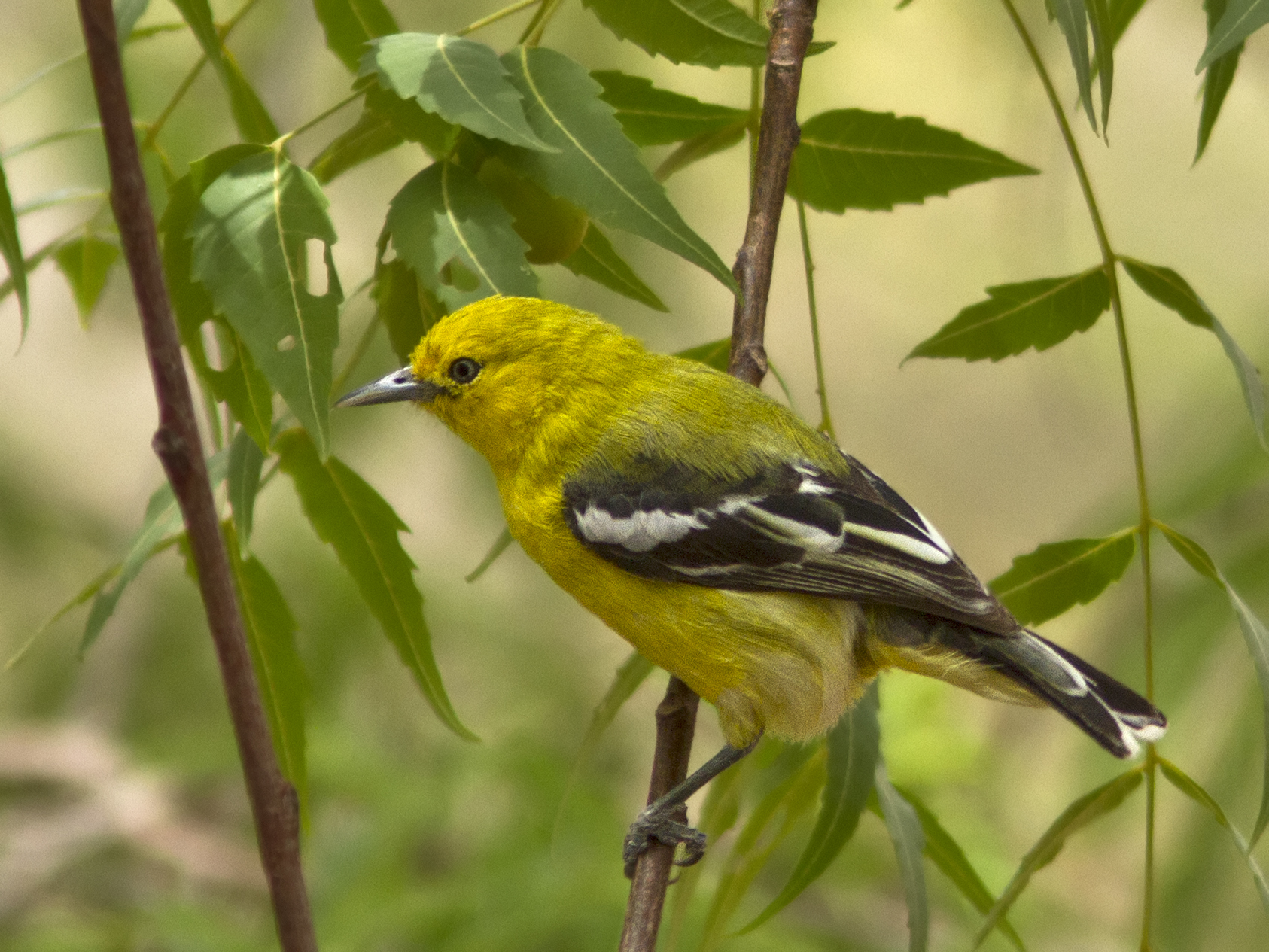
White-tailed iora female

Order: Passeriformes Family: Aegithinidae

The ioras are bulbul-like birds of open forest or thorn scrub, but whereas that group tends to be drab in colouration, ioras are sexually dimorphic, with the males being brightly plumaged in yellows and greens. There are two species which have been recorded in India.

Common name	Binomial	Comments
Common iora	Aegithina tiphia	
Marshall's iora	Aegithina nigrolutea	

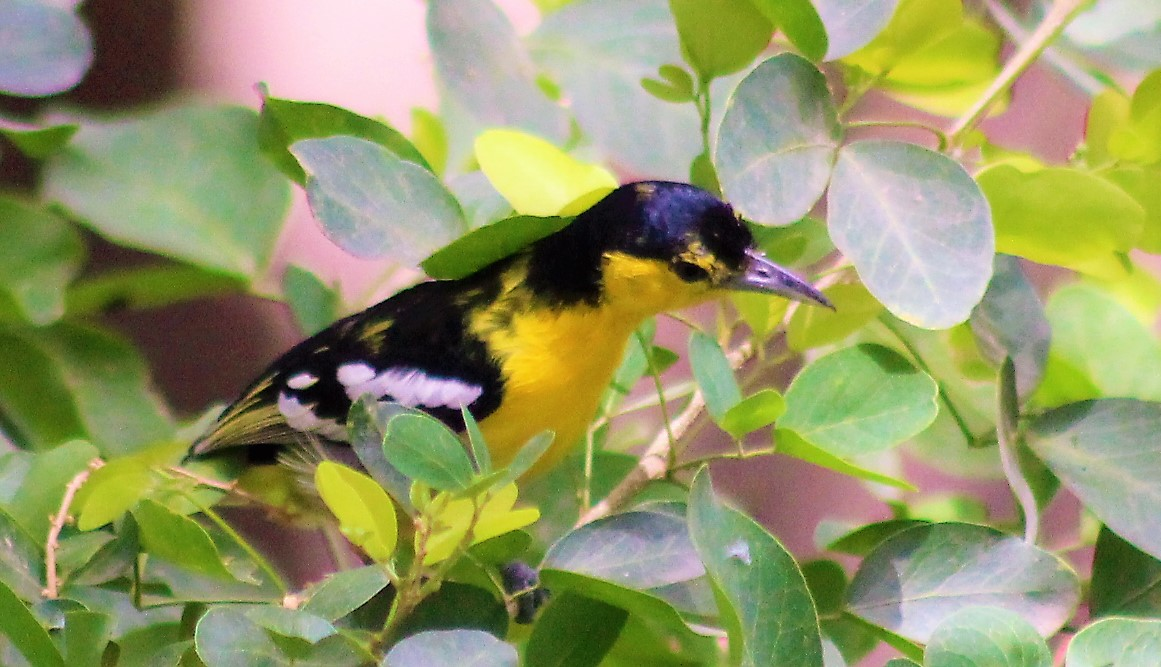
Male common iora

== Cuckooshrikes ==
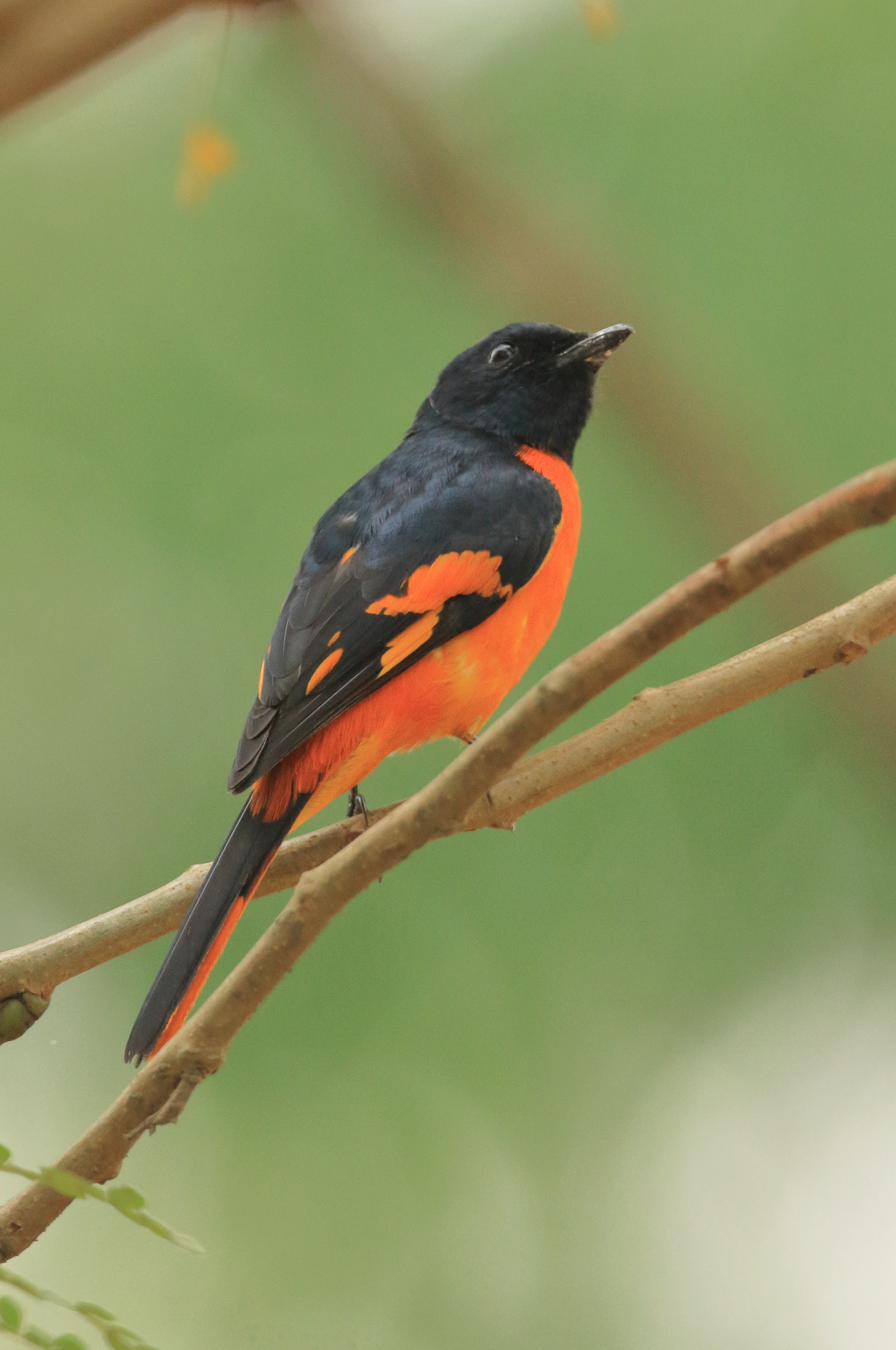
Scarlet minivet

Order: Passeriformes Family: Campephagidae

The cuckooshrikes are small to medium-sized passerine birds. They are predominantly greyish with white and black, although some species are brightly coloured. There are 16 species which have been recorded in India.

Common name	Binomial	Comments
White-bellied minivet	Pericrocotus erythropygius	(E)
Small minivet	Pericrocotus cinnamomeus	
Grey-chinned minivet	Pericrocotus solaris	
Short-billed minivet	Pericrocotus brevirostris	
Long-tailed minivet	Pericrocotus ethologus	
Orange minivet	Pericrocotus flammeus	
Scarlet minivet	Pericrocotus speciosus	
Ashy minivet	Pericrocotus divaricatus	(V)
Swinhoe's minivet	Pericrocotus cantonensis	(V)
Rosy minivet	Pericrocotus roseus	
Indian cuckooshrike	Coracina macei	
Oriental cuckooshrike	Coracina javensis	
Andaman cuckooshrike	Coracina dobsoni	(E); near threatened
Pied triller	Lalage nigra	
Black-winged cuckooshrike	Lalage melaschistos	
Black-headed cuckooshrike	Lalage melanoptera	

== Whistlers and allies ==
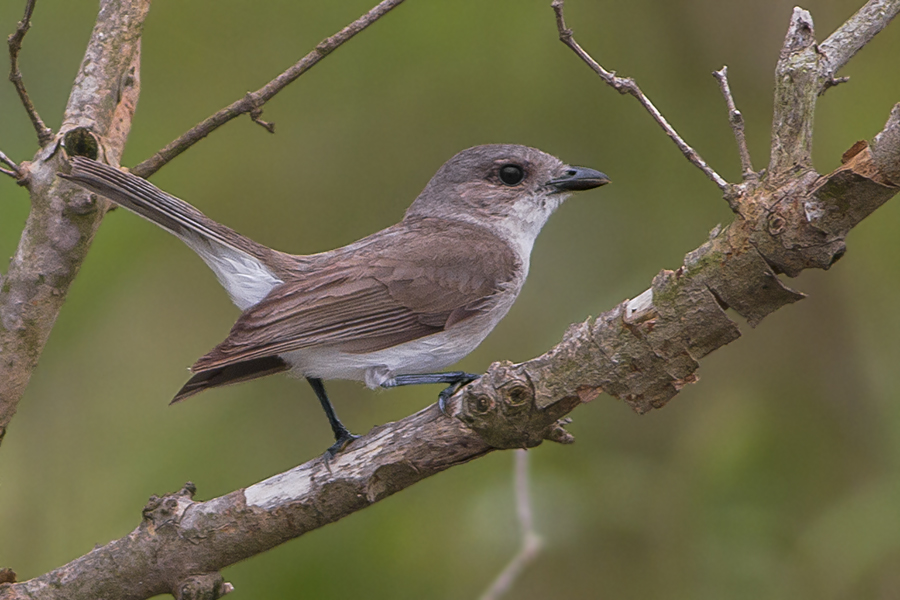
Mangrove whistler

Order: Passeriformes Family: Pachycephalidae

The family Pachycephalidae includes the whistlers, shrikethrushes, and some of the pitohuis. There is one species which occurs in India.

Common name	Binomial	Comments
Mangrove whistler	Pachycephala cinerea	

== Shrikes ==
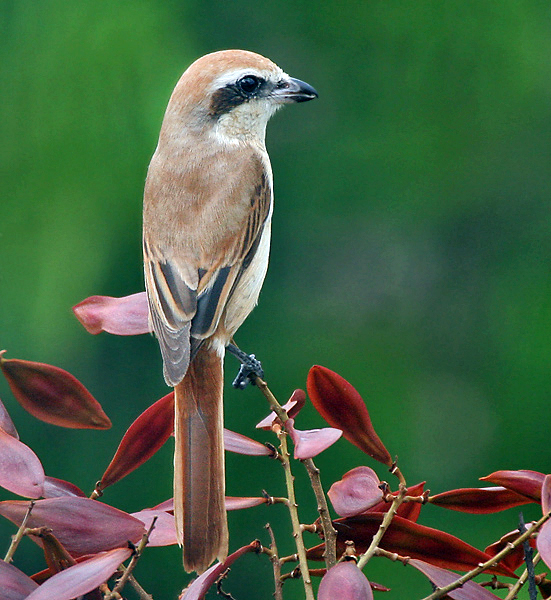
Brown shrike

Order: Passeriformes Family: Laniidae

Shrikes are passerine birds known for their habit of catching other birds and small animals and impaling the uneaten portions of their bodies on thorns. A typical shrike's beak is hooked, like a bird of prey.

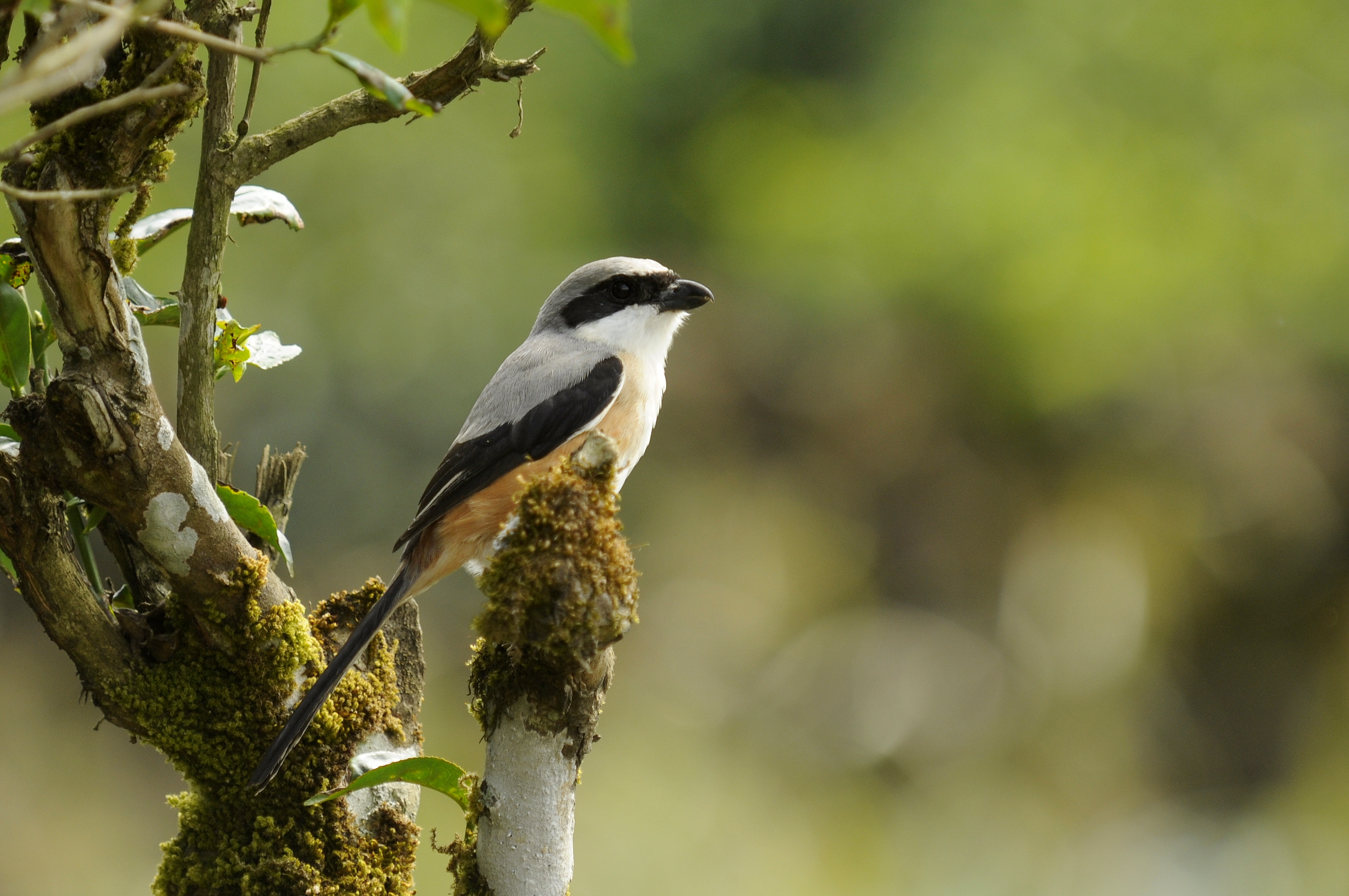
Long-tailed shrike

Common name	Binomial	Comments
Brown shrike	Lanius cristatus	
Giant grey shrike	Larus giganteus	(V)
Tiger shrike	Larus tigrinus	(V)
Red-backed shrike	Lanius collurio	
Isabelline shrike	Lanius isabellinus	
Red-tailed shrike	Lanius phoenicuroides	
Burmese shrike	Lanius collurioides	
Bay-backed shrike	Lanius vittatus	
Long-tailed shrike	Lanius schach	
Grey-backed shrike	Lanius tephronotus	
Lesser grey shrike	Lanius minor	(V)
Great grey shrike	Lanius excubitor	
Woodchat shrike	Lanius senator	(V); near threatened
Masked shrike	Lanius nubicus	(V)

== Vireos, greenlets, and shrike-babblers ==
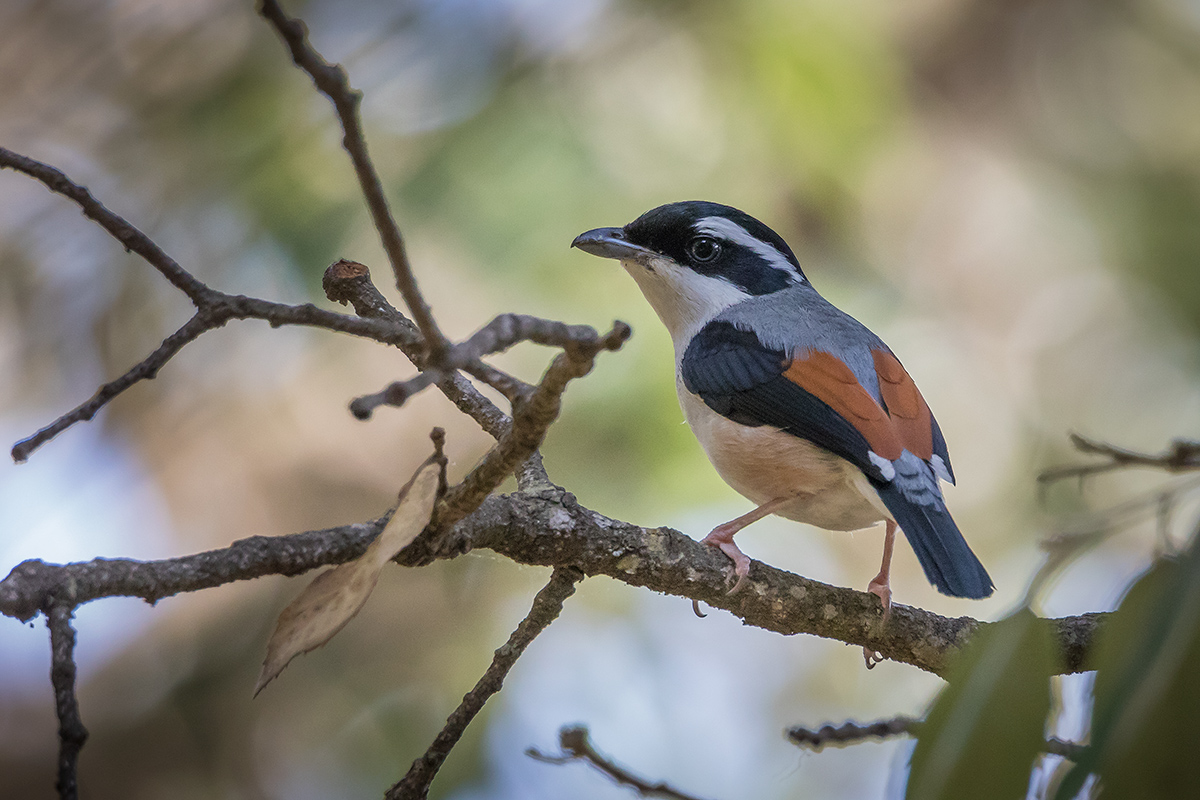
White-browed shrike-babbler (Himalayan)

Order: Passeriformes Family: Vireonidae

Most of the members of this family are found in the New World. However, the shrike-babblers and erpornis, which only slightly resemble the "true" vireos and greenlets, are found in South East Asia.

Common name	Binomial	Comments
White-bellied erpornis	Erpornis zantholeuca	
Black-headed shrike-babbler	Pteruthius rufiventer	
White-browed shrike-babbler	Pteruthius aeralatus	
Green shrike-babbler	Pteruthius xanthochlorus	
Black-eared shrike-babbler	Pteruthius melanotis	
Clicking shrike-babbler	Pteruthius intermedius	

== Figbirds, orioles, and turnagra ==
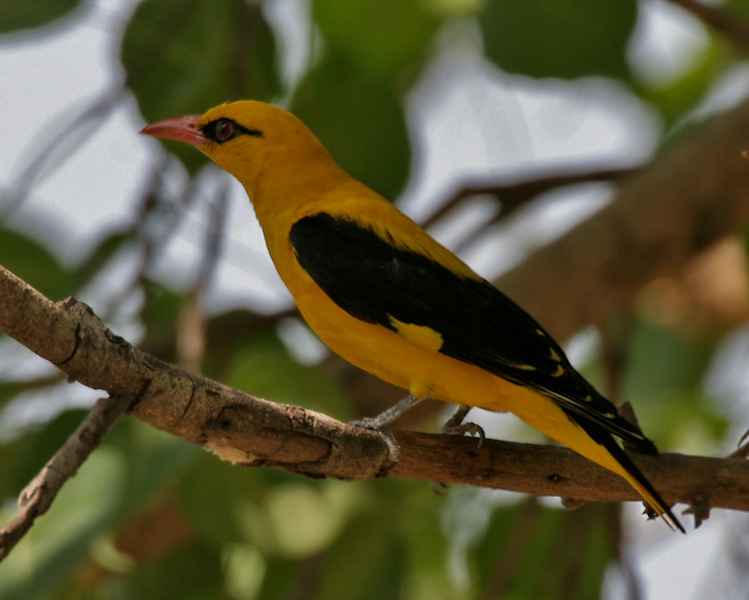
Indian golden oriole

Order: Passeriformes Family: Oriolidae

The Old World orioles are colourful passerine birds. They are not related to the New World orioles. There are six species which have been recorded in India.

Common name	Binomial	Comments
Maroon oriole	Oriolus traillii	
Black-hooded oriole	Oriolus xanthornus	
Indian golden oriole	Oriolus kundoo	
Eurasian golden oriole	Oriolus oriolus	
Black-naped oriole	Oriolus chinensis	
Slender-billed oriole	Oriolus tenuirostris	

== Drongos ==
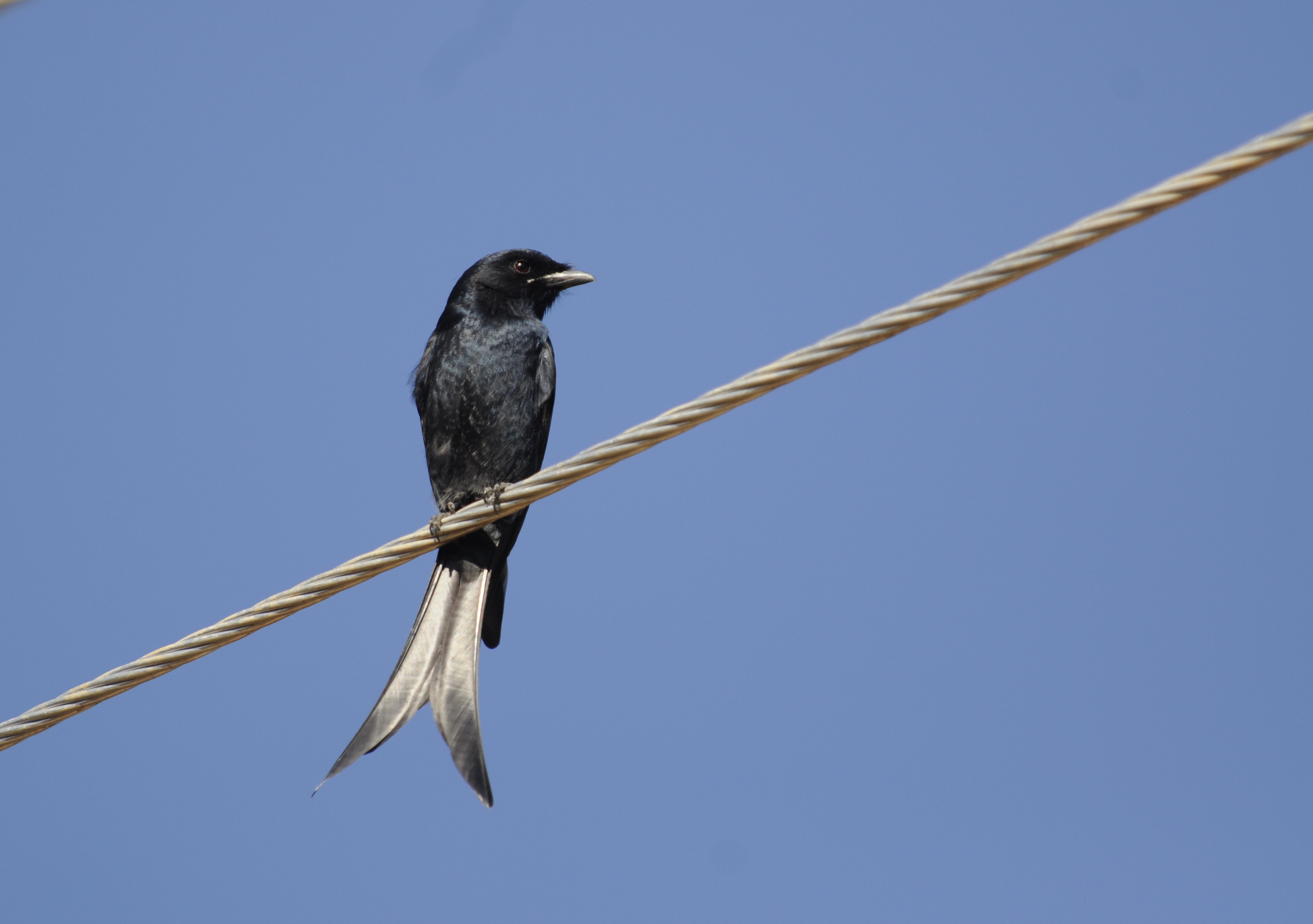
Black drongo

Order: Passeriformes Family: Dicruridae

The drongos are mostly black or dark grey in colour, sometimes with metallic tints. They have long forked tails, and some Asian species have elaborate tail decorations. They have short legs and sit very upright when perched, like a shrike. They flycatch or take prey from the ground. There are ten species which have been recorded in India.

Common name	Binomial	Comments
Bronzed drongo	Dicrurus aeneus	
Lesser racket-tailed drongo	Dicrurus remifer	
Crow-billed drongo	Dicrurus annectens	
Greater racket-tailed drongo	Dicrurus paradiseus	
Andaman drongo	Dicrurus andamanensis	
Hair-crested drongo	Dicrurus hottentottus	
Ashy drongo	Dicrurus leucophaeus	
White-bellied drongo	Dicrurus caerulescens	
Black drongo	Dicrurus macrocercus	

== Fantails and silktails ==
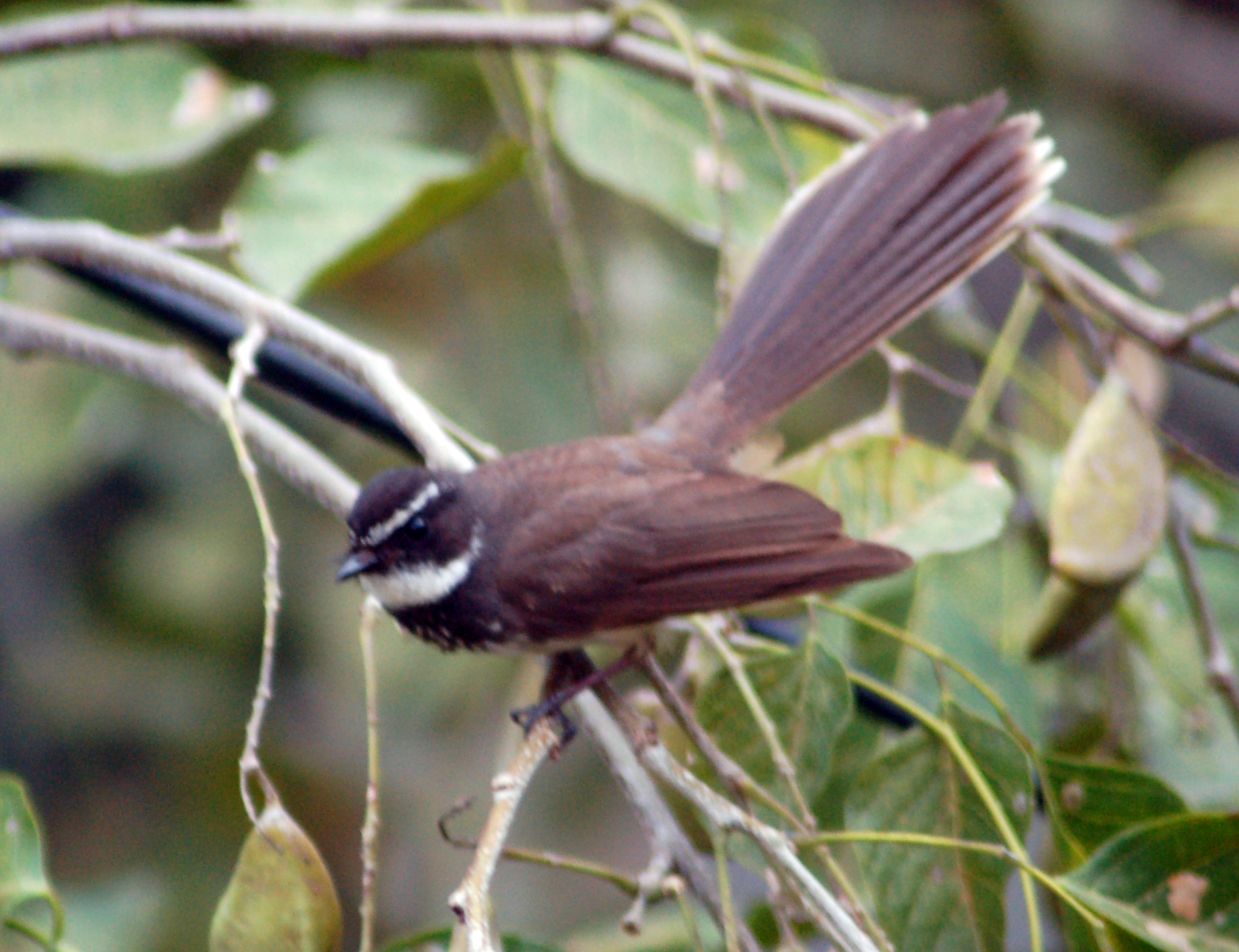
White-throated fantail

Order: Passeriformes Family: Rhipiduridae

The fantails are small insectivorous birds which are specialist aerial feeders. There are three species which occur in India.

Common name	Binomial	Comments
White-throated fantail	Rhipidura albicollis	
White-spotted fantail	Rhipidura albogularis	(E)
White-browed fantail	Rhipidura aureola	

== Monarchs ==
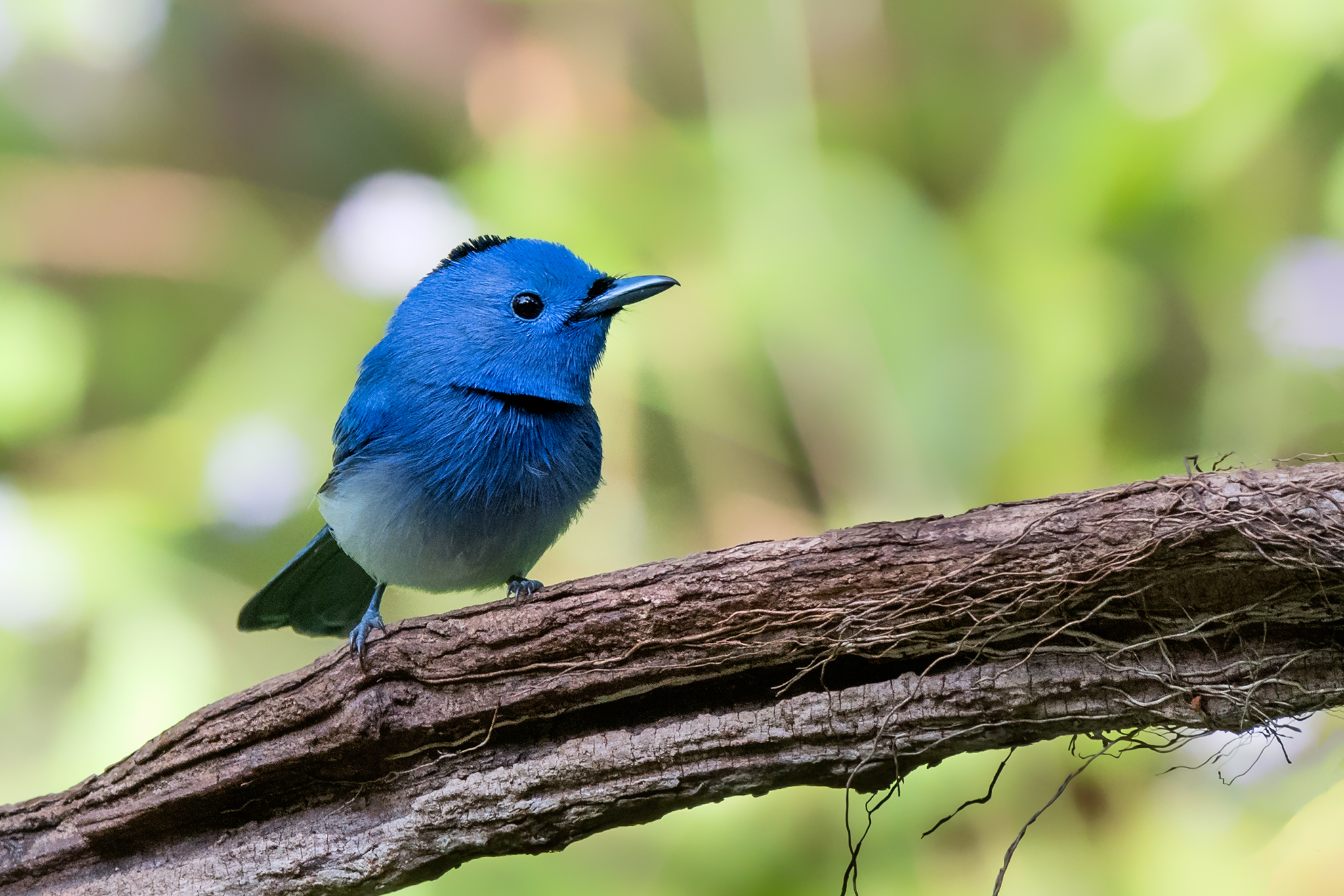
Black-naped monarch

Order: Passeriformes Family: Monarchidae

The monarch flycatchers are small to medium-sized insectivorous passerines which hunt by flycatching. There are four species which have been recorded in India.

Common name	Binomial	Comments
Black-naped monarch	Hypothymis azurea	
Indian paradise flycatcher	Terpsiphone paradisi	
Blyth's paradise flycatcher	Terpsiphone affinis	
Amur paradise flycatcher	Terpsiphone incei	(V)

== Crows and jays ==
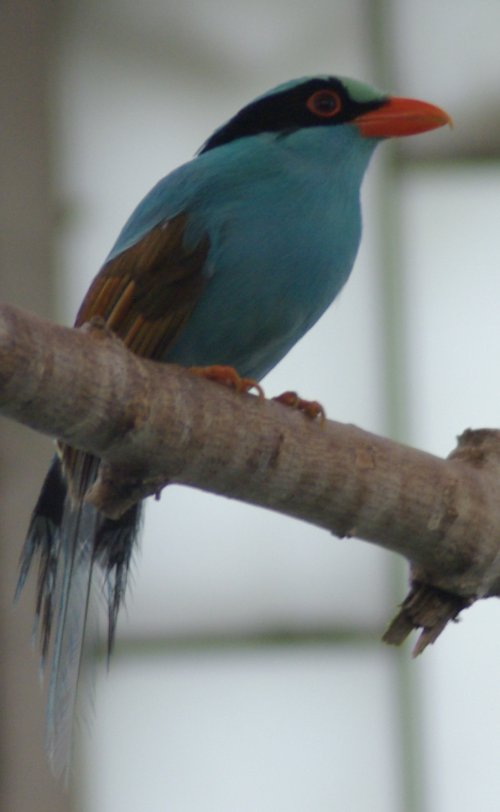
Common green magpie

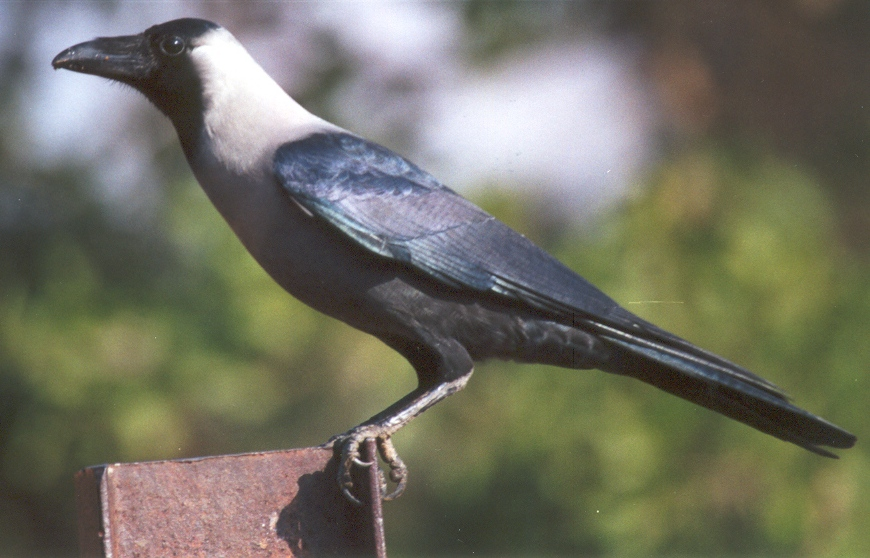
House crow

Order: Passeriformes Family: Corvidae

The family Corvidae includes crows, ravens, jays, choughs, magpies, treepies, nutcrackers and ground jays. Corvids are above average in size among the Passeriformes, and some of the larger species show high levels of intelligence.

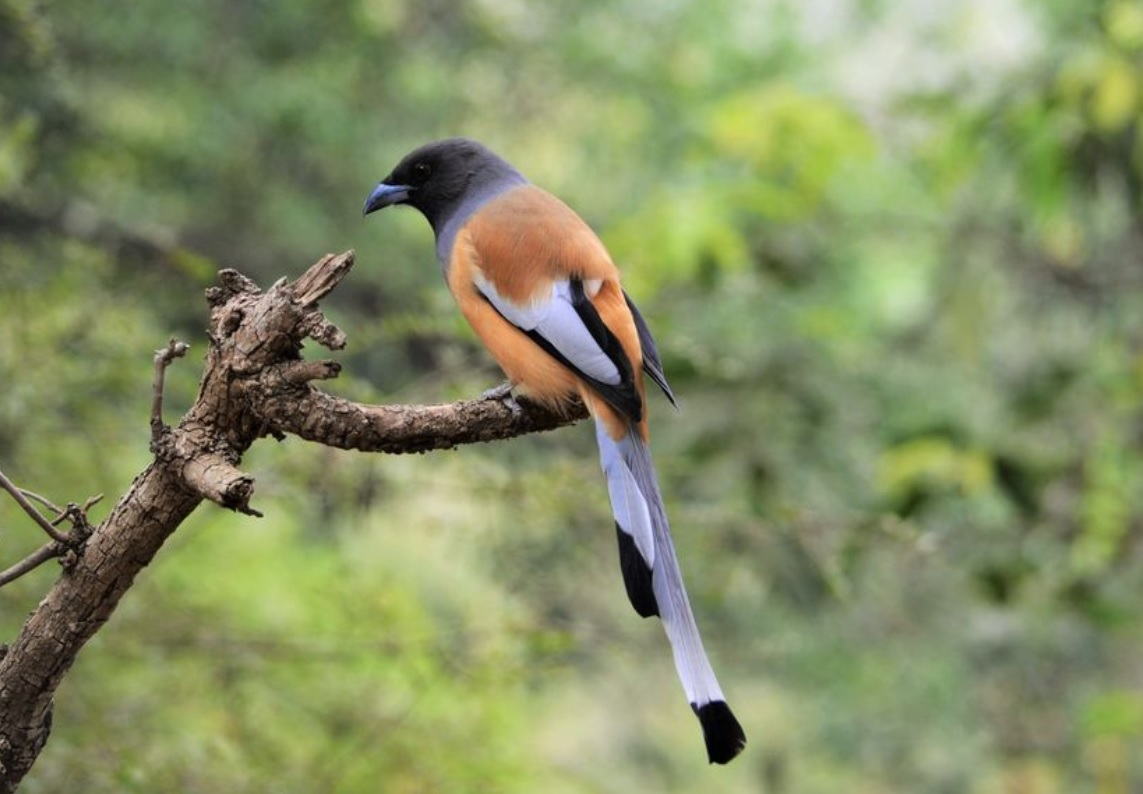
Rufous treepie

Common name	Binomial	Comments
Eurasian jay	Garrulus glandarius	
Black-headed jay	Garrulus lanceolatus	
Yellow-billed blue magpie	Urocissa flavirostris	
Red-billed blue magpie	Urocissa erythroryncha	
Common green magpie	Cissa chinensis	
Rufous treepie	Dendrocitta vagabunda	
Grey treepie	Dendrocitta formosae	
White-bellied treepie	Dendrocitta leucogastra	(E)
Collared treepie	Dendrocitta frontalis	
Andaman treepie	Dendrocitta bayleii	(E); vulnerable
Eurasian magpie	Pica pica	
Black-rumped magpie	Pica bottanensis	(V)
Northern nutcracker	Nucifraga caryocatactes	
Southern nutcracker	Nucifraga hemispila	
Kashmir nutcracker	Nucifraga multipunctata	
Red-billed chough	Pyrrhocorax pyrrhocorax	
Alpine chough	Pyrrhocorax graculus	
Western jackdaw	Coloeus monedula	
House crow	Corvus splendens	
Rook	Corvus frugilegus	
Carrion crow	Corvus corone	
Hooded crow	Corvus cornix	(V)
Large-billed crow	Corvus macrorhynchos	
Pied crow	Corvus albus	(V)
Common raven	Corvus corax	

== Waxwings ==
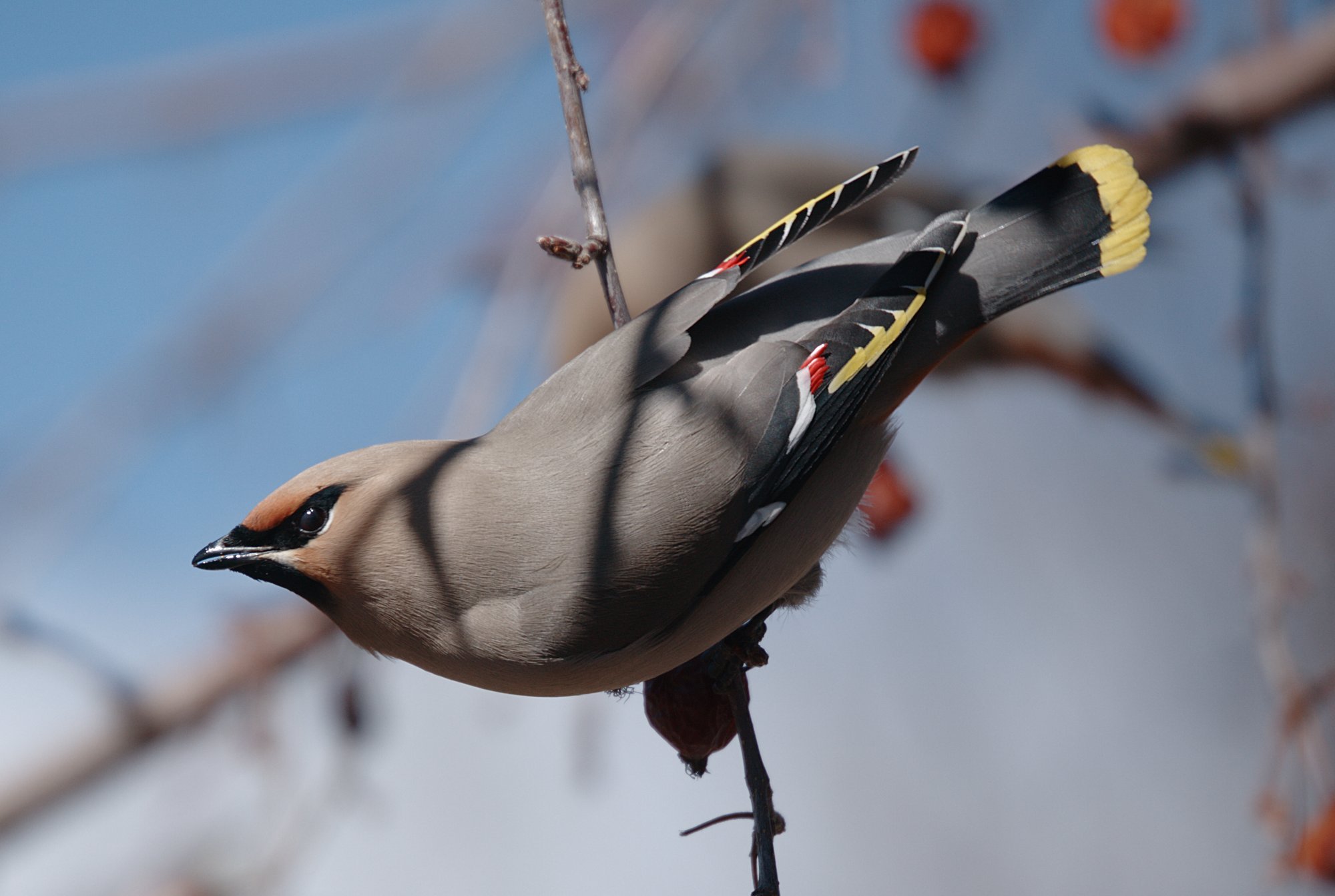
Bohemian waxwing

Order: Passeriformes Family: Bombycillidae

The waxwings are a group of birds with soft silky plumage and unique red tips to some of the wing feathers. In the Bohemian and cedar waxwings, these tips look like sealing wax and give the group its name. These are arboreal birds of northern forests. They live on insects in summer and berries in winter. There is one species which occurs in India.

Common name	Binomial	Comments
Bohemian waxwing	Bombycilla garrulus	(V)

== Hypocolius ==
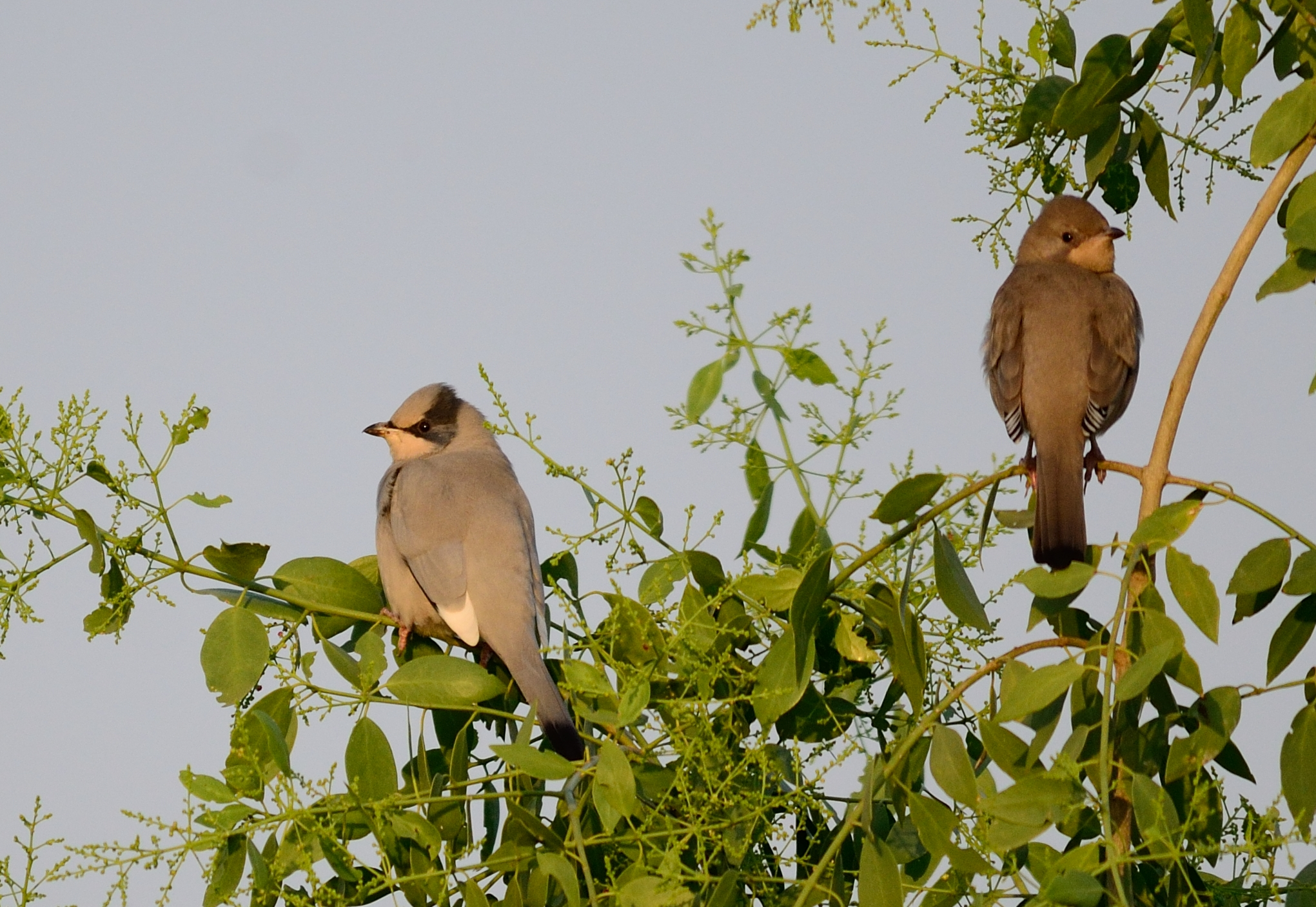
Hypocolius

Order: Passeriformes Family: Hypocoliidae

The grey hypocolius is a small Middle Eastern bird with the shape and soft plumage of a waxwing. They are mainly a uniform grey colour except the males have a black triangular mask around their eyes.

Common name	Binomial	Comments
Grey hypocolius	Hypocolius ampelinus	

== Fairy flycatchers ==
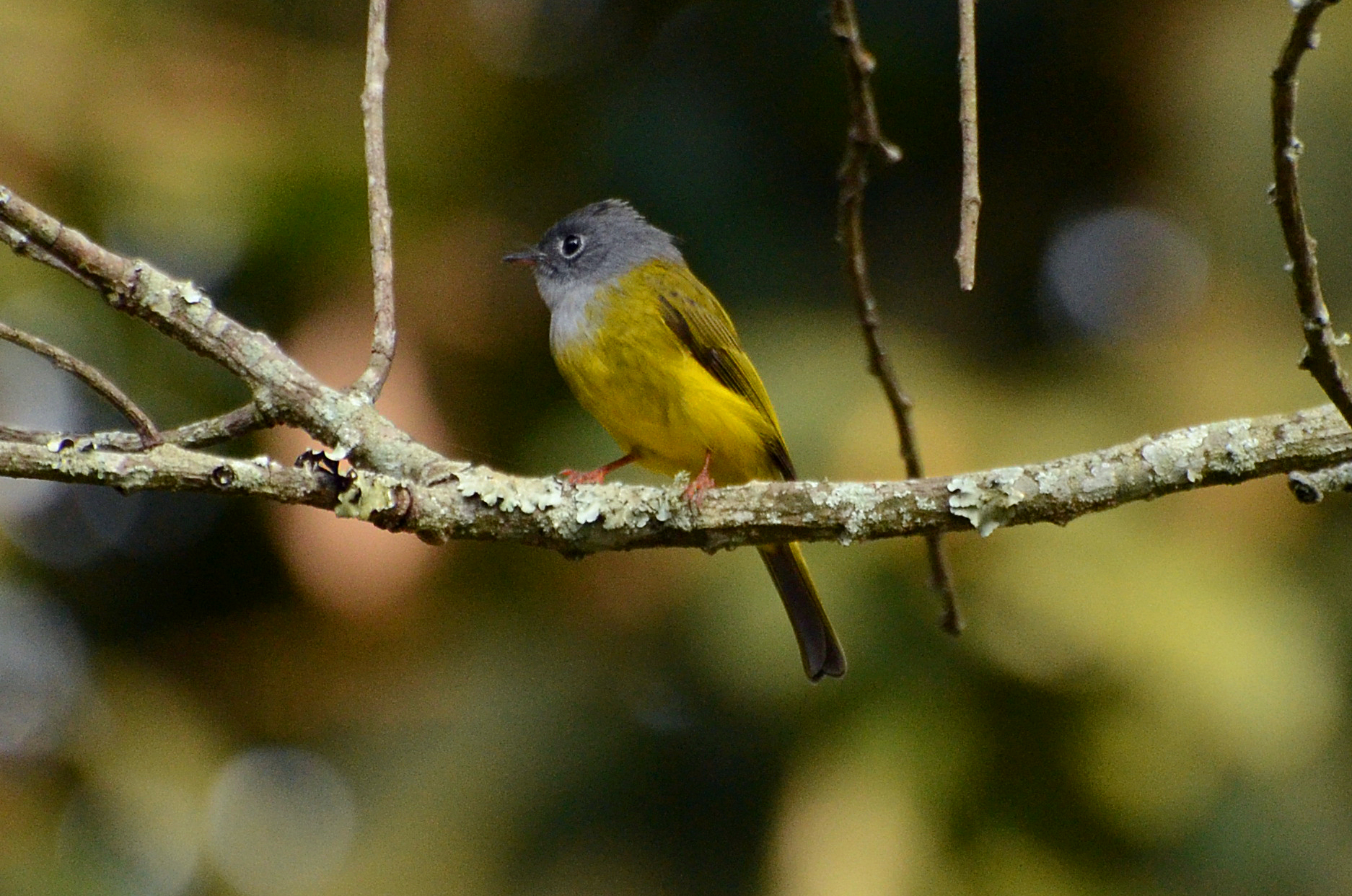
Grey-headed canary-flycatcher

Order: Passeriformes Family: Stenostiridae

Most of the species of this small family are found in Africa, though a few inhabit tropical Asia. They are not closely related to other birds called "flycatchers".

Common name	Binomial	Comments
Yellow-bellied fantail	Chelidorhynx hypoxanthus	
Grey-headed canary-flycatcher	Culicicapa ceylonensis	

== Tits and chickadees ==
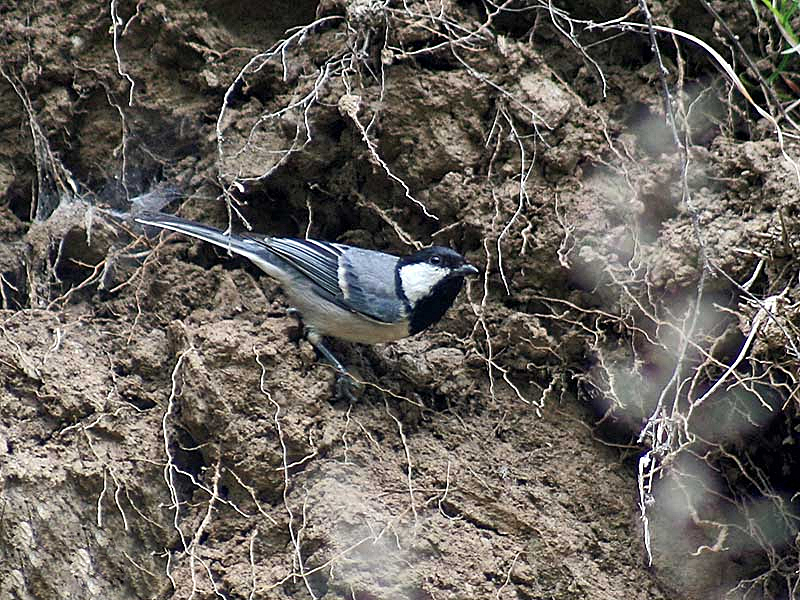
Cinereous tit

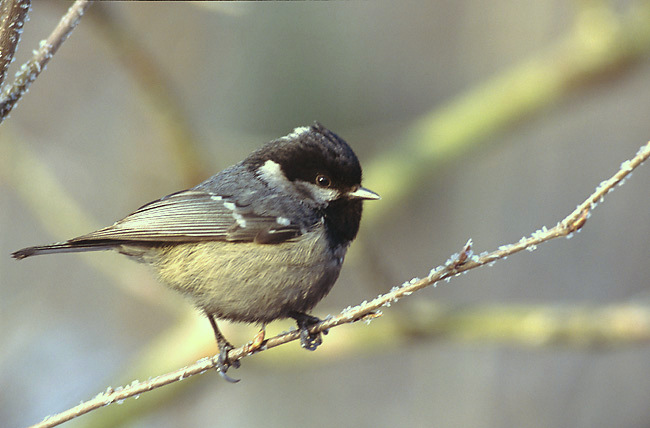
Coal tit

Order: Passeriformes Family: Paridae

The Paridae are mainly small stocky woodland species with short stout bills. Some have crests. They are adaptable birds, with a mixed diet including seeds and insects.

Common name	Binomial	Comments
Fire-capped tit	Cephalopyrus flammiceps	
Yellow-browed tit	Sylviparus modestus	
Sultan tit	Melanochlora sultanea	
Rufous-naped tit	Periparus rufonuchalis	
Rufous-vented tit	Periparus rubidiventris	
Coal tit	Periparus ater	
Grey-crested tit	Lophophanes dichrous	
Azure tit	Cyanistes cyanus	
Ground tit	Pseudopodoces humilis	
Cinereous tit	Parus cinereus	
Green-backed tit	Parus monticolus	
White-naped tit	Machlolophus nuchalis	(E); vulnerable
Himalayan black-lored tit	Machlolophus xanthogenys	
Indian black-lored tit	Machlolophus aplonotus	(E)
Yellow-cheeked tit	Machlolophus spilonotus	

== Penduline tits ==
Order: Passeriformes Family: Remizidae

The penduline tits are a group of small passerine birds related to the true tits. They are insectivores. There is one species which has been recorded in India.

Common name	Binomial	Comments
White-crowned penduline tit	Remiz coronatus	(V)

== Larks ==
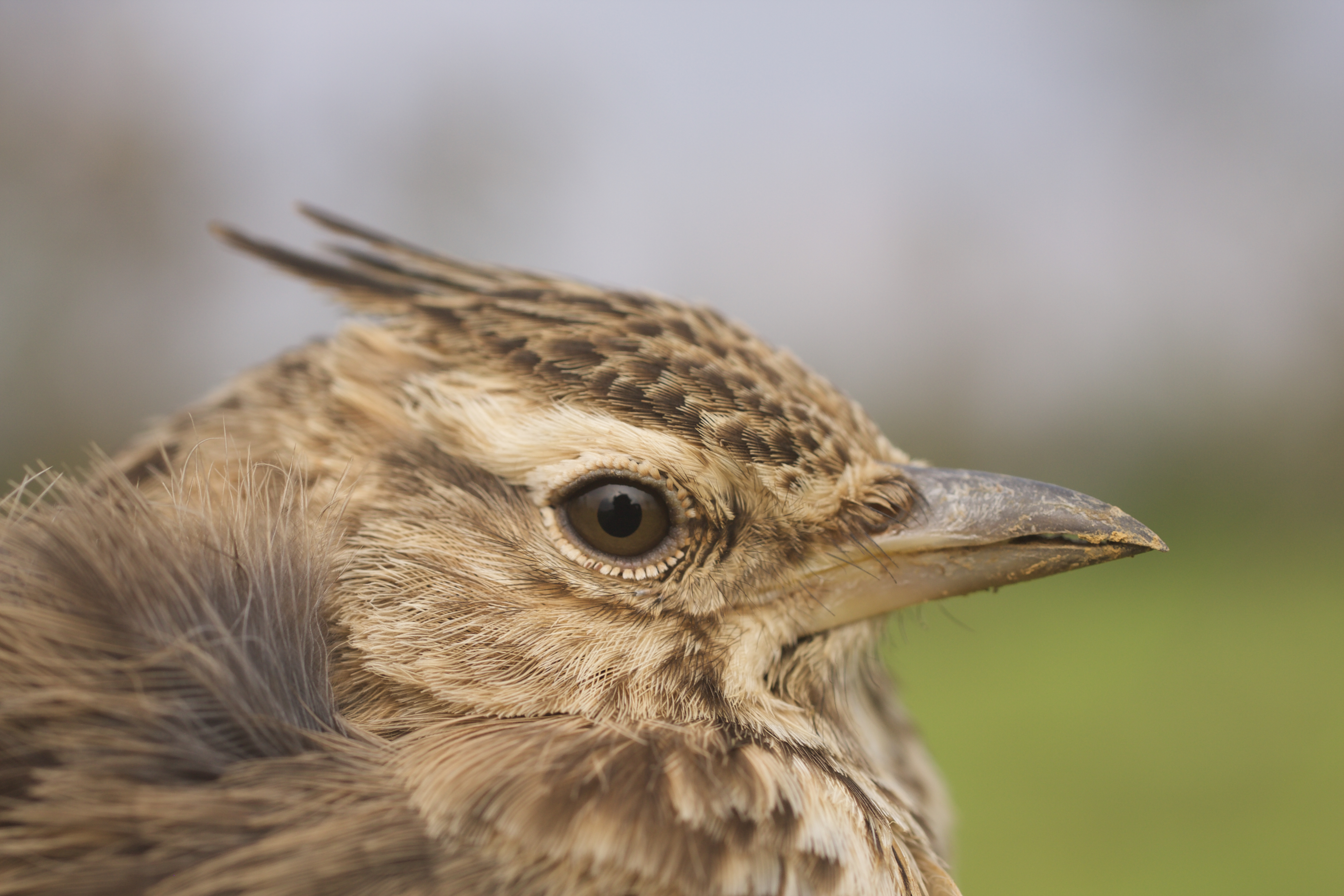
Malabar lark

Order: Passeriformes Family: Alaudidae

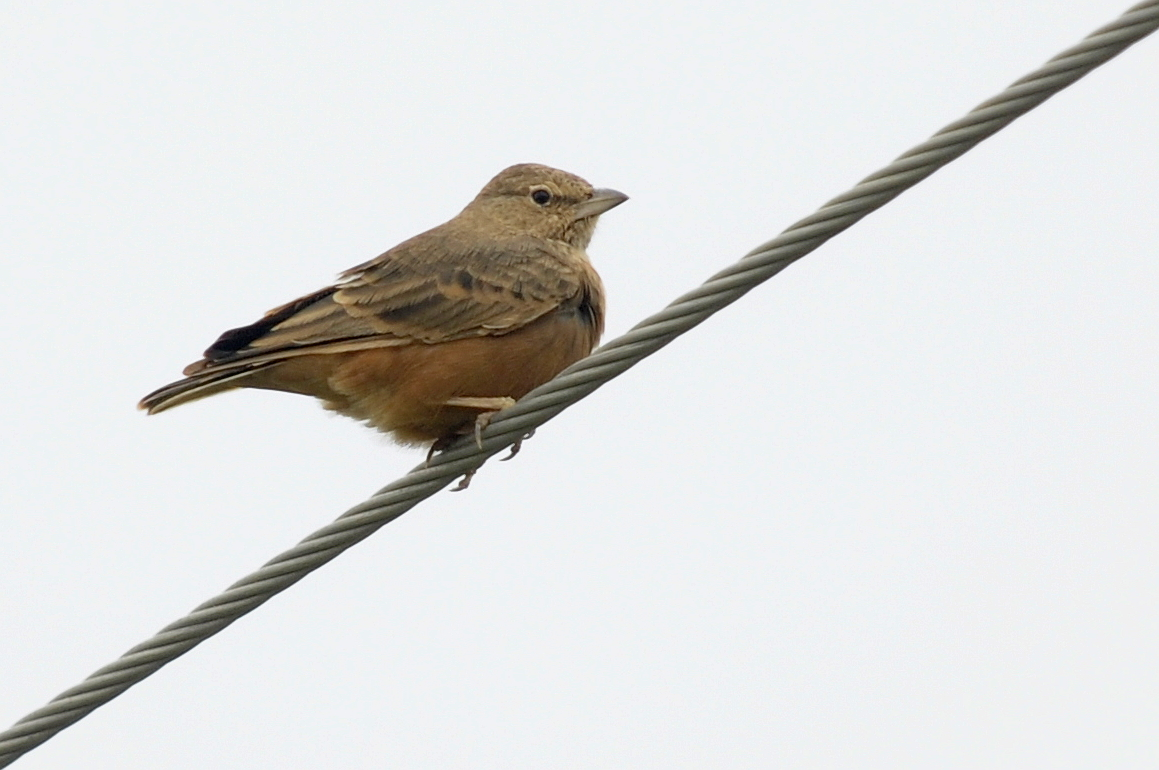
Rufous-tailed lark

Larks are small terrestrial birds with often extravagant songs and display flights. Most larks are fairly dull in appearance. Their food is insects and seeds.

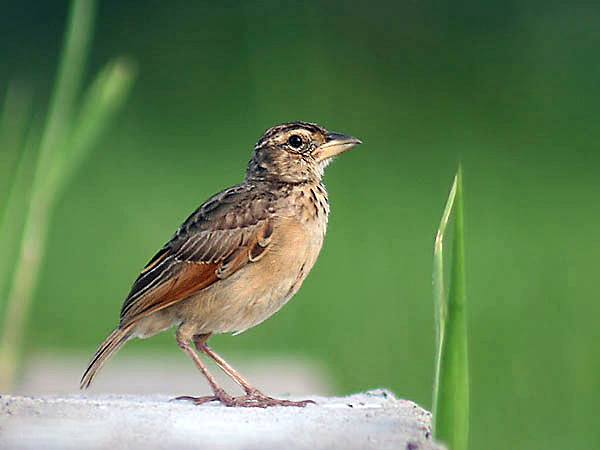
Bengal bushlark

Common name	Binomial	Comments
Greater hoopoe-lark	Alaemon alaudipes	
Desert lark	Ammomanes deserti	
Rufous-tailed lark	Ammomanes phoenicura	(E)
Black-crowned sparrow-lark	Eremopterix nigriceps	
Ashy-crowned sparrow-lark	Eremopterix griseus	
Singing bush lark	Mirafra javanica cantillans	
Bengal bush lark	Plocealauda assamica	
Indian bush lark	Plocealauda erythroptera	
Jerdon's bush lark	Plocealauda affinis	
Oriental skylark	Alauda gulgula	
Eurasian skylark	Alauda arvensis	
Sykes's lark	Galerida deva	(E)
Crested lark	Galerida cristata	
Malabar lark	Galerida malabarica	(E)
Horned lark	Eremophila alpestris	
Hume's short-toed lark	Calandrella acutirostris	
Mongolian short-toed lark	Calandrella dukhunensis	
Greater short-toed lark	Calandrella brachydactyla	
Bimaculated lark	Melanocorypha bimaculata	
Tibetan lark	Melanocorypha maxima	
Turkestan short-toed lark	Alaudala heinei	
Sand lark	Alaudala raytal	

== Bulbuls ==
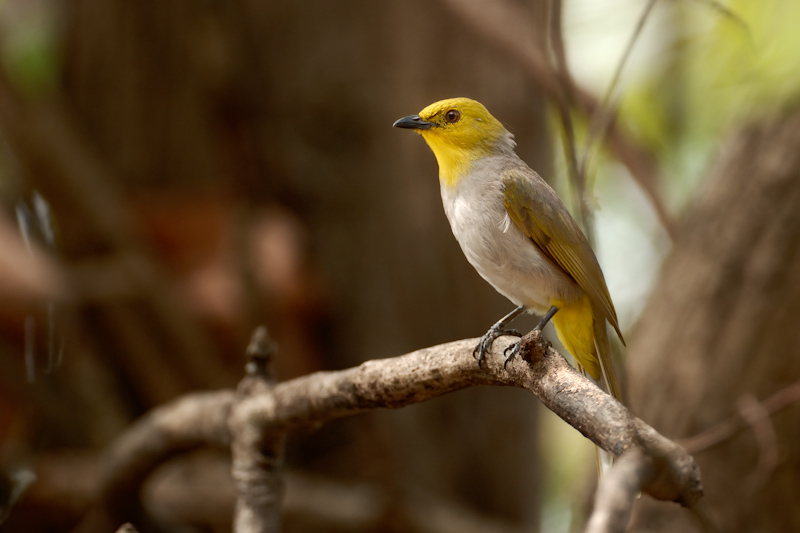
Yellow-throated bulbul

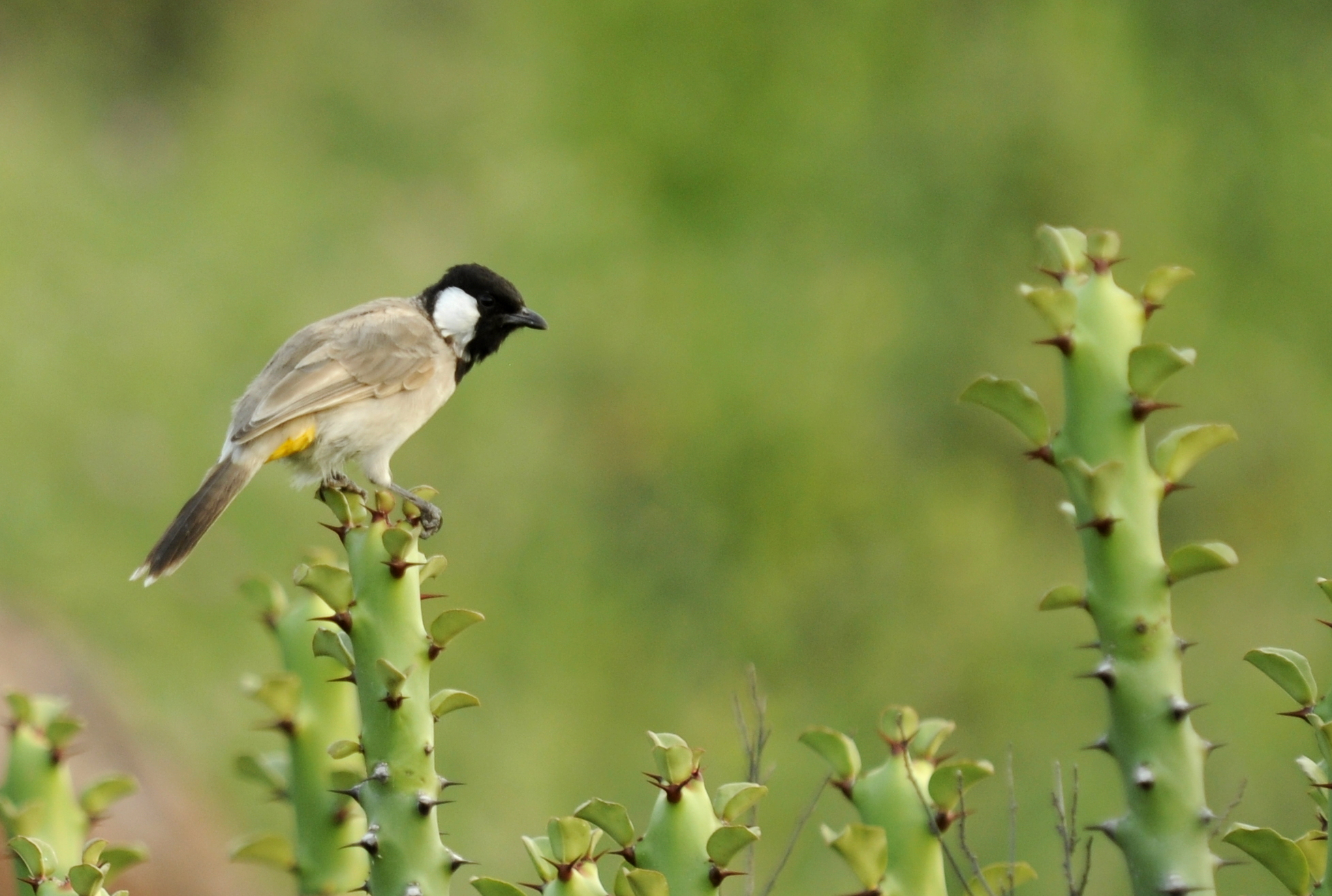
White-eared bulbul

Order: Passeriformes Family: Pycnonotidae

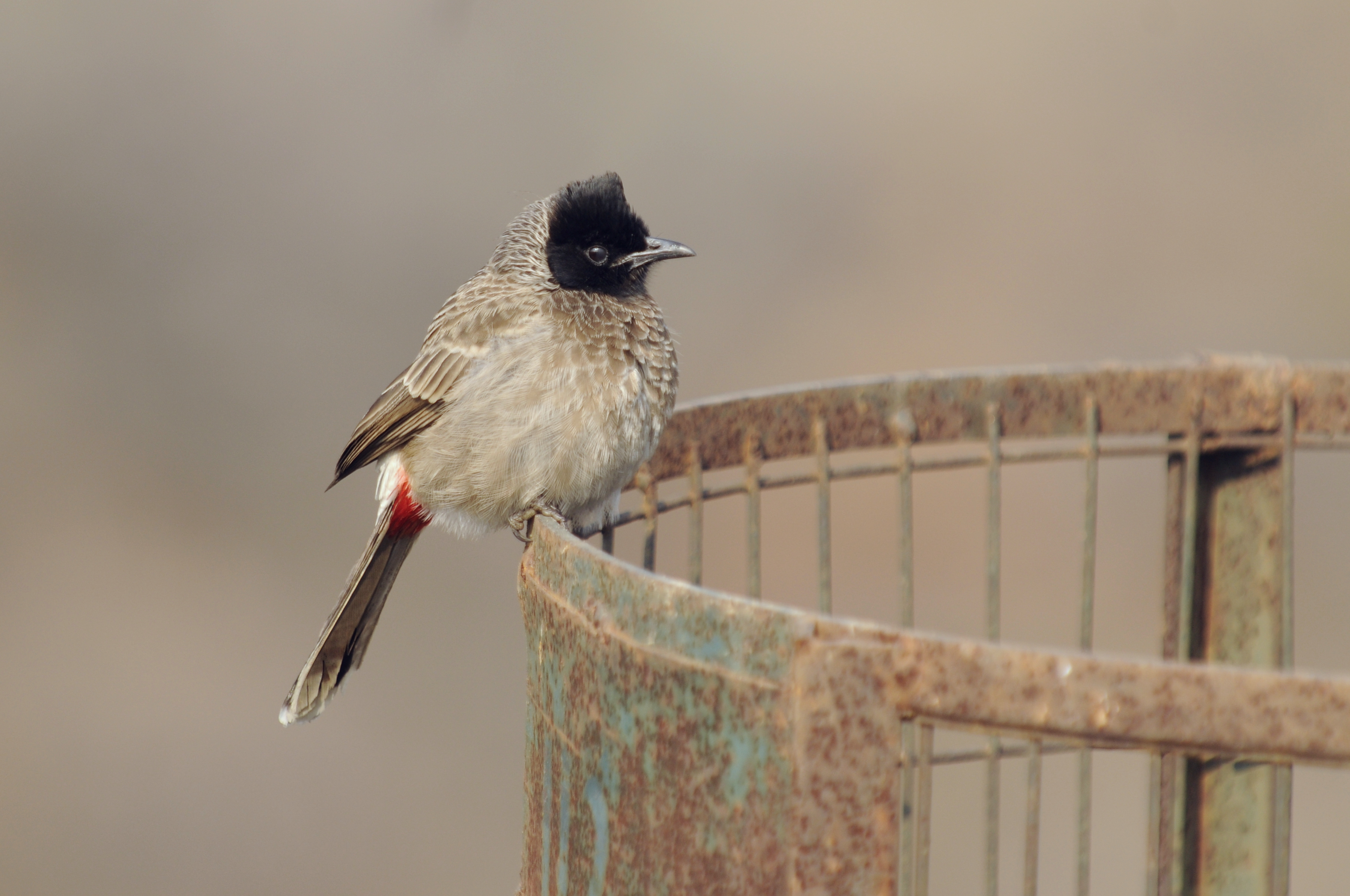
Red-vented bulbul

Bulbuls are medium-sized songbirds. Some are colourful with yellow, red or orange vents, cheeks, throats or supercilia, but most are drab, with uniform olive-brown to black plumage. Some species have distinct crests.

Common name	Binomial	Comments
White-throated bulbul	Alophoixus flaveolus	
Striated bulbul	Alcurus striatus	
Cachar bulbul	Iole cacharensis	(E)
Grey-eyed bulbul	Iole propinqua	(V)
Ashy bulbul	Hemixos flavala	
Yellow-browed bulbul	Acritillas indica	
Mountain bulbul	Ixos mcclellandii	
Nicobar bulbul	Ixos nicobariensis	(E); near threatened
Black bulbul	Hypsipetes leucocephalus	
Square-tailed bulbul	Hypsipetes ganeesa	
Grey-headed bulbul	Brachypodius priocephalus	(E); near threatened
Black-headed bulbul	Brachypodius melanocephalos	
Andaman bulbul	Brachypodius fuscoflavescens	(E)
Black-crested bulbul	Rubigula flaviventris	
Flame-throated bulbul	Rubigula gularis	(E)
Crested finchbill	Spizixos canifrons	
White-browed bulbul	Pycnonotus luteolus	
Flavescent bulbul	Pycnonotus flavescens	
Yellow-throated bulbul	Pycnonotus xantholaemus	(E)
Red-whiskered bulbul	Pycnonotus jocosus	
Red-vented bulbul	Pycnonotus cafer	
White-eared bulbul	Pycnonotus leucotis	
Himalayan bulbul	Pycnonotus leucogenys	

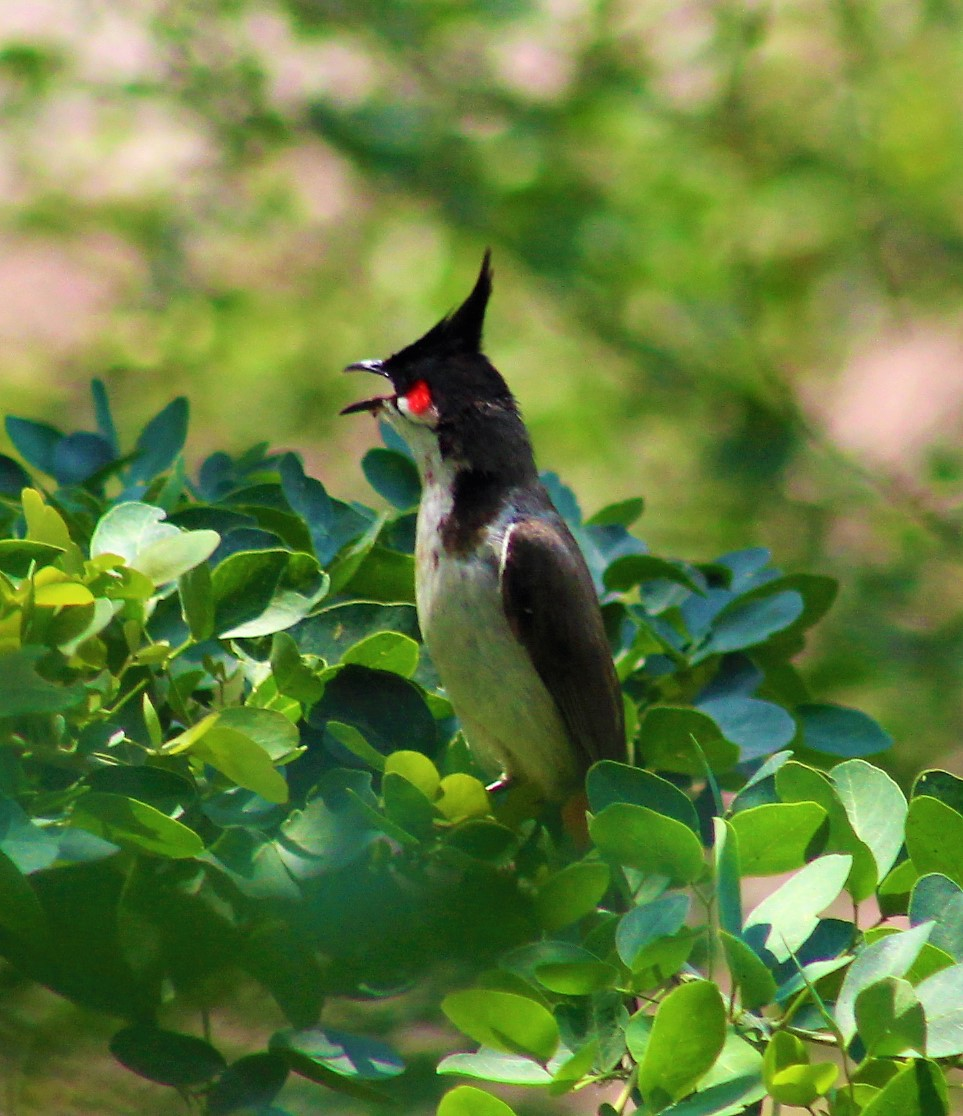
Red whiskered bulbul

== Swallows and martins ==
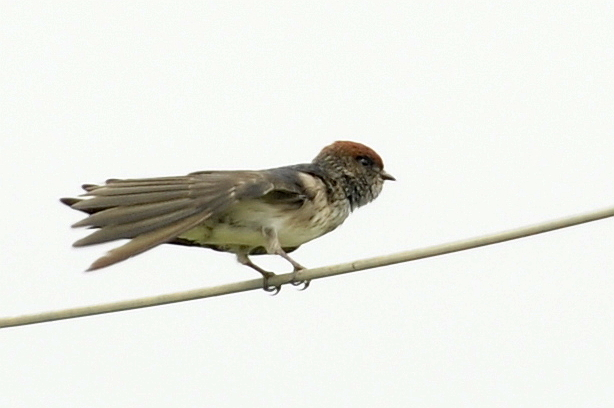
Streak-throated swallow

Order: Passeriformes Family: Hirundinidae

The family Hirundinidae is adapted to aerial feeding. They have a slender streamlined body, long pointed wings and a short bill with a wide gape. The feet are adapted to perching rather than walking, and the front toes are partially joined at the base.

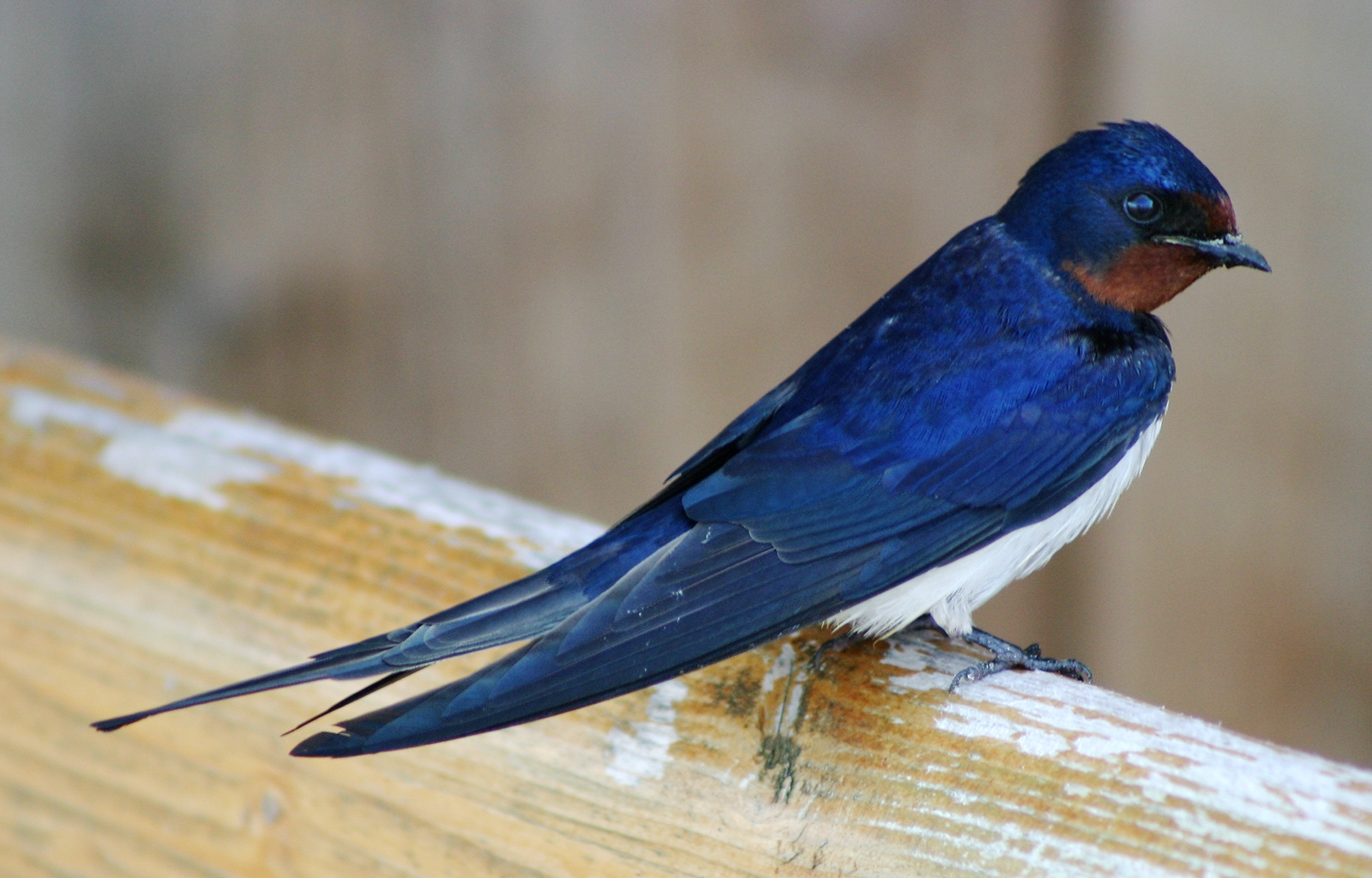
Barn swallow

Common name	Binomial	Comments
Grey-throated martin	Riparia chinensis	
Sand martin	Riparia riparia	
Pale martin	Riparia diluta	
Barn swallow	Hirundo rustica	
Pacific swallow	Hirundo tahitica	
Hill swallow	Hirundo domicola	
Wire-tailed swallow	Hirundo smithii	
Eurasian crag martin	Ptyonoprogne rupestris	
Dusky crag martin	Ptyonoprogne concolor	
Common house martin	Delichon urbicum	
Asian house martin	Delichon dasypus	
Nepal house martin	Delichon nipalense	
Red-rumped swallow	Cecropis daurica	
Striated swallow	Cecropis striolata	
Streak-throated swallow	Petrochelidon fluvicola	

== Cupwings ==
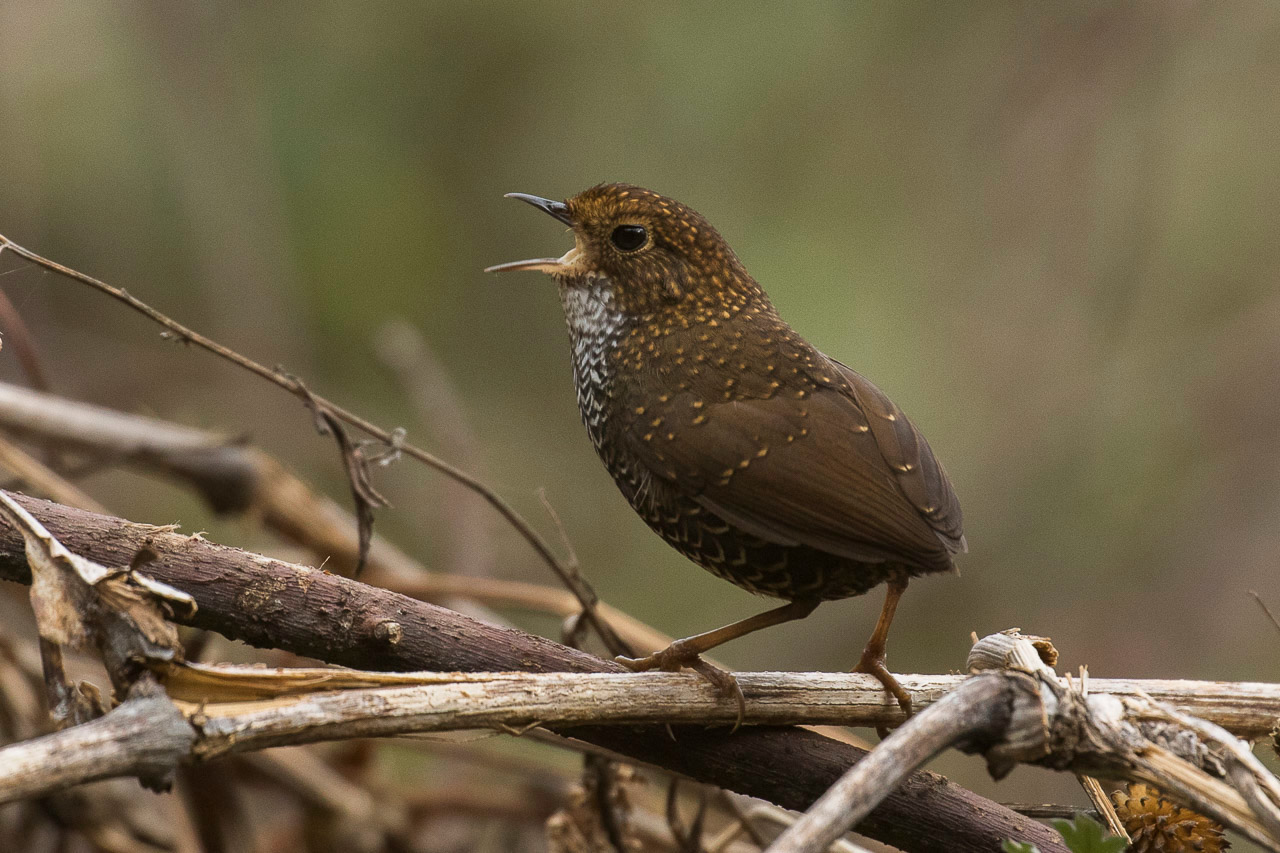
Scaly-breasted cupwing

Order: Passeriformes Family: Pnoepygidae

The members of this small family are found in mountainous parts of South and South East Asia.

Common name	Binomial	Comments
Scaly-breasted cupwing	Pnoepyga albiventer	
Nepal cupwing	Pnoepyga immaculata	
Pygmy cupwing	Pnoepyga pusilla	

== Cettia bush warblers and allies ==
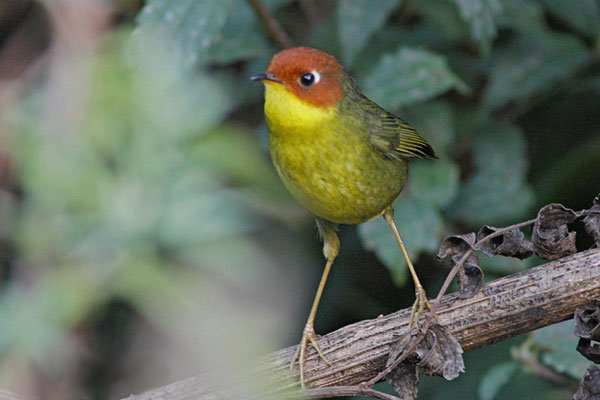
Chestnut-headed tesia

Order: Passeriformes Family: Cettiidae

Cettiidae is a family of small insectivorous songbirds. It contains the typical bush warblers (Cettia) and their relatives. Its members occur mainly in Asia and Africa, ranging into Oceania and Europe.

Common name	Binomial	Comments
Yellow-bellied warbler	Abroscopus superciliaris	
Rufous-faced warbler	Abroscopus albogularis	
Black-faced warbler	Abroscopus schisticeps	
Mountain tailorbird	Phyllergates cucullatus	
Broad-billed warbler	Tickellia hodgsoni	
Manchurian bush warbler	Horornis canturians	
Brown-flanked bush warbler	Horornis fortipes	
Hume's bush warbler	Horornis brunnescens	
Aberrant bush warbler	Horornis flavolivaceus	
Grey-bellied tesia	Tesia cyaniventer	
Slaty-bellied tesia	Tesia olivea	
Cetti's warbler	Cettia cetti	
Chestnut-crowned bush warbler	Cettia major	
Grey-sided bush warbler	Cettia brunnifrons	
Chestnut-headed tesia	Cettia castaneocoronata	
Asian stubtail	Urosphena squameiceps	(V)
Pale-footed bush warbler	Hemitesia pallidipes	

== Bushtits ==
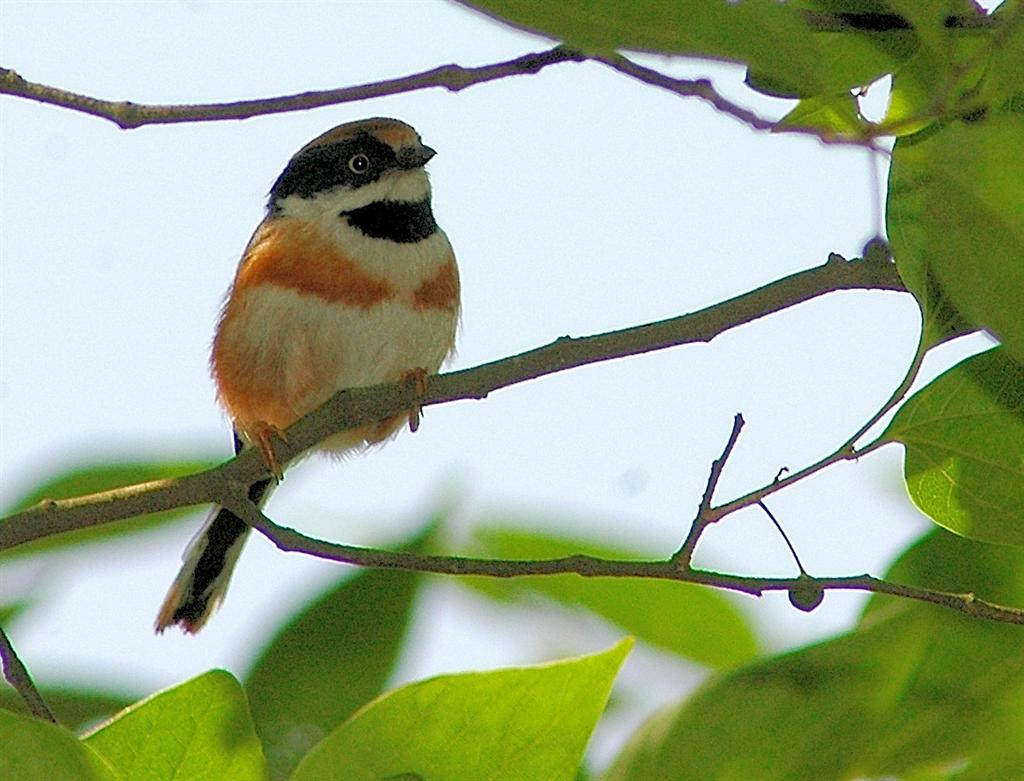
Black-throated tit

Order: Passeriformes Family: Aegithalidae

Long-tailed tits are a group of small passerine birds with medium to long tails. They make woven bag nests in trees. Most eat a mixed diet which includes insects.

Common name	Binomial	Comments
White-cheeked bushtit	Aegithalos leucogenys	
Black-throated bushtit	Aegithalos concinnus	
White-throated bushtit	Aegithalos niveogularis	
Rufous-fronted bushtit	Aegithalos iouschistos	
Black-browed bushtit	Aegithalos bonvaloti	
White-browed tit-warbler	Leptopoecile sophiae	
Crested tit-warbler	Leptopoecile elegans	(V)

== Leaf warblers and allies ==
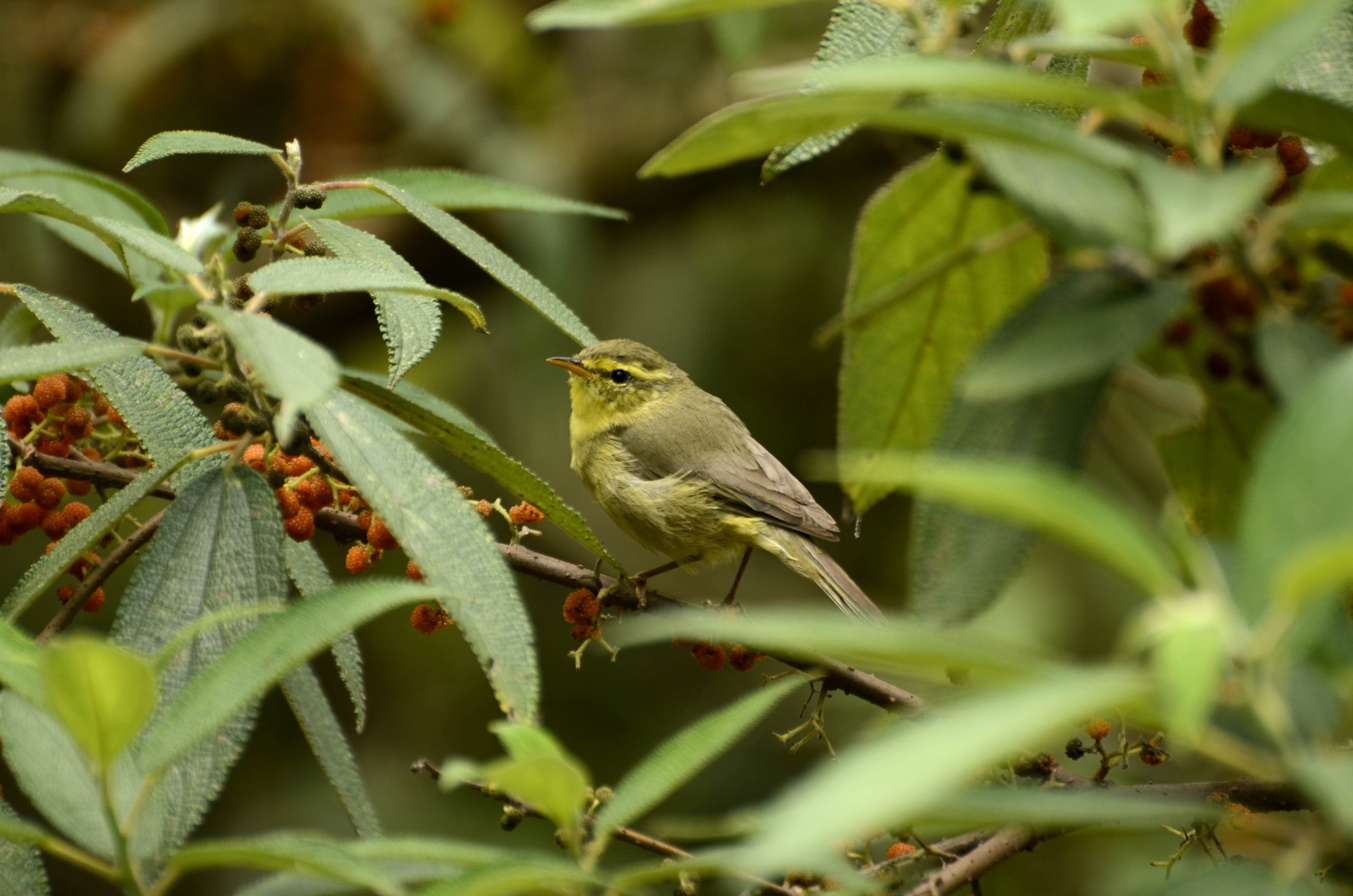
Tickell's leaf warbler

Order: Passeriformes Family: Phylloscopidae

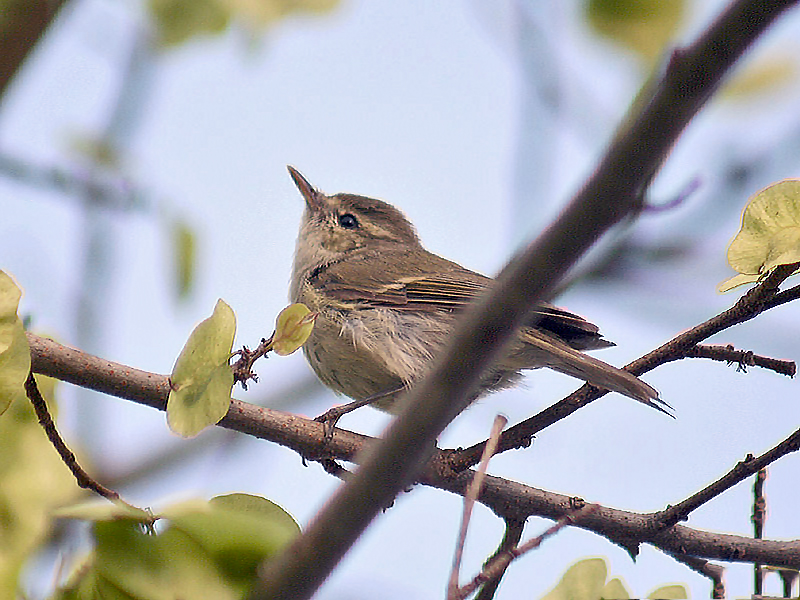
Greenish warbler

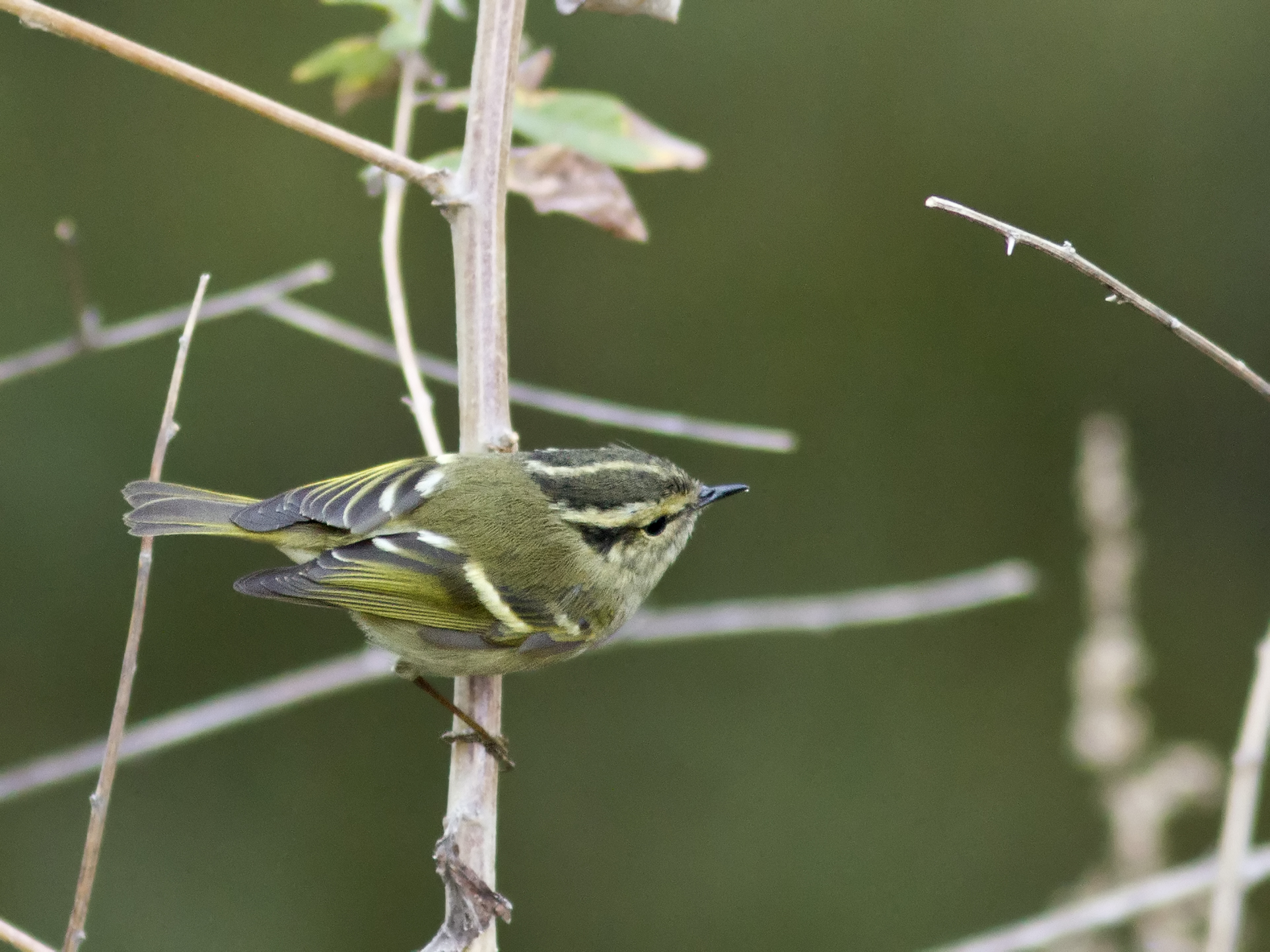
Pale-rumped warbler

Leaf warblers are a family of small insectivorous birds found mostly in Eurasia and ranging into Wallacea and Africa. The species are of various sizes, often green-plumaged above and yellow below, or more subdued with greyish-green to greyish-brown colours.

Common name	Binomial	Comments
Wood warbler	Phylloscopus sibilatrix	(V)
Buff-barred warbler	Phylloscopus pulcher	
Ashy-throated warbler	Phylloscopus maculipennis	
Hume's leaf warbler	Phylloscopus humei	
Yellow-browed warbler	Phylloscopus inornatus	
Brooks's leaf warbler	Phylloscopus subviridis	
Chinese leaf warbler	Phylloscopus yunnanensis	(V)
Lemon-rumped warbler	Phylloscopus chloronotus	
Sichuan leaf warbler	Phylloscopus forresti	(V)
Pallas's leaf warbler	Phylloscopus proregulus	(V)
Tytler's leaf warbler	Phylloscopus tytleri	
Sulphur-bellied warbler	Phylloscopus griseolus	
Tickell's leaf warbler	Phylloscopus affinis	
Smoky warbler	Phylloscopus fuligiventer	
Dusky warbler	Phylloscopus fuscatus	
Plain leaf warbler	Phylloscopus neglectus	
Buff-throated warbler	Phylloscopus subaffinis	(V)
Willow warbler	Phylloscopus trochilus	(V)
Mountain chiffchaff	Phylloscopus sindianus	
Common chiffchaff	Phylloscopus collybita	
White-spectacled warbler	Phylloscopus intermedius	
Grey-cheeked warbler	Phylloscopus poliogenys	
Green-crowned warbler	Phylloscopus burkii	
Grey-crowned warbler	Phylloscopus tephrocephalus	
Whistler's warbler	Phylloscopus whistleri	
Bianchi's warbler	Phylloscopus valentini	(V)
Green warbler	Phylloscopus nitidus	
Two-barred warbler	Phylloscopus plumbeitarsus	(V)
Greenish warbler	Phylloscopus trochiloides	
Large-billed leaf warbler	Phylloscopus magnirostris	
Pale-legged leaf warbler	Phylloscopus tenellipes	(V)
Sakhalin leaf warbler	Phylloscopus borealoides	(V)
Arctic warbler	Phylloscopus borealis	(V)
Chestnut-crowned warbler	Phylloscopus castaniceps	
Yellow-vented warbler	Phylloscopus cantator	
Western crowned warbler	Phylloscopus occipitalis	
Blyth's leaf warbler	Phylloscopus reguloides	
Claudia's leaf warbler	Phylloscopus claudiae	
Grey-hooded warbler	Phylloscopus xanthoschistos	

== Reed warblers, Grauer's warbler, and allies ==
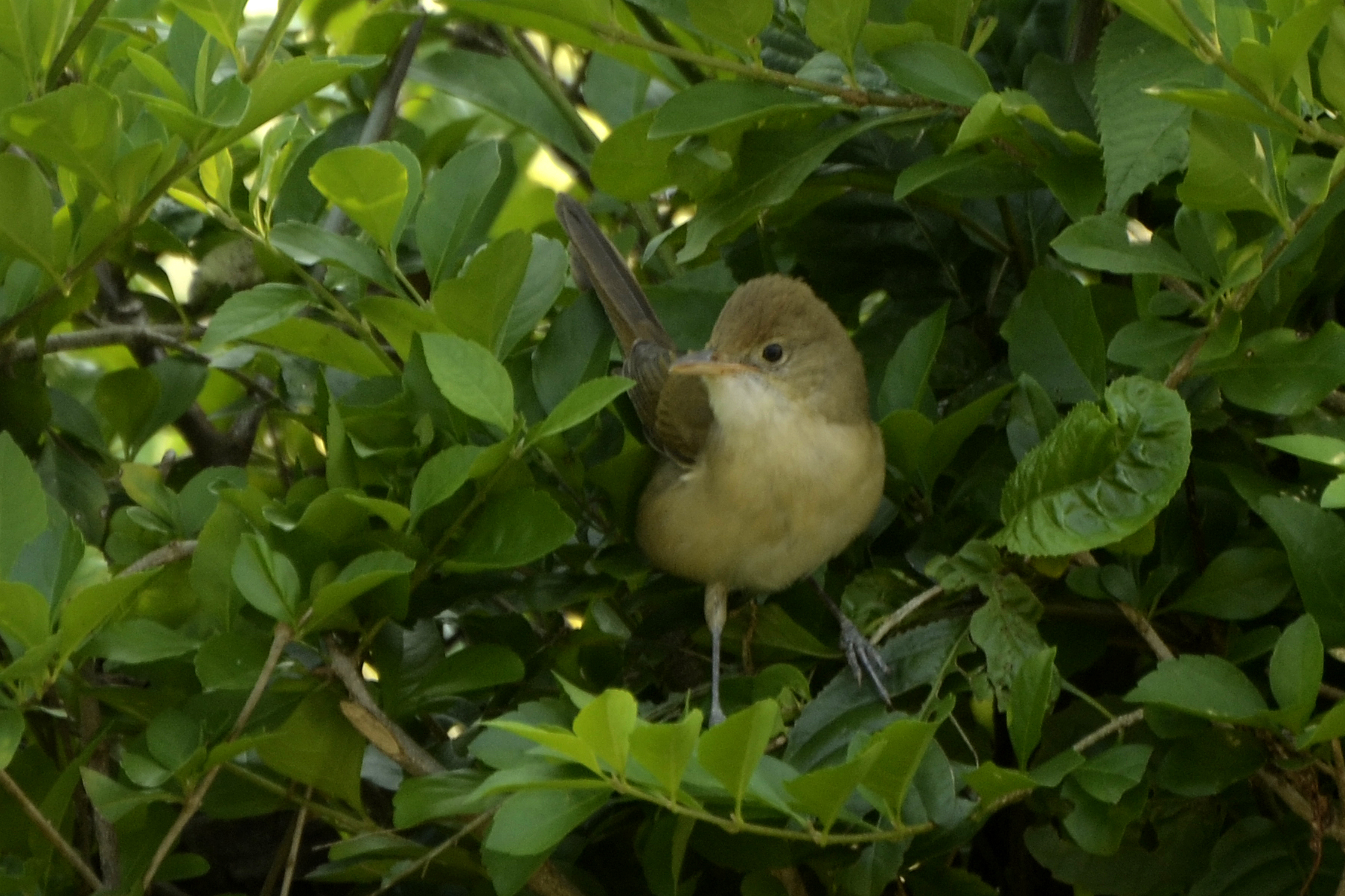
Thick-billed warbler

Order: Passeriformes Family: Acrocephalidae

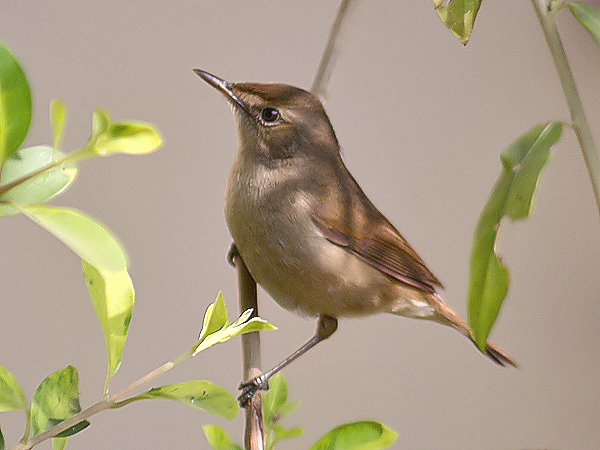
Blyth's reed warbler

The members of this family are usually rather large for "warblers". Most are rather plain olivaceous brown above with much yellow to beige below. They are usually found in open woodland, reedbeds, or tall grass. The family occurs mostly in southern to western Eurasia and surroundings, but it also ranges far into the Pacific, with some species in Africa.

Common name	Binomial	Comments
Great reed warbler	Acrocephalus arundinaceus	(V)
Oriental reed warbler	Acrocephalus orientalis	
Clamorous reed warbler	Acrocephalus stentoreus	
Black-browed reed warbler	Acrocephalus bistrigiceps	
Moustached warbler	Acrocephalus melanopogon	
Sedge warbler	Acrocephalus schoenobaenus	(V)
Blunt-winged warbler	Acrocephalus concinens	
Large-billed reed warbler	Acrocephalus orinus	(V)
Paddyfield warbler	Acrocephalus agricola	
Blyth's reed warbler	Acrocephalus dumetorum	
Thick-billed warbler	Arundinax aedon	
Booted warbler	Iduna caligata	
Sykes's warbler	Iduna rama	

== Grassbirds and allies ==
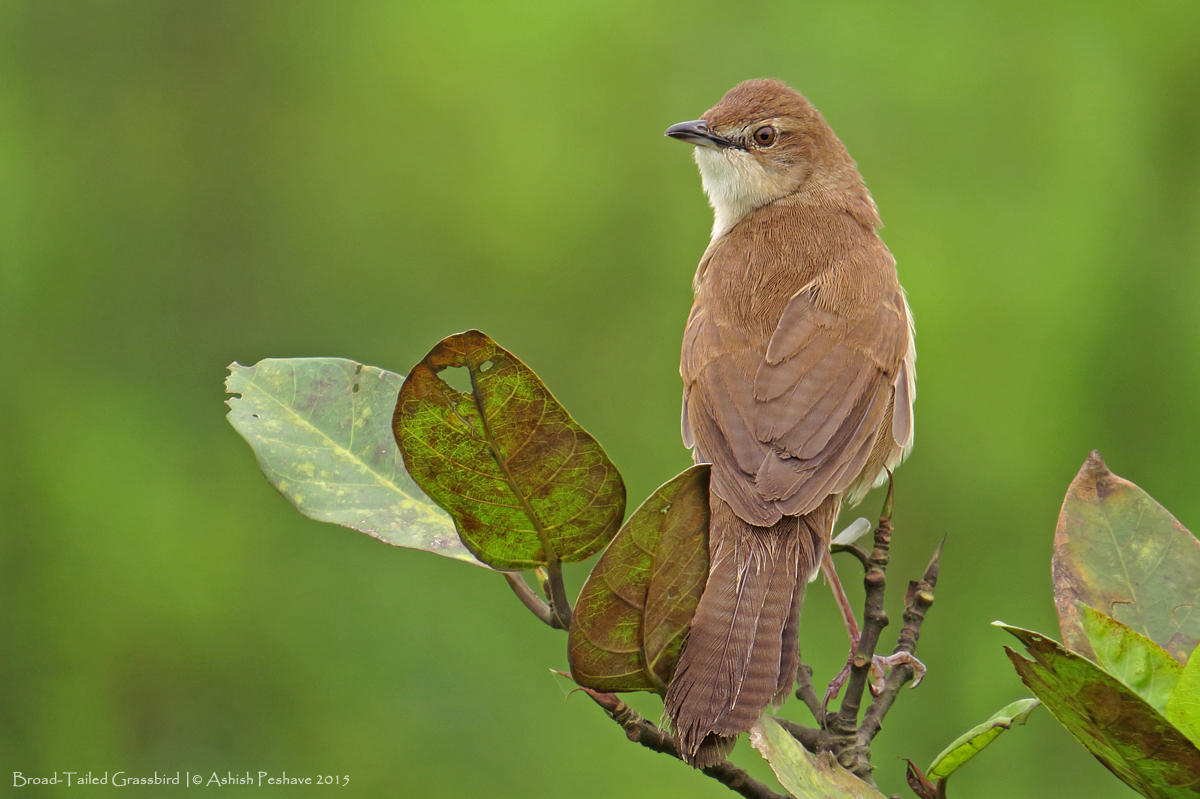
Broad-tailed grassbird

Order: Passeriformes Family: Locustellidae

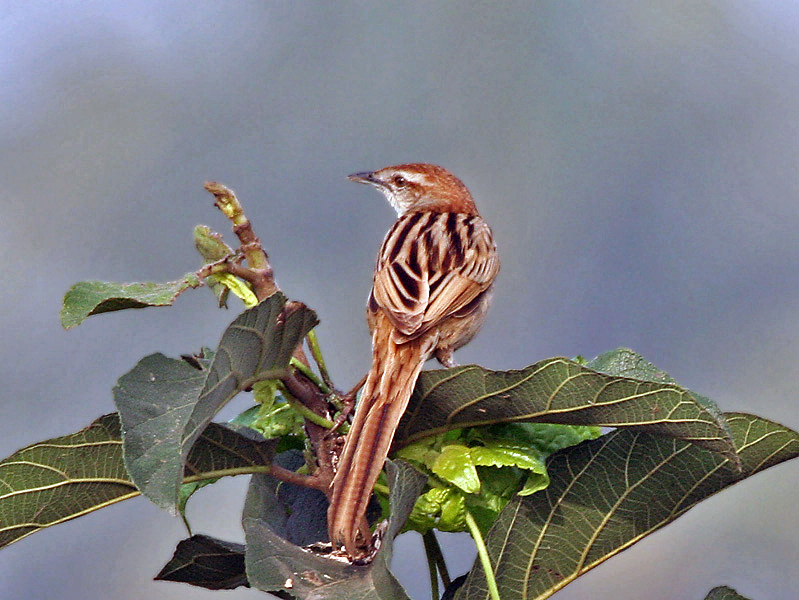
Striated grassbird

Locustellidae are a family of small insectivorous songbirds found mainly in Eurasia, Africa, and the Australian region. They are smallish birds with tails that are usually long and pointed, and tend to be drab brownish or buffy all over.

Common name	Binomial	Comments
Pallas's grasshopper warbler	Helopsaltes certhiola	
Lanceolated warbler	Locustella lanceolata	
Long-billed bush warbler	Locustella major	Near threatened
Brown bush warbler	Locustella luteoventris	
Common grasshopper warbler	Locustella naevia	
Chinese bush warbler	Locustella tacsanowskia	(V)
Baikal bush warbler	Locustella davidi	(V)
West Himalayan bush warbler	Locustella kashmirensis	
Spotted bush warbler	Locustella thoracica	
Russet bush warbler	Locustella mandelli	
Striated grassbird	Megalurus palustris	
Broad-tailed grassbird	Schoenicola platyurus	(E); near threatened
Bristled grassbird	Schoenicola striatus	Vulnerable

== Cisticolas and allies ==
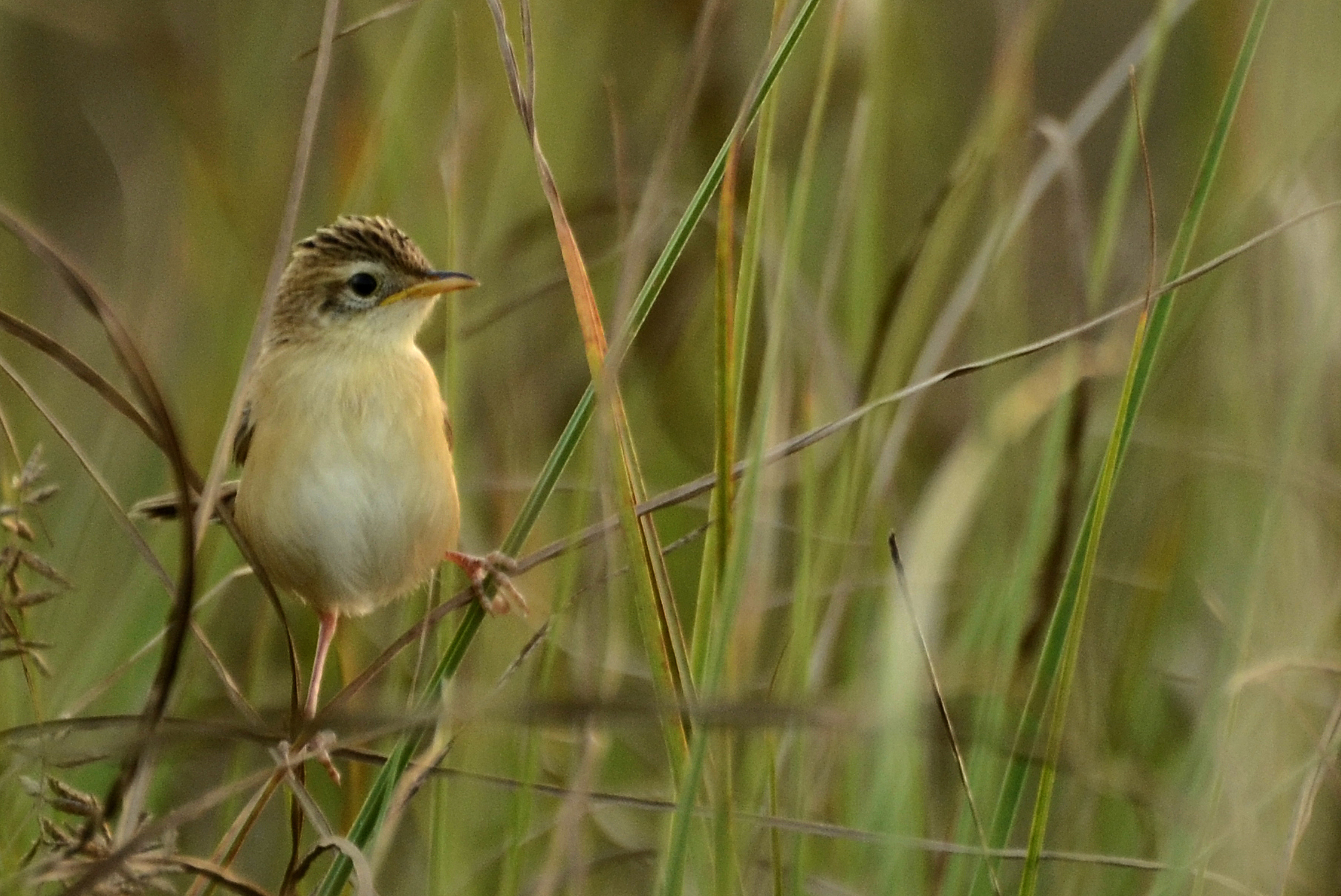
Zitting cisticola

Order: Passeriformes Family: Cisticolidae

The Cisticolidae are warblers found mainly in warmer southern regions of the Old World. They are generally very small birds of drab brown or grey appearance found in open country such as grassland or scrub.

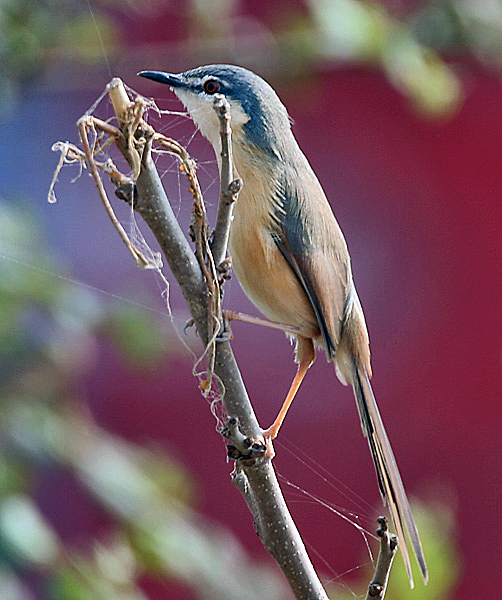
Ashy prinia

Common name	Binomial	Comments
Zitting cisticola	Cisticola juncidis	
Golden-headed cisticola	Cisticola exilis	
Himalayan prinia	Prinia crinigera	Circumscription changed in 2020
Rufous-crowned prinia	Prinia khasiana	
Hill prinia	Prinia superciliaris	
Grey-crowned prinia	Prinia cinereocapilla	Vulnerable
Black-throated prinia	Prinia atrogularis	
Rufous-fronted prinia	Prinia buchanani	
Rufescent prinia	Prinia rufescens	
Grey-breasted prinia	Prinia hodgsonii	
Delicate prinia	Prinia lepida	
Jungle prinia	Prinia sylvatica	
Yellow-bellied prinia	Prinia flaviventris	
Ashy prinia	Prinia socialis	
Plain prinia	Prinia inornata	
Common tailorbird	Orthotomus sutorius	
Dark-necked tailorbird	Orthotomus atrogularis	

== Sylviid warblers ==
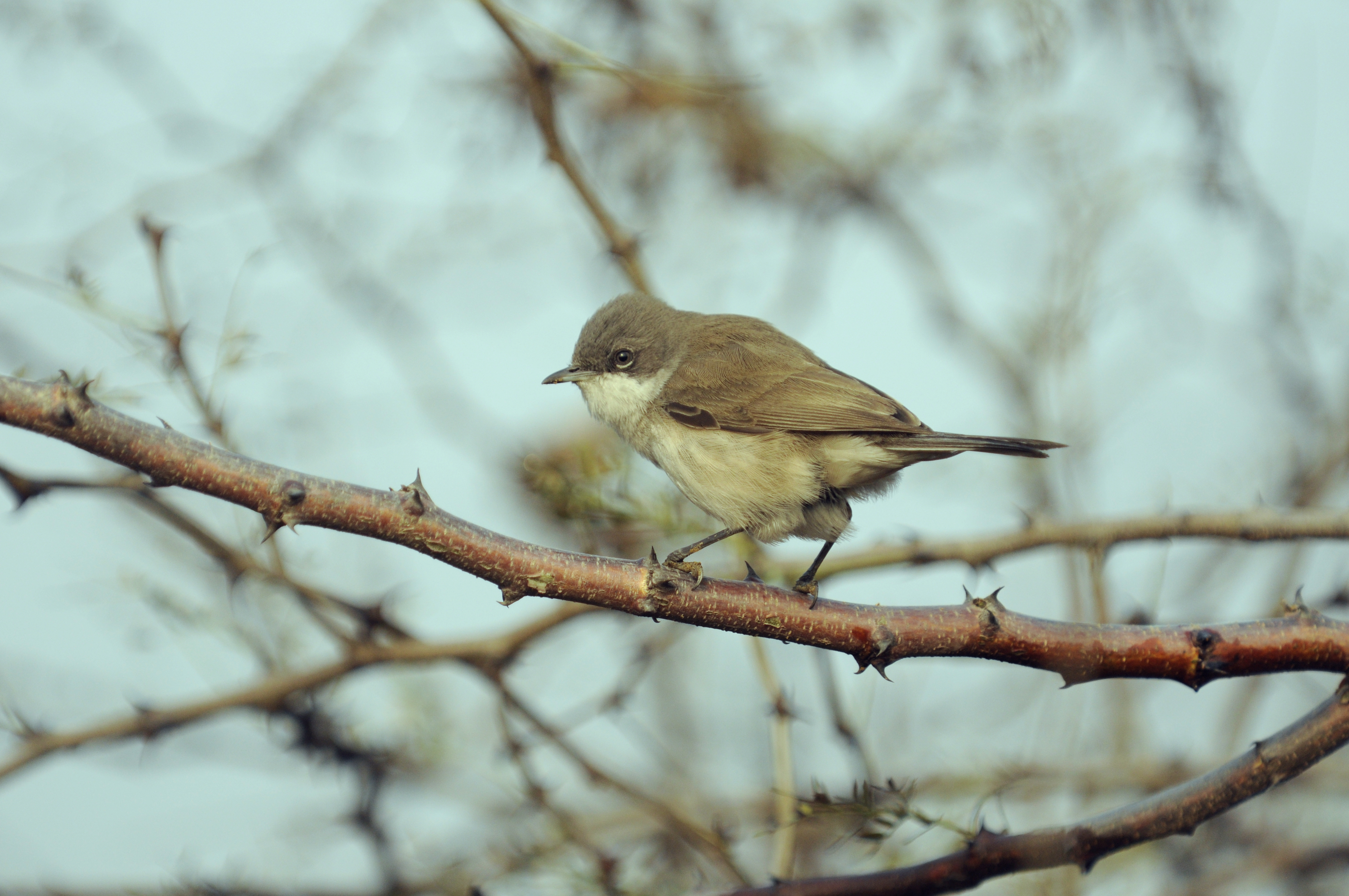
Lesser whitethroat

Order: Passeriformes Family: Sylviidae

The family Sylviidae is a group of small insectivorous passerine birds. They mainly occur as breeding species in Europe, Asia and, to a lesser extent, Africa. Many species are difficult to identify by appearance, but many have distinctive songs.

Common name	Binomial	Comments
Eurasian blackcap	Sylvia atricapilla	(V)
Garden warbler	Sylvia borin	(V)
Barred warbler	Curruca nisoria	(V)
Desert whitethroat	Curruca minula	
Lesser whitethroat	Curruca curruca	
Hume's whitethroat	Curruca althaea	
Eastern Orphean warbler	Curruca crassirostris	
Asian desert warbler	Curruca nana	
Common whitethroat	Curruca communis	

== Parrotbills and allies ==
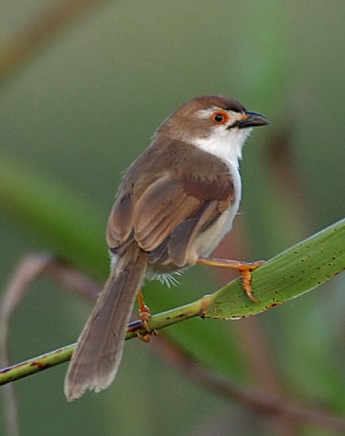
Yellow-eyed babbler

Order: Passeriformes Family: Paradoxornithidae

The parrotbills are a group of peculiar birds which are diverse along the Himalayas east into Southeast Asia, though feral populations exist elsewhere. They are generally small, long-tailed birds which inhabit reedbeds and similar habitat. They feed mainly on seeds of grasses (particularly bamboos), to which their bill is well-adapted.

Common name	Binomial	Comments
Fire-tailed myzornis	Myzornis pyrrhoura	
Golden-breasted fulvetta	Lioparus chrysotis	
Yellow-eyed babbler	Chrysomma sinense	
Jerdon's babbler	Chrysomma altirostre	Vulnerable
White-browed fulvetta	Fulvetta vinipectus	
Brown-throated fulvetta	Fulvetta ludlowi	
Manipur fulvetta	Fulvetta manipurensis	
Black-breasted parrotbill	Paradoxornis flavirostris	Vulnerable
Spot-breasted parrotbill	Paradoxornis guttaticollis	
Great parrotbill	Conostoma aemodium	
Brown parrotbill	Cholornis unicolor	
Grey-headed parrotbill	Psittiparus gularis	
White-breasted parrotbill	Psittiparus ruficeps	
Rufous-headed parrotbill	Psittiparus bakeri	
Fulvous parrotbill	Suthora fulvifrons	
Black-throated parrotbill	Suthora nipalensis	
Pale-billed parrotbill	Chleuasicus atrosuperciliaris	

== White-eyes ==
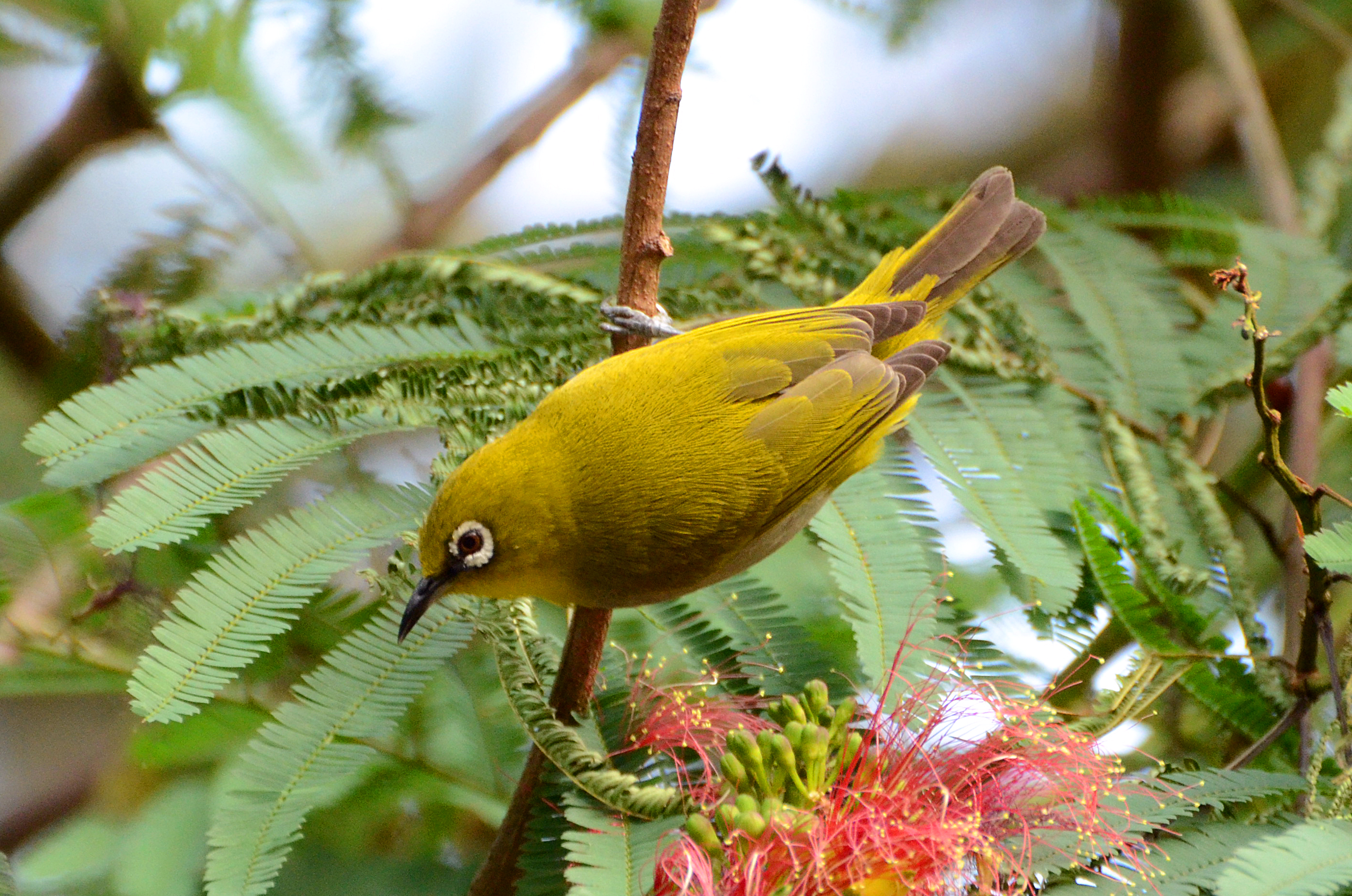
Indian white-eye

Order: Passeriformes Family: Zosteropidae

The white-eyes are small and mostly undistinguished, their plumage above being generally some dull colour like greenish-olive, but some species have a white or bright yellow throat, breast or lower parts, and several have buff flanks. As their name suggests, many species have a white ring around each eye.

Common name	Binomial	Comments
Striated yuhina	Staphida castaniceps	
Black-chinned yuhina	Yuhina nigrimenta	
Whiskered yuhina	Yuhina flavicollis	
White-naped yuhina	Yuhina bakeri	
Stripe-throated yuhina	Yuhina gularis	
Rufous-vented yuhina	Yuhina occipitalis	
Chestnut-flanked white-eye	Zosterops erythropleurus	(V)
Indian white-eye	Zosterops palpebrosus	

== Babblers and scimitar babblers ==
Order: Passeriformes Family: Timaliidae

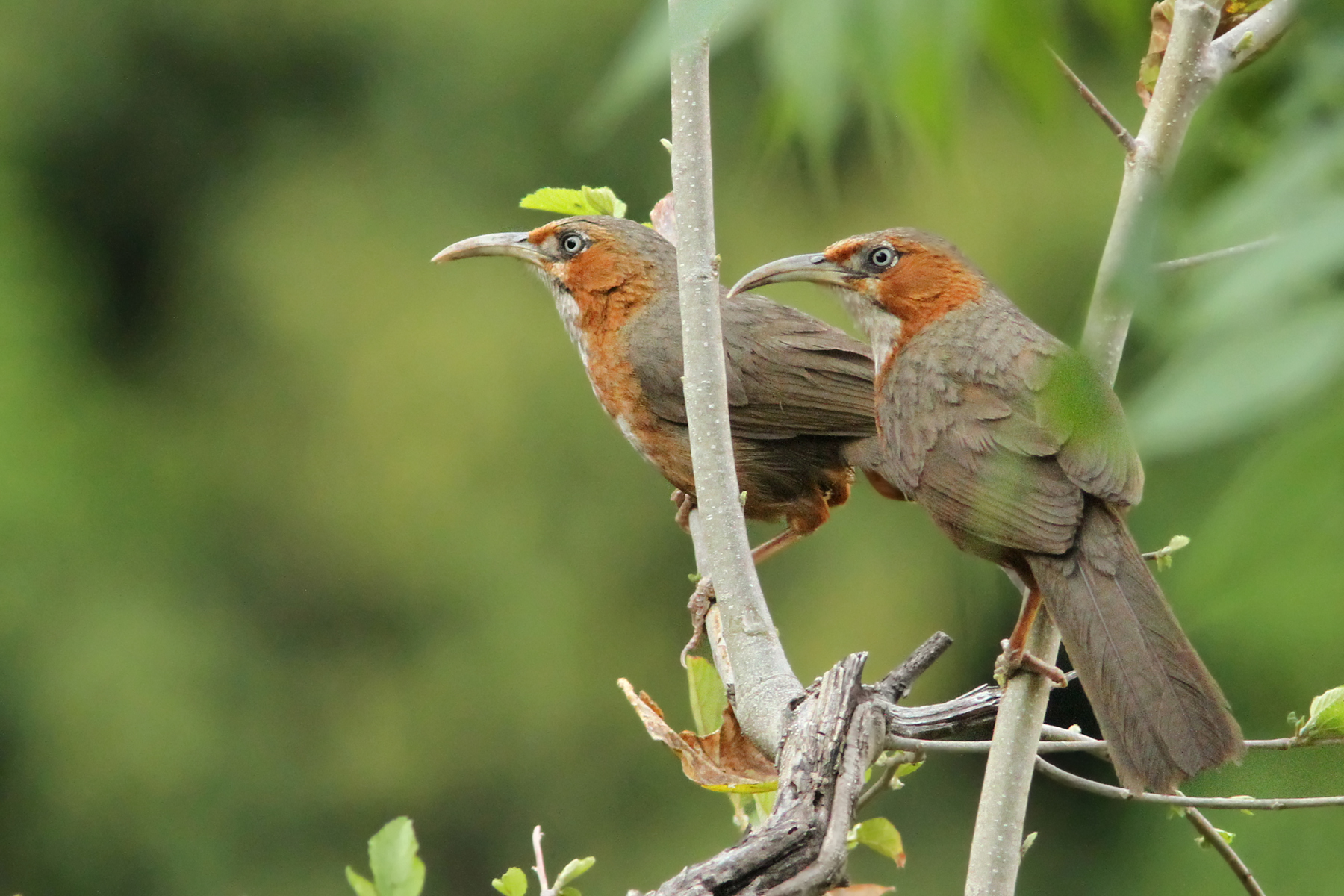
Rusty-cheeked scimitar babbler

The babblers, or timaliids, are somewhat diverse in size and colour, but are characterised by soft fluffy plumage.

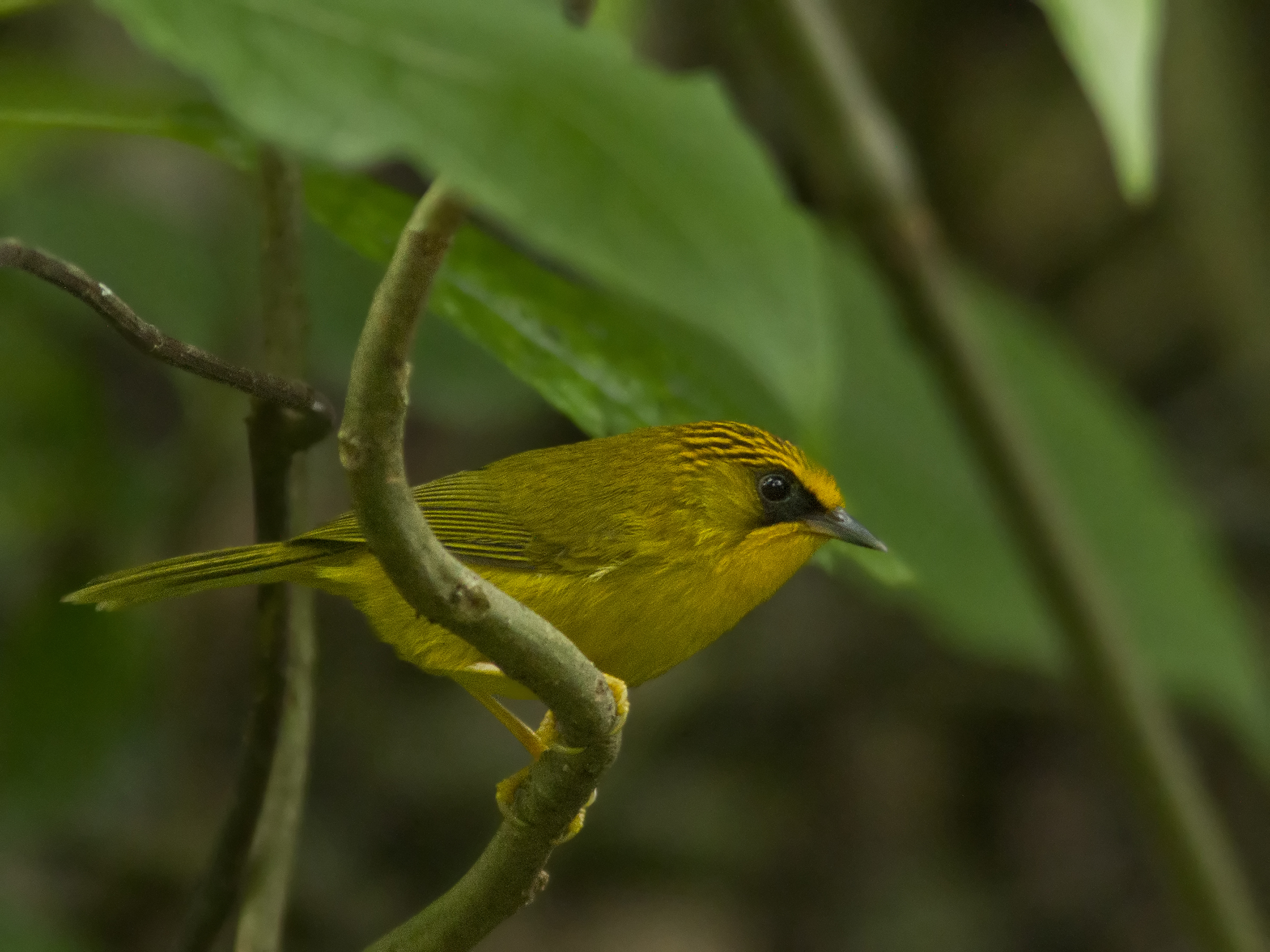
Golden babbler

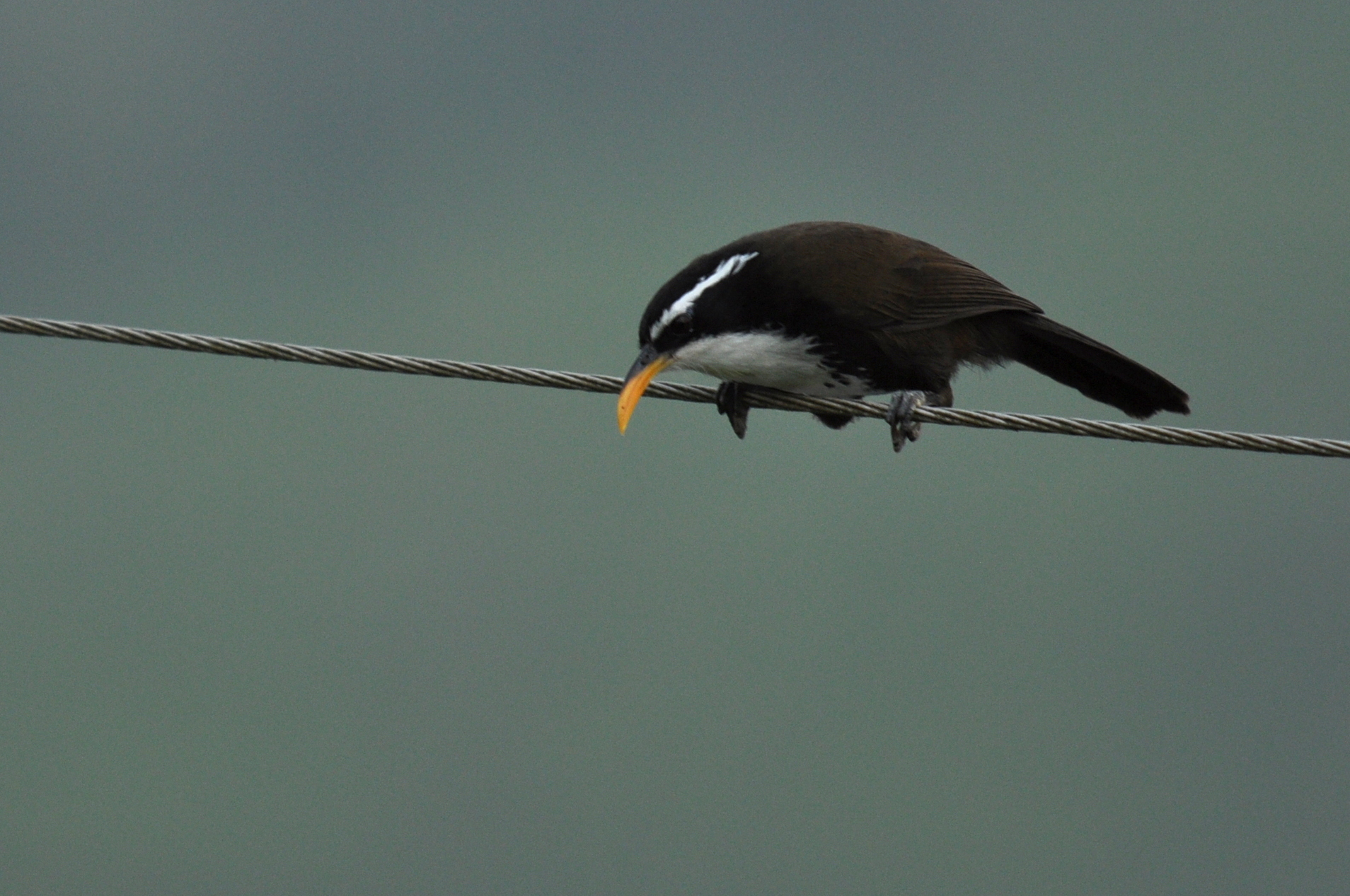
Indian scimitar babbler

Common name	Binomial	Comments
Chestnut-capped babbler	Timalia pileata	
Tawny-bellied babbler	Dumetia hyperythra	
Dark-fronted babbler	Dumetia atriceps	
Pin-striped tit-babbler	Mixornis gularis	
Golden babbler	Cyanoderma chrysaeum	
Black-chinned babbler	Cyanoderma pyrrhops	
Rufous-capped babbler	Cyanoderma ruficeps	
Buff-chested babbler	Cyanoderma ambiguum	
Rufous-throated wren-babbler	Spelaeornis caudatus	
Mishmi wren-babbler	Spelaeornis badeigularis	(E); near threatened
Bar-winged wren-babbler	Spelaeornis troglodytoides	
Naga wren-babbler	Spelaeornis chocolatinus	Vulnerable
Chin Hills wren-babbler	Spelaeornis oatesi	
Tawny-breasted wren-babbler	Spelaeornis longicaudatus	(E); near threatened
Grey-bellied wren-babbler	Spelaeornis reptatus	(V)
Brown-crowned scimitar babbler	Pomatorhinus phayrei	
Coral-billed scimitar babbler	Pomatorhinus ferruginosus	
Red-billed scimitar babbler	Pomatorhinus ochraceiceps	
Slender-billed scimitar babbler	Pomatorhinus superciliaris	
Streak-breasted scimitar babbler	Pomatorhinus ruficollis	
White-browed scimitar babbler	Pomatorhinus schisticeps	
Indian scimitar babbler	Pomatorhinus horsfieldii	
Large scimitar babbler	Erythrogenys hypoleucos	
Rusty-cheeked scimitar babbler	Erythrogenys erythrogenys	
Spot-breasted scimitar babbler	Erythrogenys mcclellandi	
Grey-throated babbler	Stachyris nigriceps	
Sikkim wedge-billed babbler	Stachyris humei	Near threatened
Cachar wedge-billed babbler	Stachyris roberti	Near threatened
Snowy-throated babbler	Stachyris oglei	(E); near threatened

== Ground babblers ==
Order: Passeriformes Family: Pellorneidae

These small to medium-sized songbirds have soft fluffy plumage but are otherwise rather diverse. Members of the genus Illadopsis are found in forests, but some other genera are birds of scrublands.

Common name	Binomial	Comments
Indian grassbird	Graminicola bengalensis	Near threatened
White-hooded babbler	Gampsorhynchus rufulus	
Yellow-throated fulvetta	Schoeniparus cinereus	
Rufous-winged fulvetta	Schoeniparus castaneceps	
Rufous-throated fulvetta	Schoeniparus rufogularis	
Rusty-capped fulvetta	Schoeniparus dubius	
Puff-throated babbler	Pellorneum ruficeps	
Marsh babbler	Pellorneum palustre	(E); vulnerable
Spot-throated babbler	Pellorneum albiventre	
Buff-breasted babbler	Pellorneum tickelli	
Rufous-vented grass babbler	Laticilla burnesii	Near threatened
Swamp grass babbler	Laticilla cinerascens	Endangered
Abbott's babbler	Malacocincla abbotti	
Streaked wren-babbler	Gypsophila brevicaudata	
Eyebrowed wren-babbler	Napothera epilepidota	
Long-billed wren-babbler	Napothera malacoptila	

== Alcippe fulvettas ==
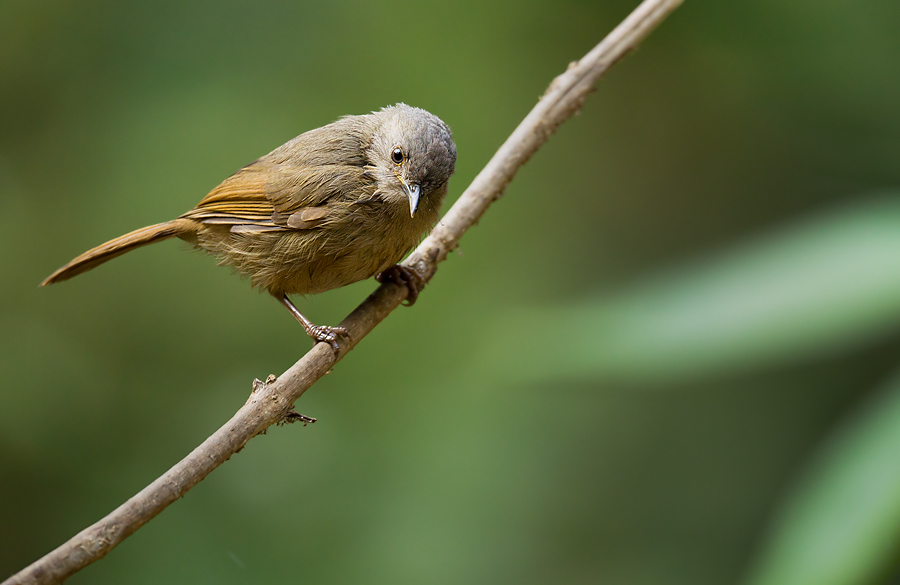
Brown-cheeked fulvetta or Quaker babbler

Order: Passeriformes Family: Alcippeidae

The genus once included many other fulvettas and was previously placed in families Pellorneidae or Timaliidae.

Common name	Binomial	Comments
Brown-cheeked fulvetta	Alcippe poioicephala	
Nepal fulvetta	Alcippe nipalensis	

== Laughingthrushes and allies ==
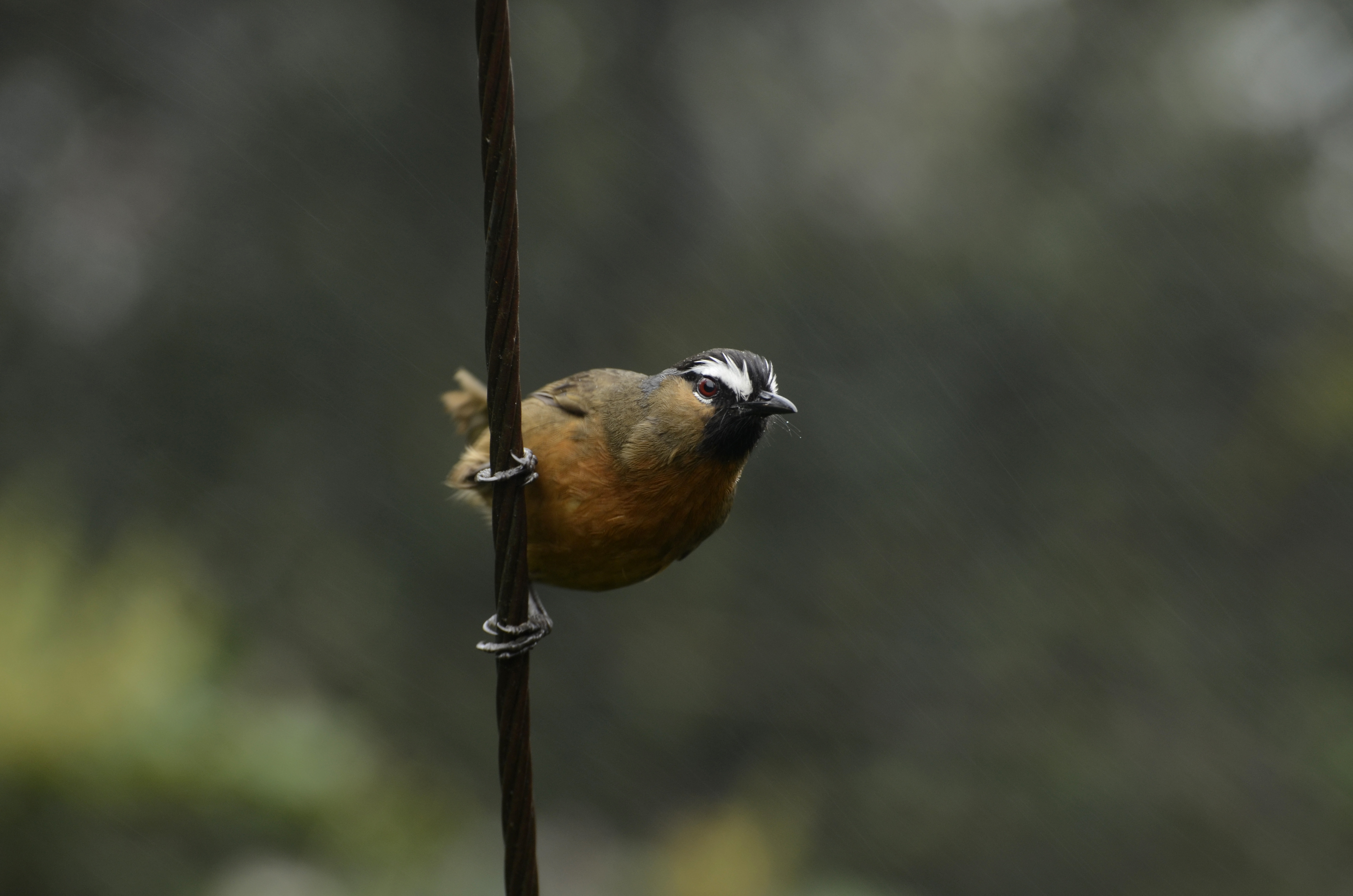
Nilgiri laughingthrush

Order: Passeriformes Family: Leiothrichidae

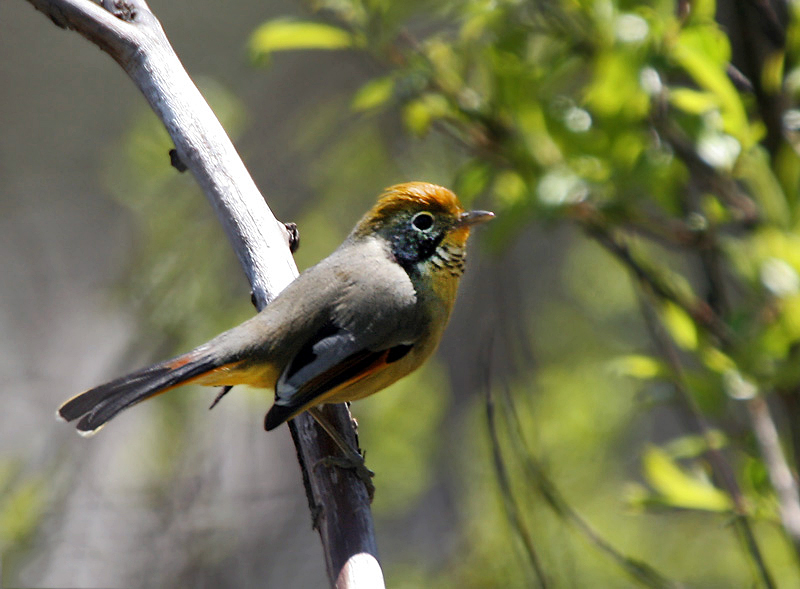
Bar-throated minla

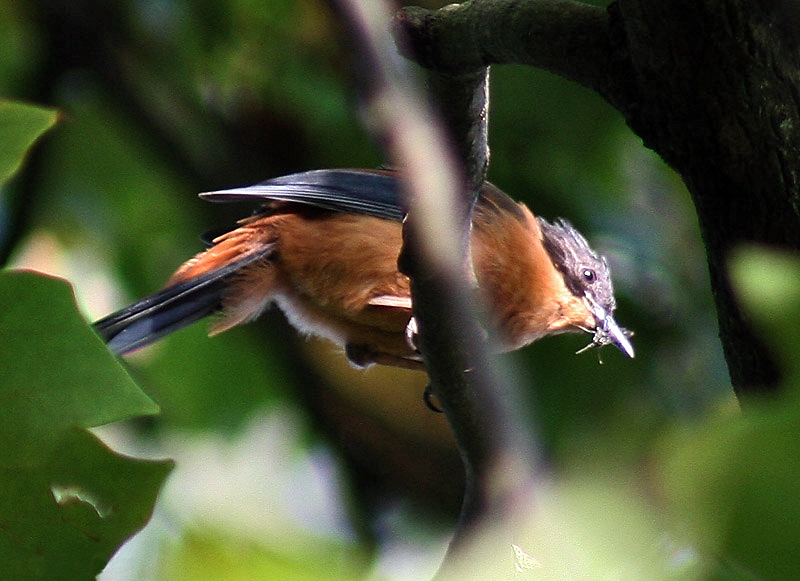
Rufous sibia

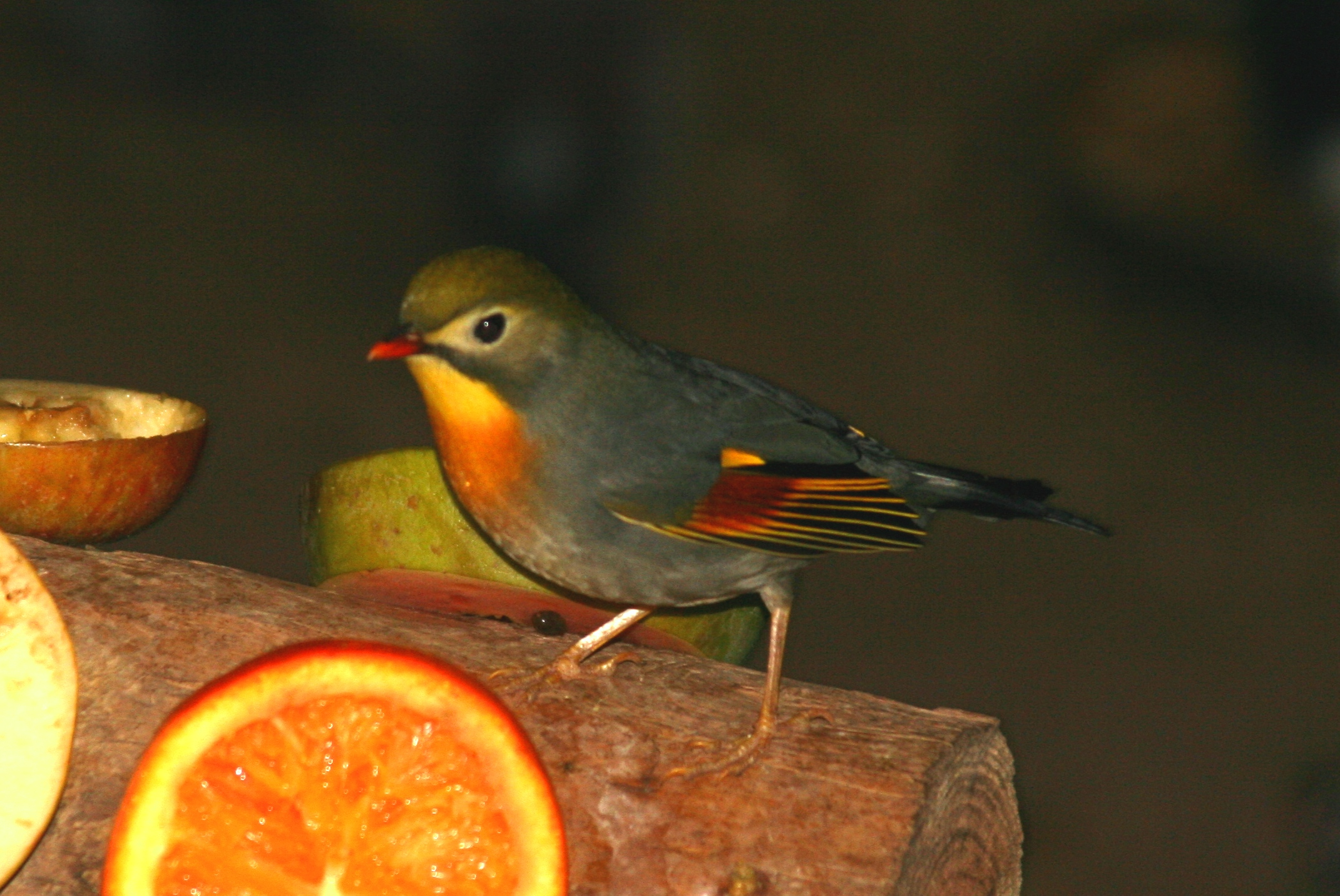
Red-billed leiothrix

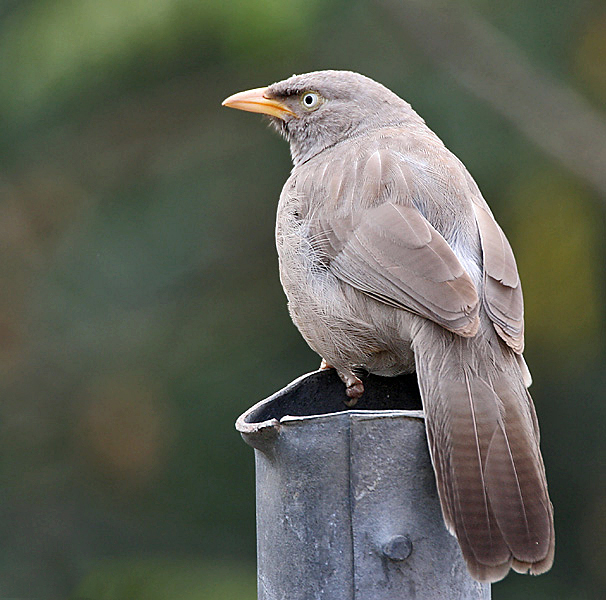
Jungle babbler

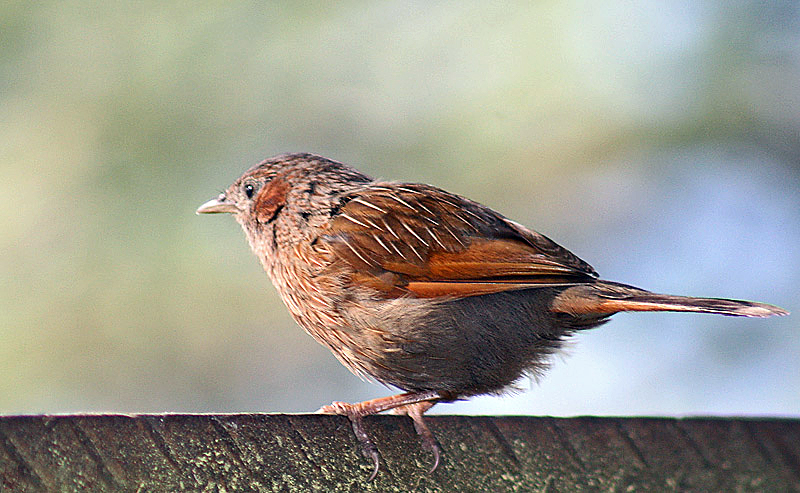
Streaked laughingthrush

The members of this family are diverse in size and colour, though those of the genera Argya and Turdoides tend to be brown or greyish. The family is found in Africa, India, and southeast Asia.

Common name	Binomial	Comments
Striated laughingthrush	Grammatoptila striata	
Himalayan cutia	Cutia nipalensis	
Scaly laughingthrush	Trochalopteron subunicolor	
Brown-capped laughingthrush	Trochalopteron austeni	
Blue-winged laughingthrush	Trochalopteron squamatum	
Streaked laughingthrush	Trochalopteron lineatum	
Bhutan laughingthrush	Trochalopteron imbricatum	
Striped laughingthrush	Trochalopteron virgatum	
Variegated laughingthrush	Trochalopteron variegatum	
Black-faced laughingthrush	Trochalopteron affine	
Elliot's laughingthrush	Trochalopteron elliotii	
Chestnut-crowned laughingthrush	Trochalopteron erythrocephalum	
Assam laughingthrush	Trochalopteron chrysopterum	
Banasura laughingthrush	Montecincla jerdoni	(E); endangered
Nilgiri laughingthrush	Montecincla cachinnans	(E); near threatened
Palani laughingthrush	Montecincla fairbanki	(E); near threatened
Ashambu laughingthrush	Montecincla meridionalis	(E); vulnerable
Long-tailed sibia	Heterophasia picaoides	
Rufous sibia	Heterophasia capistrata	
Beautiful sibia	Heterophasia pulchella	
Grey sibia	Heterophasia gracilis	
Hoary-throated barwing	Actinodura nipalensis	
Streak-throated barwing	Actinodura waldeni	
Blue-winged minla	Actinodura cyanouroptera	
Bar-throated minla	Actinodura strigula	
Rusty-fronted barwing	Actinodura egertoni	
Red-billed leiothrix	Leiothrix lutea	
Silver-eared mesia	Leiothrix argentauris	
Red-tailed minla	Minla ignotincta	
Rufous-backed sibia	Leioptila annectens	
Bugun liocichla	Liocichla bugunorum	(E); critically endangered
Red-faced liocichla	Liocichla phoenicea	
Large grey babbler	Argya malcolmi	
Slender-billed babbler	Argya longirostris	Vulnerable
Rufous babbler	Argya subrufa	(E)
Jungle babbler	Argya striata	
Yellow-billed babbler	Argya affinis	
Common babbler	Argya caudata	
Striated babbler	Argya earlei	
Spot-breasted laughingthrush	Garrulax merulinus	
Lesser necklaced laughingthrush	Garrulax monileger	
White-crested laughingthrush	Garrulax leucolophus	
Rufous-chinned laughingthrush	Ianthocincla rufogularis	
Moustached laughingthrush	Ianthocincla cineracea	
Spotted laughingthrush	Ianthocincla ocellata	
Wynaad laughingthrush	Pterorhinus delesserti	(E)
Rufous-vented laughingthrush	Pterorhinus gularis	
Yellow-throated laughingthrush	Pterorhinus galbanus	
Rufous-necked laughingthrush	Pterorhinus ruficollis	
Chestnut-backed laughingthrush	Pterorhinus nuchalis	Near threatened
White-browed laughingthrush	Pterorhinus sannio	
Greater necklaced laughingthrush	Pterorhinus pectoralis	
Mount Victoria babax	Pterorhinus woodi	(V)
White-throated laughingthrush	Pterorhinus albogularis	
Grey-sided laughingthrush	Pterorhinus caerulatus	

== Fairy-bluebirds ==
Order: Passeriformes Family: Irenidae

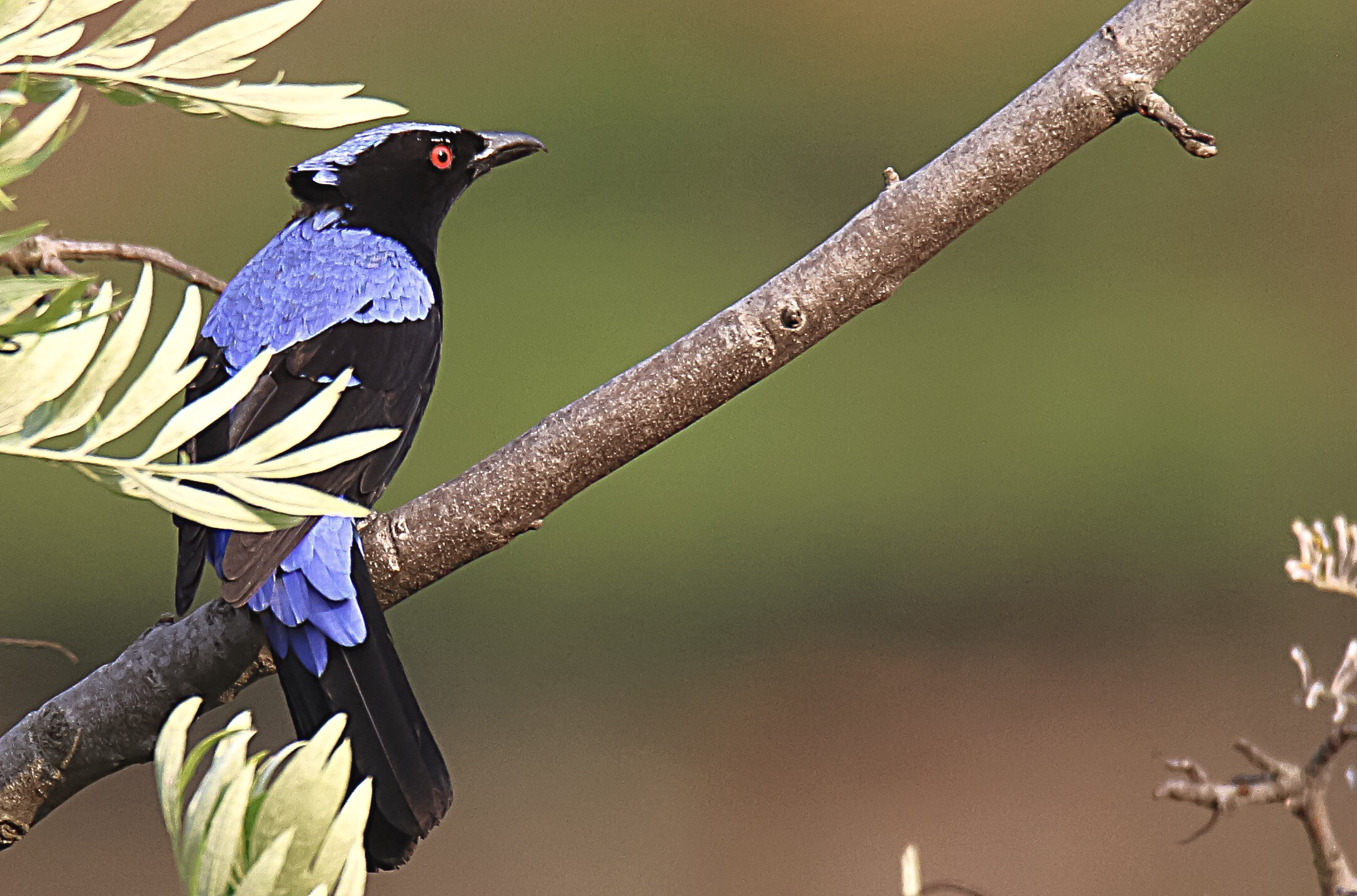
Asian fairy-bluebird

The fairy-bluebirds are bulbul-like birds of open forest or thorn scrub. The males are dark blue and the females a duller green. There is one species which occurs in India.

Common name	Binomial	Comments
Asian fairy-bluebird	Irena puella	

== Goldcrests and kinglets ==
Order: Passeriformes Family: Regulidae

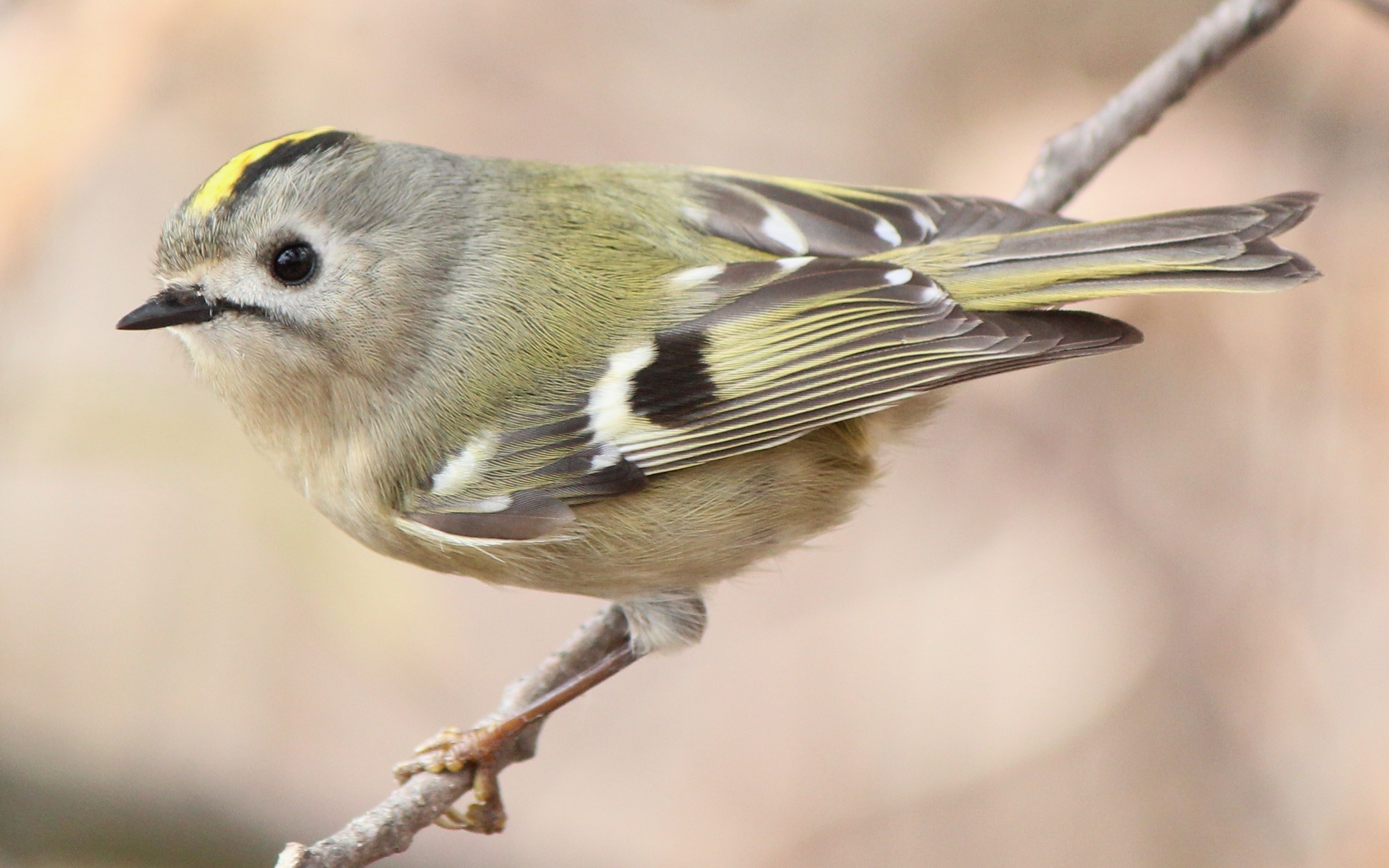
Goldcrest

The crests, also called kinglets in North America, are a small group of birds formerly sometimes included in the Old World warblers, but now given family status because they are genetically distinct from them. There is one species which occurs in India.

Common name	Binomial	Comments
Goldcrest	Regulus regulus	

== Elachura ==
Order: Passeriformes Family: Elachuridae

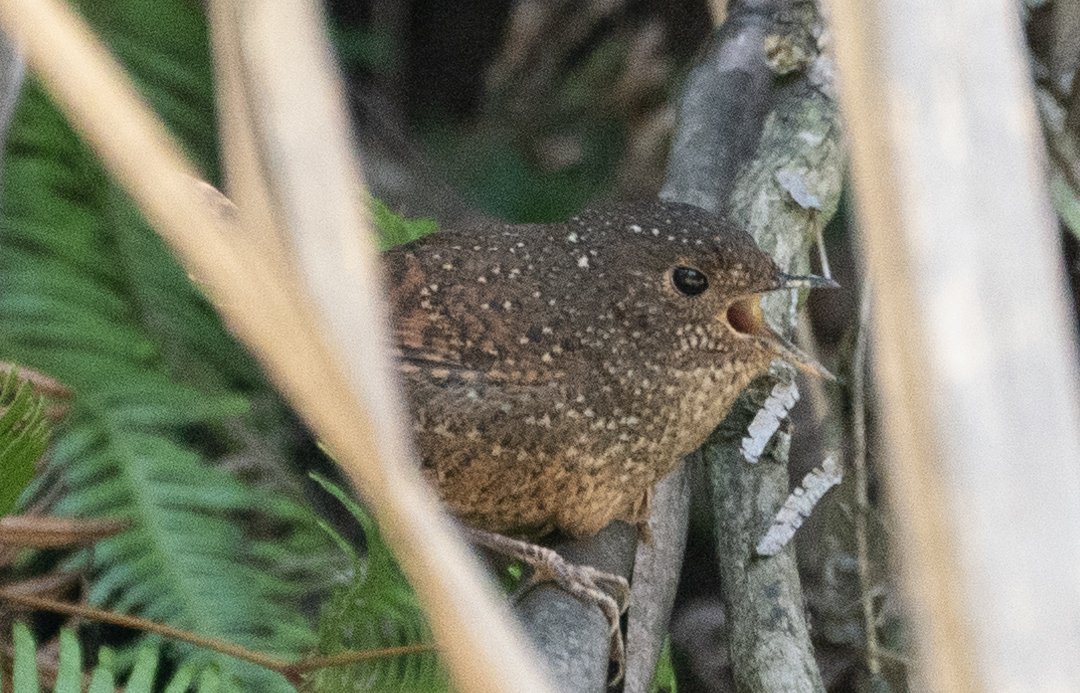
Spotted elachura

This species, the only one in its family, inhabits forest undergrowth throughout Southeast Asia.

Common name	Binomial	Comments
Spotted elachura	Elachura formosa	

== Wrens ==
Order: Passeriformes Family: Troglodytidae

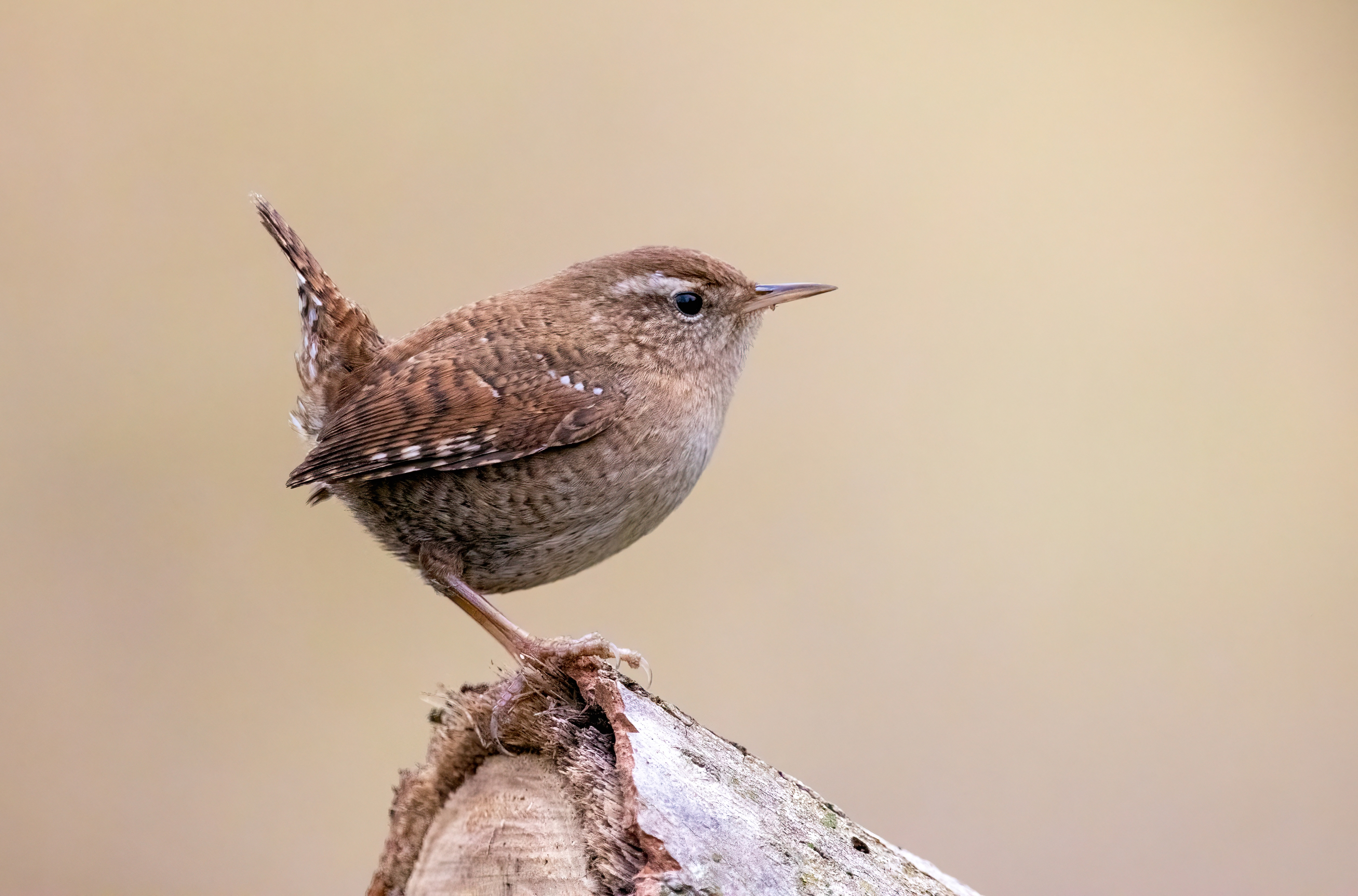
Eurasian wren

The wrens are mainly small and inconspicuous except for their loud songs. These birds have short wings and thin down-turned bills. Several species often hold their tails upright. All are insectivorous. There is one species which occurs in India.

Common name	Binomial	Comments
Eurasian wren	Troglodytes troglodytes	

== Nuthatches ==
Order: Passeriformes Family: Sittidae

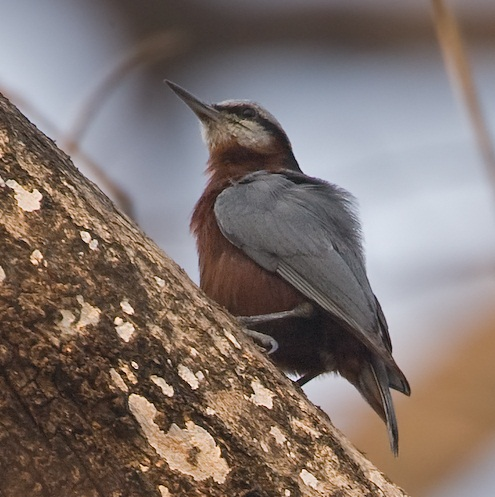
Chestnut-bellied nuthatch

Nuthatches are small woodland birds. They have the unusual ability to climb down trees head first, unlike other birds which can only go upwards. Nuthatches have big heads, short tails and powerful bills and feet.

Common name	Binomial	Comments
White-cheeked nuthatch	Sitta leucopsis	
Beautiful nuthatch	Sitta formosa	Vulnerable
Velvet-fronted nuthatch	Sitta frontalis	
Yunnan nuthatch	Sitta yunnanensis	(V)
White-tailed nuthatch	Sitta himalayensis	
Chestnut-vented nuthatch	Sitta nagaensis	
Kashmir nuthatch	Sitta cashmirensis	
Indian nuthatch	Sitta castanea	
Chestnut-bellied nuthatch	Sitta cinnamoventris	

== Wallcreeper ==
Order: Passeriformes Family: Tichodromidae

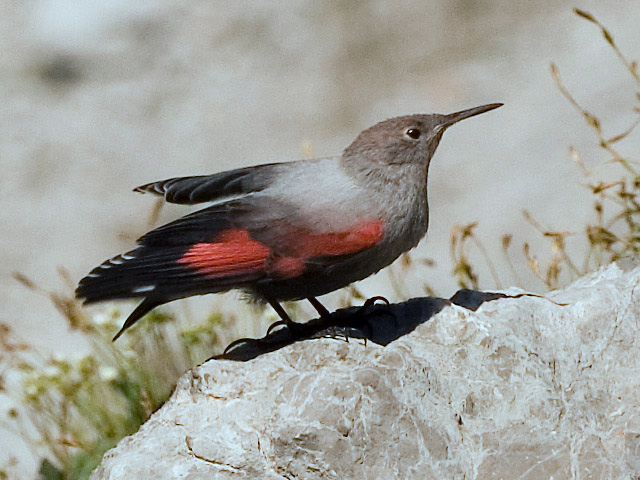
Wallcreeper

The wallcreeper is a small bird related to the nuthatch family, which has stunning crimson, grey and black plumage.

Common name	Binomial	Comments
Wallcreeper	Tichodroma muraria	

== Treecreepers ==
Order: Passeriformes Family: Certhiidae

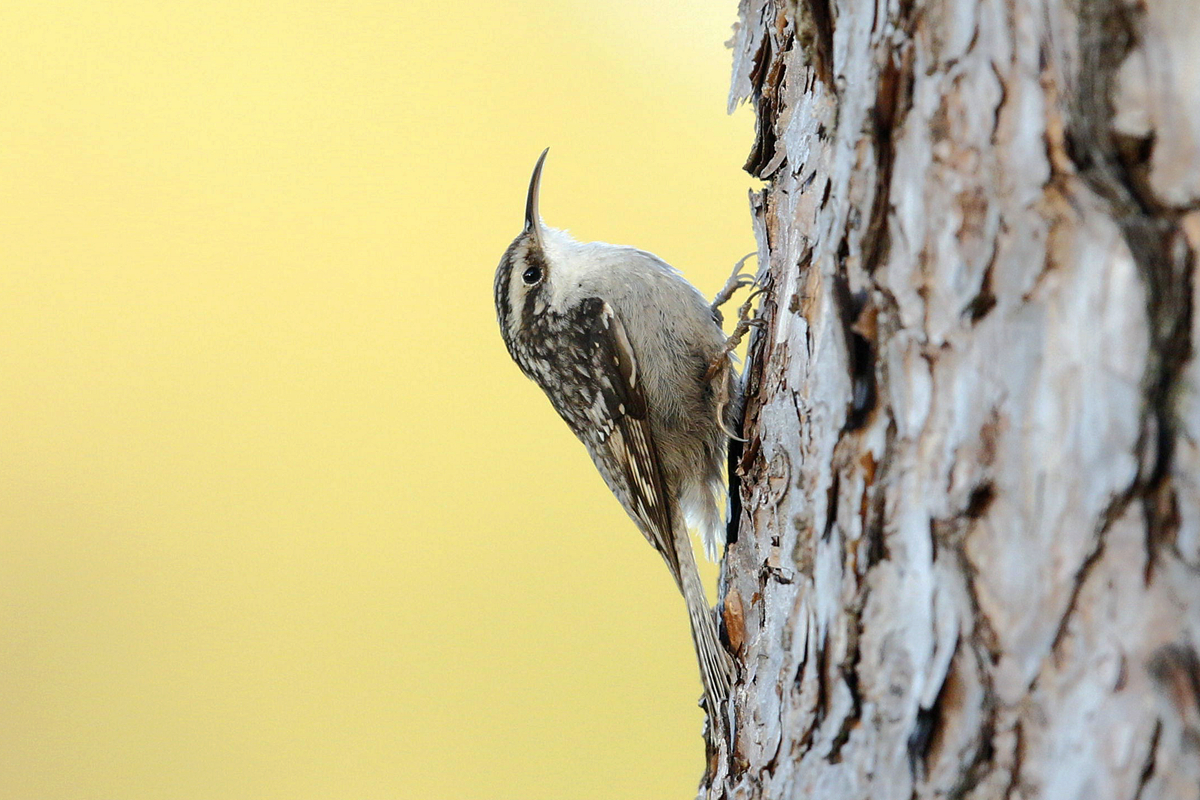
Bar-tailed treecreeper

Treecreepers are small woodland birds, brown above and white below. They have thin pointed down-curved bills, which they use to extricate insects from bark. They have stiff tail feathers, like woodpeckers, which they use to support themselves on vertical trees.

Common name	Binomial	Comments
Hodgson's treecreeper	Certhia hodgsoni	
Bar-tailed treecreeper	Certhia himalayana	
Rusty-flanked treecreeper	Certhia nipalensis	
Sikkim treecreeper	Certhia discolor	
Hume's treecreeper	Certhia manipurensis	

== Spotted creepers ==
Order: Passeriformes Family: Salpornithidae

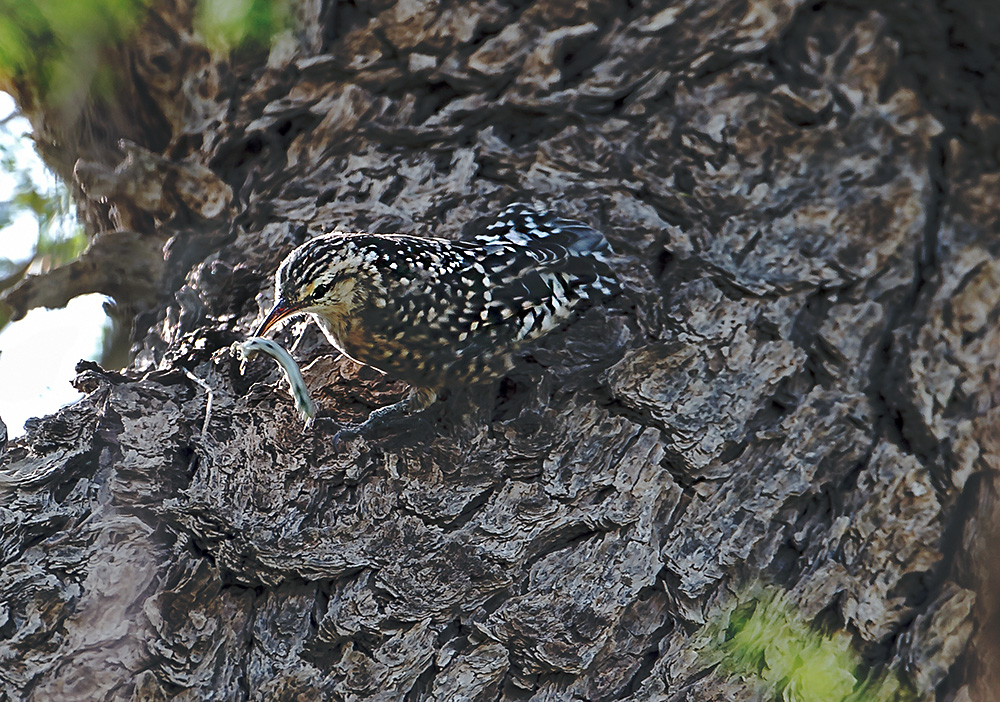
Indian spotted creeper

Spotted creepers are similar to the treecreepers of Certhiidae but lack the characteristic stiffened tail feathers. They build cup nests joined together with spider webs and decorated with lichen.

Common name	Binomial	Comments
Indian spotted creeper	Salpornis spilonota	

== Starlings and rhabdornis ==
Order: Passeriformes Family: Sturnidae

Starlings are small to medium-sized passerine birds. Their flight is strong and direct and they are very gregarious. Their preferred habitat is fairly open country. They eat insects and fruit. Plumage is typically dark with a metallic sheen.

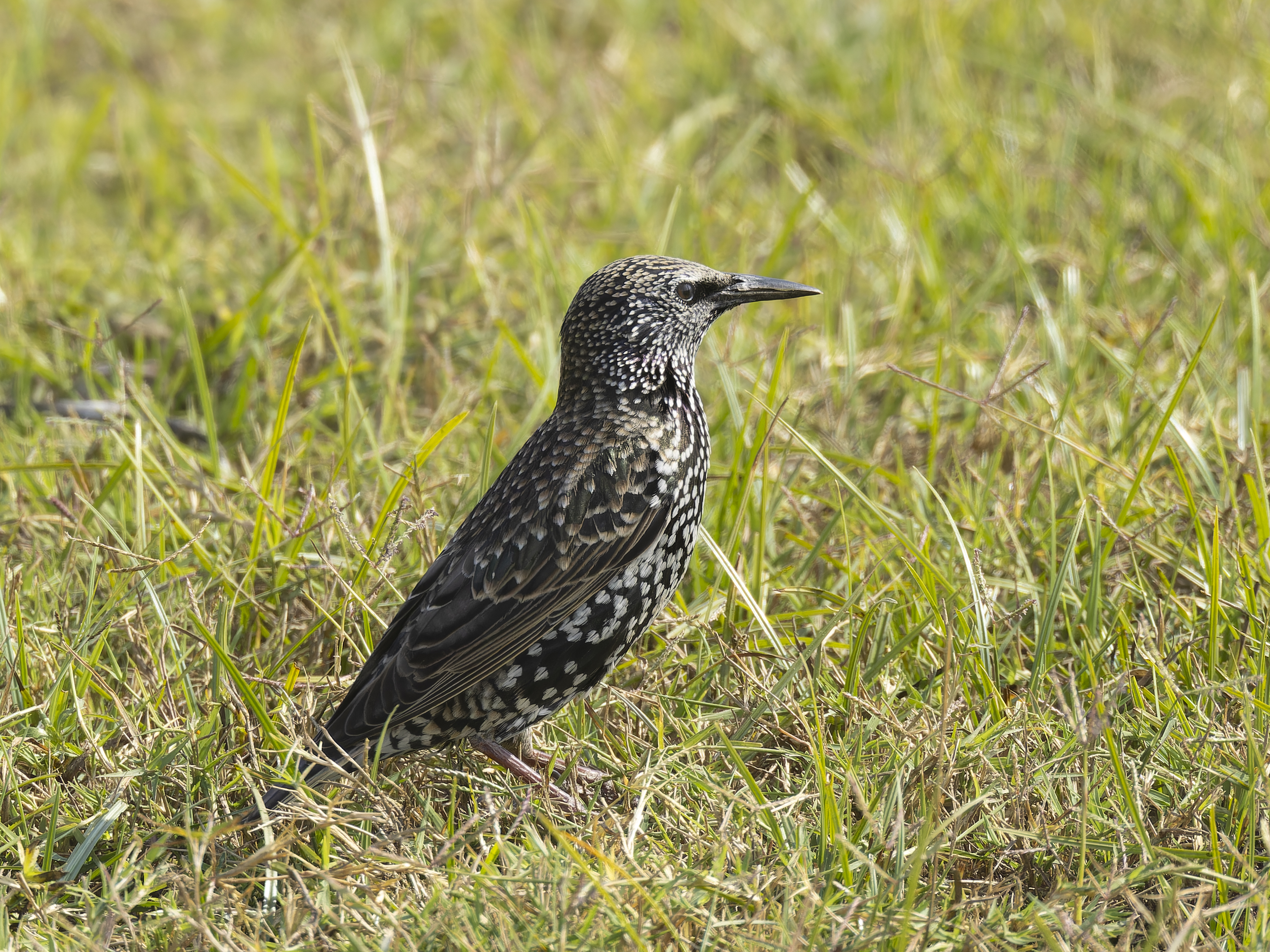
Common starling

Common name	Binomial	Comments
Asian glossy starling	Aplonis panayensis	
Spot-winged starling	Saroglossa spilopterus	
Golden-crested myna	Ampeliceps coronatus	
Common hill myna	Gracula religiosa	
Southern hill myna	Gracula indica	
Great myna	Acridotheres grandis	
Jungle myna	Acridotheres fuscus	
Collared myna	Acridotheres albocinctus	
Bank myna	Acridotheres ginginianus	
Common myna	Acridotheres tristis	
Red-billed starling	Spodiopsar sericeus	(V)
White-cheeked starling	Spodiopsar cineraceus	(V)
Indian pied myna	Gracupica contra	
Daurian starling	Agropsar sturninus	
Chestnut-cheeked starling	Agropsar philippensis	(V)
White-shouldered starling	Sturnia sinensis	(V)
Chestnut-tailed starling	Sturnia malabarica	
White-headed starling	Sturnia erythropygia	(E)
Malabar starling	Sturnia blythii	(E)
Brahminy starling	Sturnia pagodarum	
Rosy starling	Pastor roseus	
Common starling	Sturnus vulgaris	

== Thrushes ==
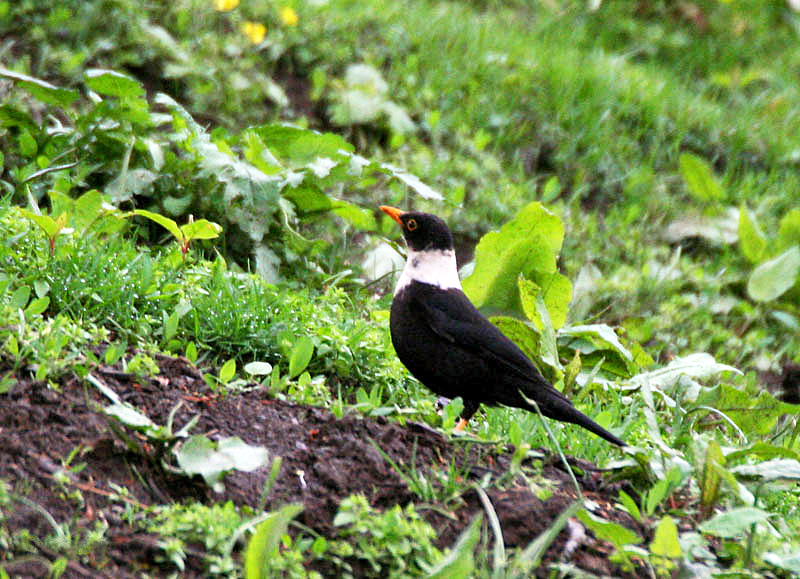
White-collared blackbird

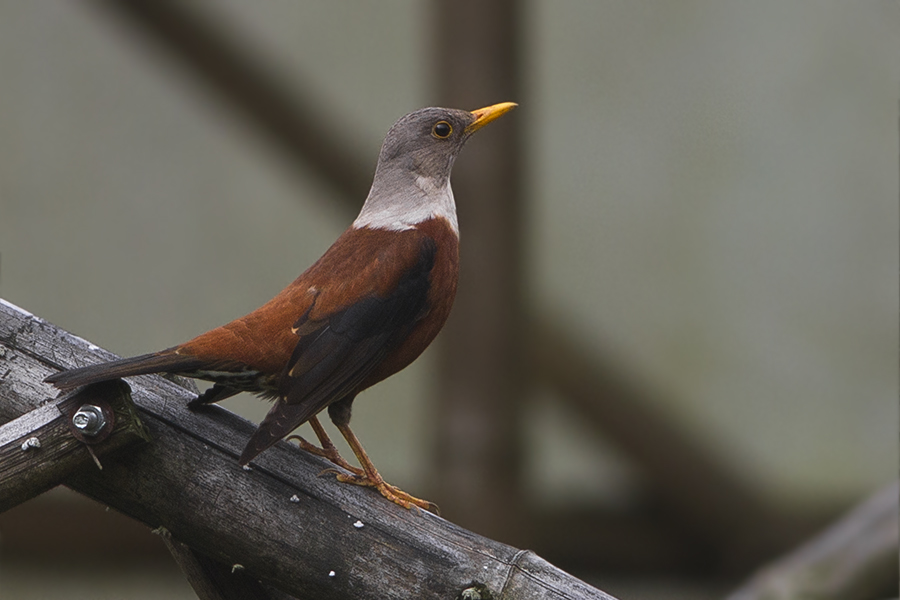
Chestnut thrush

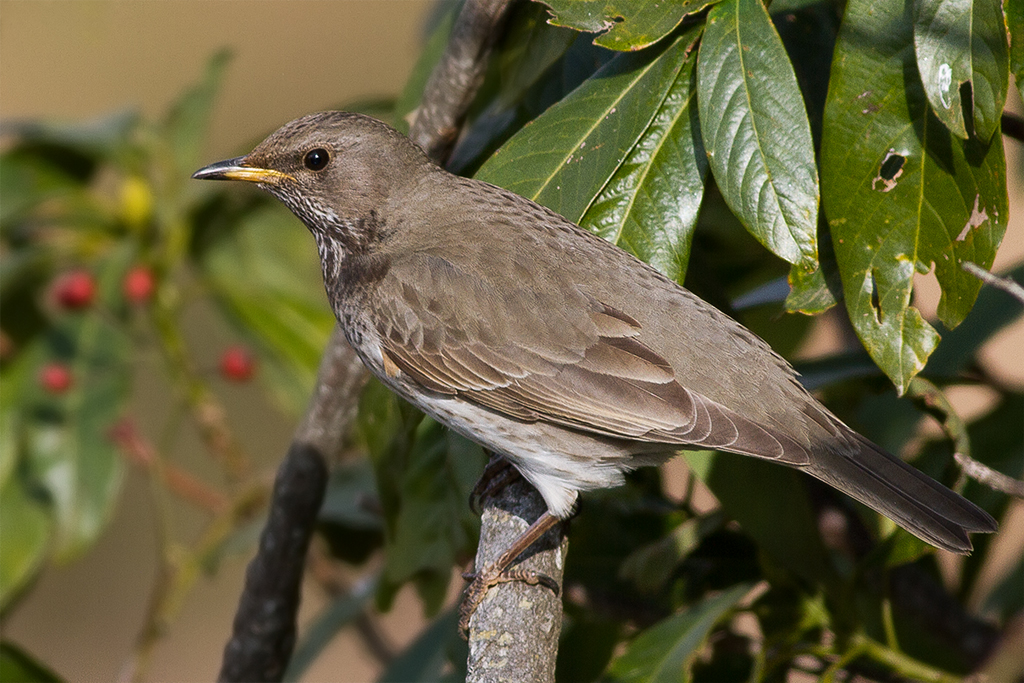
Black-throated thrush

Order: Passeriformes Family: Turdidae

The thrushes are a group of passerine birds that occur mainly in the Old World. They are plump, soft plumaged, small to medium-sized insectivores or sometimes omnivores, often feeding on the ground. Many have attractive songs.

Common name	Binomial	Comments
Pied thrush	Geokichla wardii	
Orange-headed thrush	Geokichla citrina	
Siberian thrush	Geokichla sibirica	
Alpine thrush	Zoothera mollissima	
Himalayan thrush	Zoothera salimalii	
Long-tailed thrush	Zoothera dixoni	
Scaly thrush	Zoothera dauma	
White's thrush	Zoothera aurea	(V)
Nilgiri thrush	Zoothera neilgherriensis	(E)
Long-billed thrush	Zoothera monticola	
Dark-sided thrush	Zoothera marginata	
Grandala	Grandala coelicolor	
Tickell's thrush	Turdus unicolor	
Black-breasted thrush	Turdus dissimilis	
Japanese thrush	Turdus cardis	(V)
White-collared blackbird	Turdus albocinctus	
Grey-winged blackbird	Turdus boulboul	
Tibetan blackbird	Turdus maximus	
Indian blackbird	Turdus simillimus	
Chinese blackbird	Turdus mandarinus	(V)
Chestnut thrush	Turdus rubrocanus	
White-backed thrush	Turdus kessleri	(V)
Grey-sided thrush	Turdus feae	
Eyebrowed thrush	Turdus obscurus	
Japanese thrush	Turdus cardis	(V)
Black-throated thrush	Turdus atrogularis	
Red-throated thrush	Turdus ruficollis	
Naumann's thrush	Turdus naumanni	(V)
Dusky thrush	Turdus eunomus	
Fieldfare	Turdus pilaris	(V)
Song thrush	Turdus philomelos	(V)
Chinese thrush	Turdus mupinensis	(V)
Mistle thrush	Turdus viscivorus	
Purple cochoa	Cochoa purpurea	
Green cochoa	Cochoa viridis	

== Chats and Old World flycatchers ==
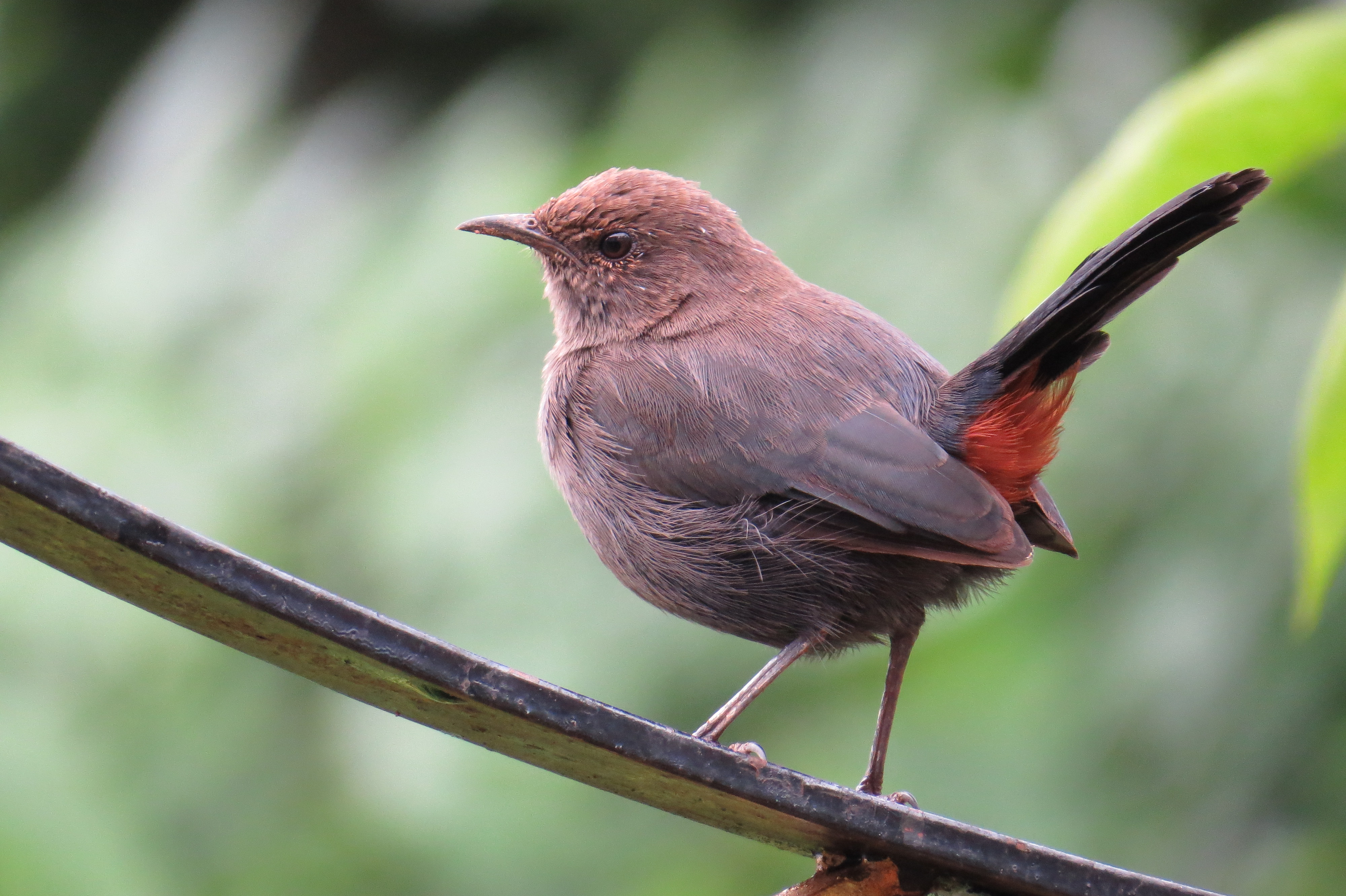
Indian robin

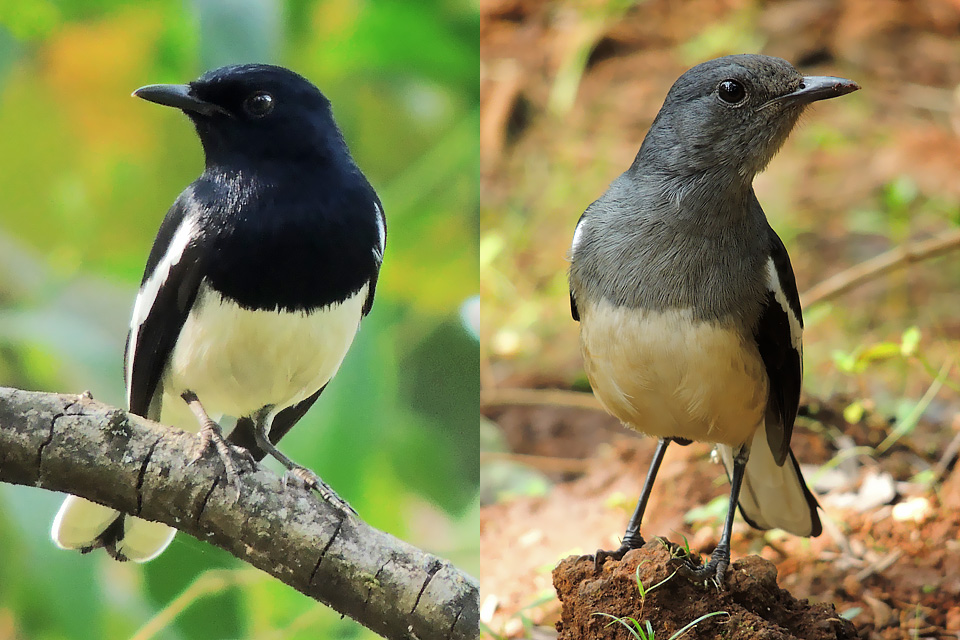
Oriental magpie robin, male on the left and female

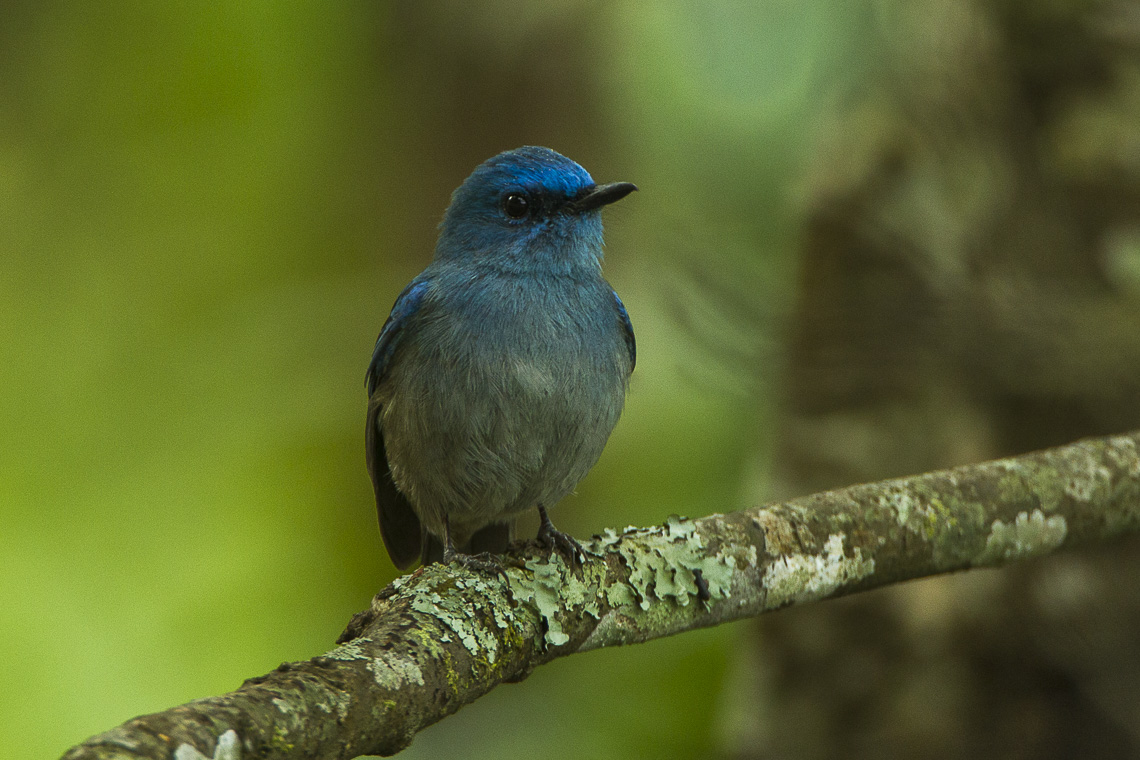
Pale blue flycatcher

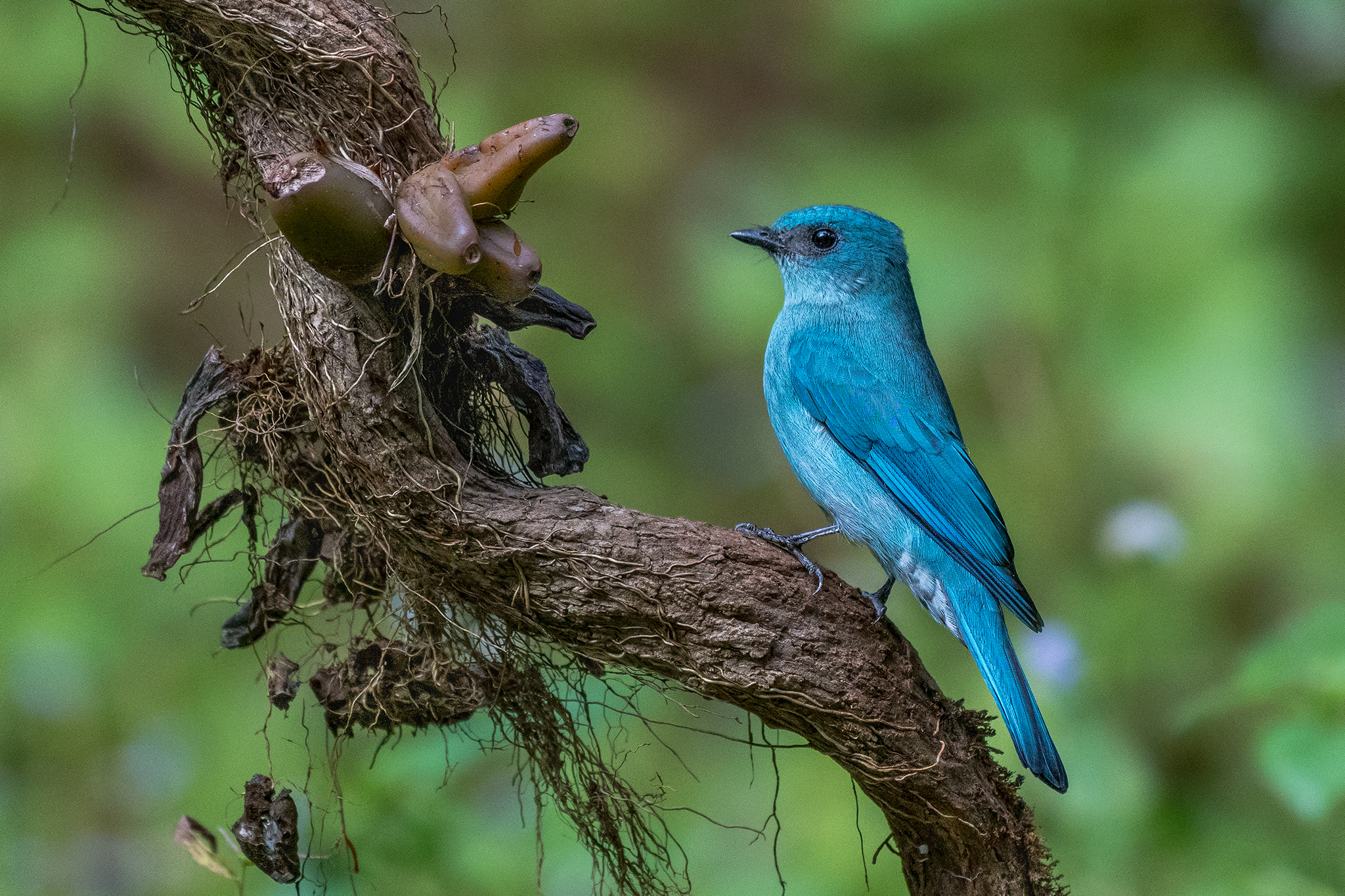
Verditer flycatcher

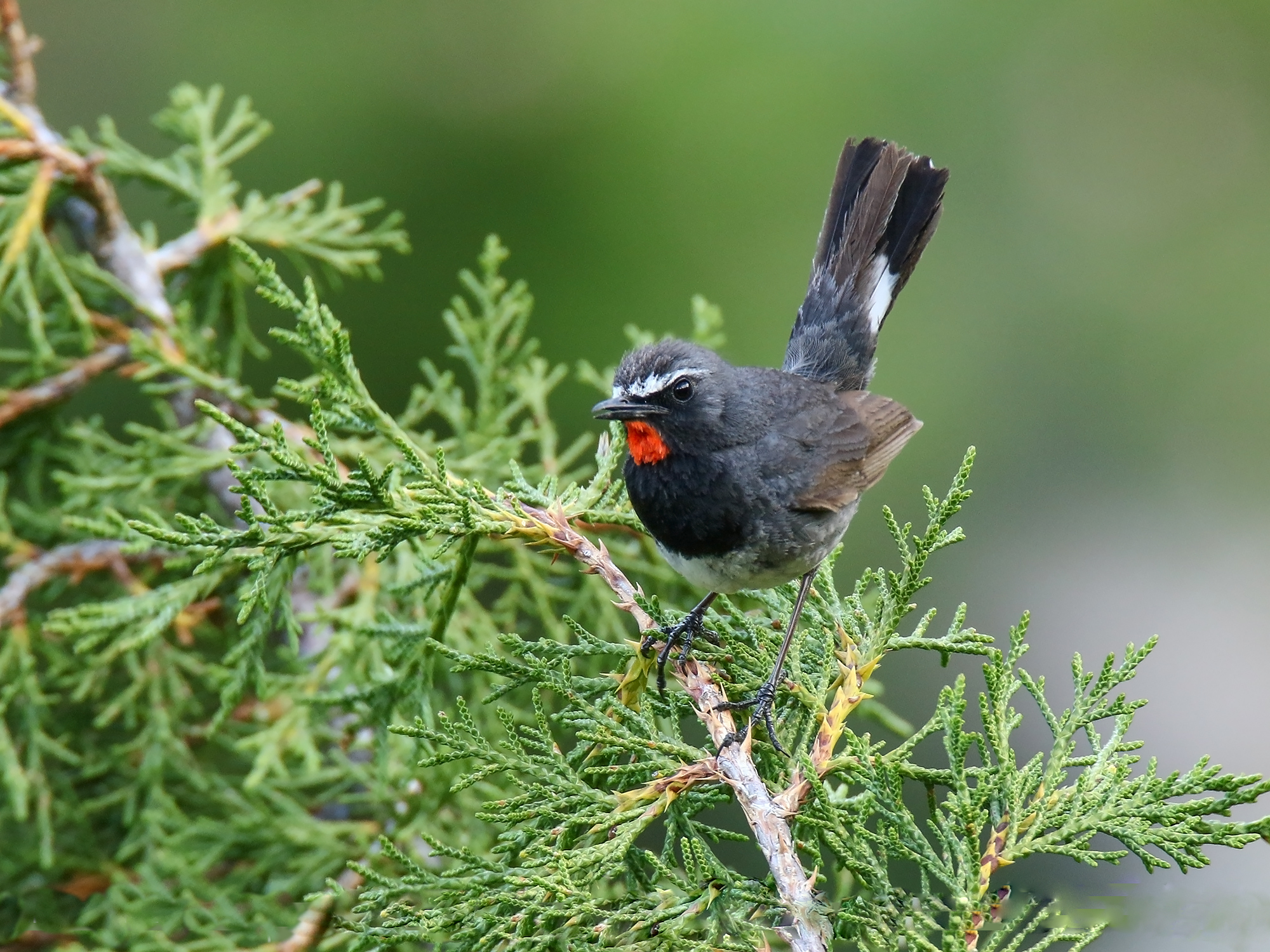
Himalayan rubythroat

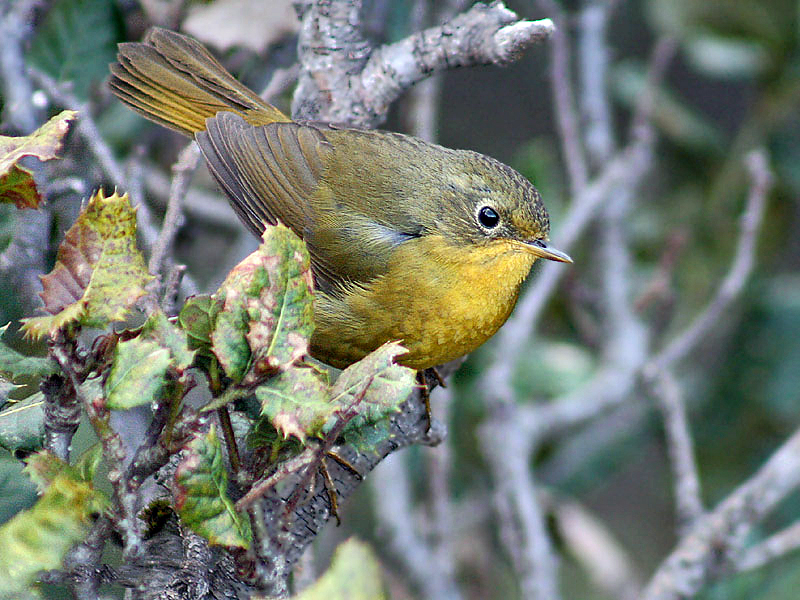
Golden bush robin

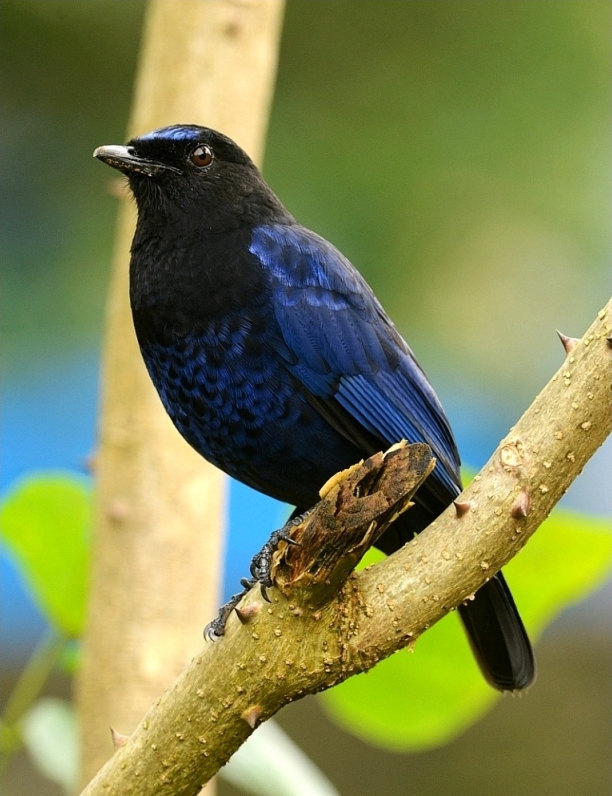
Malabar whistling thrush

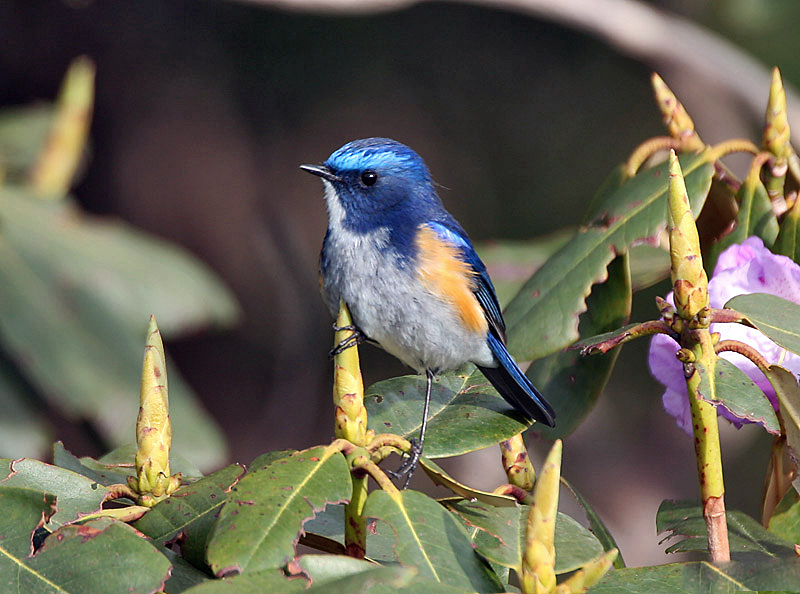
Red-flanked bluetail

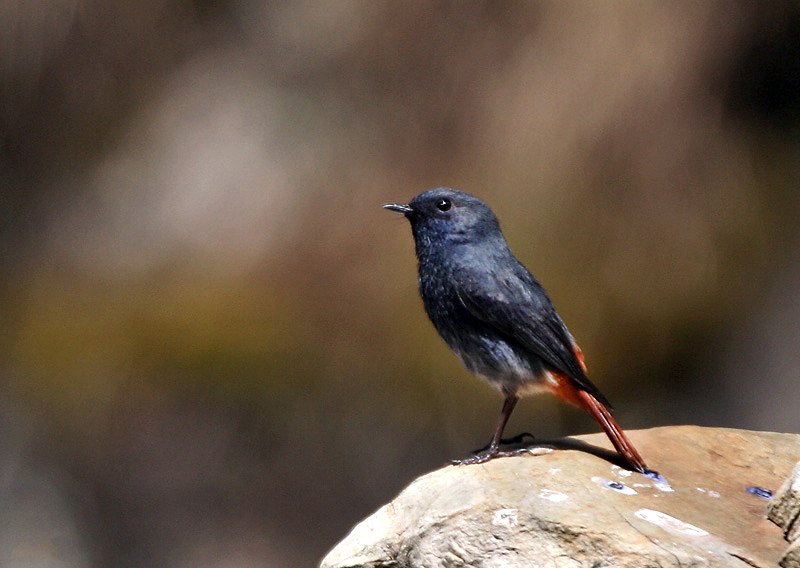
Plumbeous water redstart

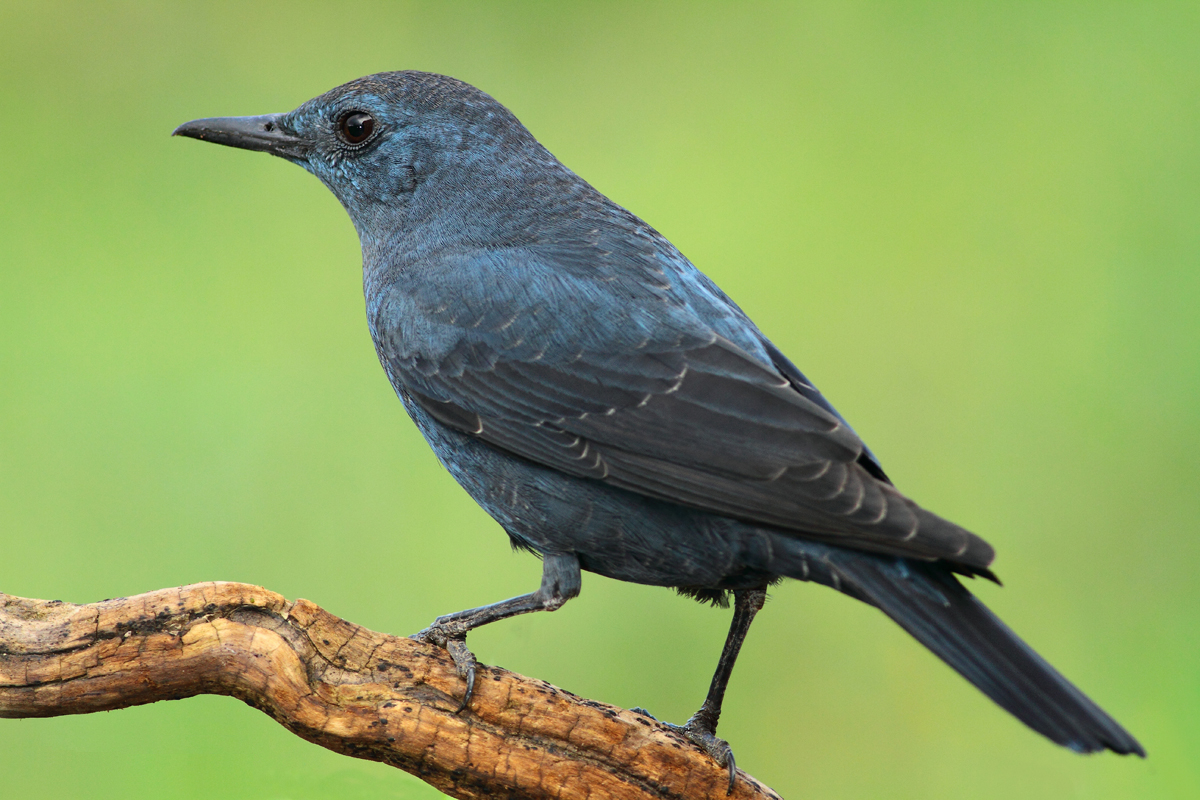
Blue rock thrush

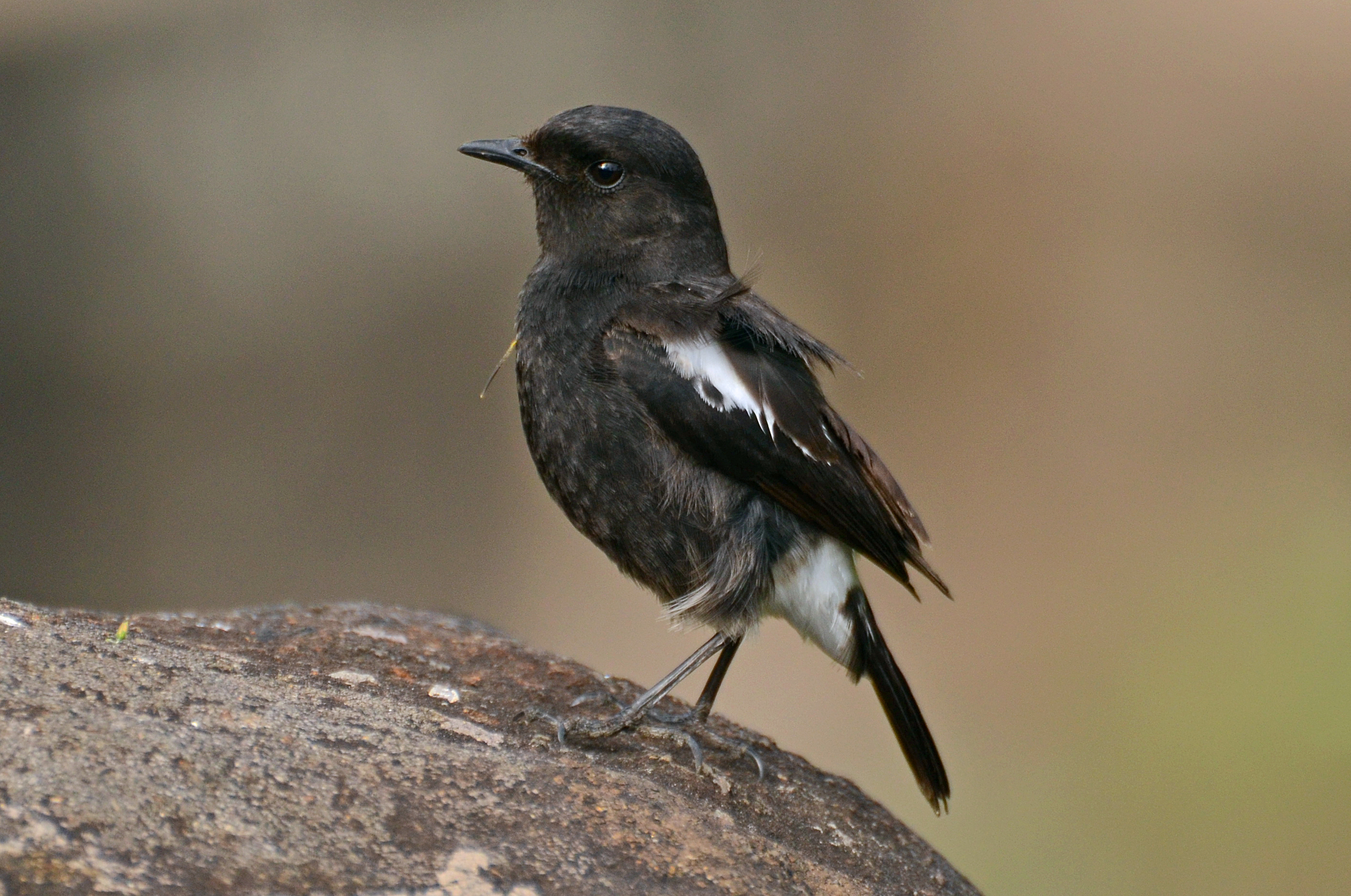
Pied bush chat

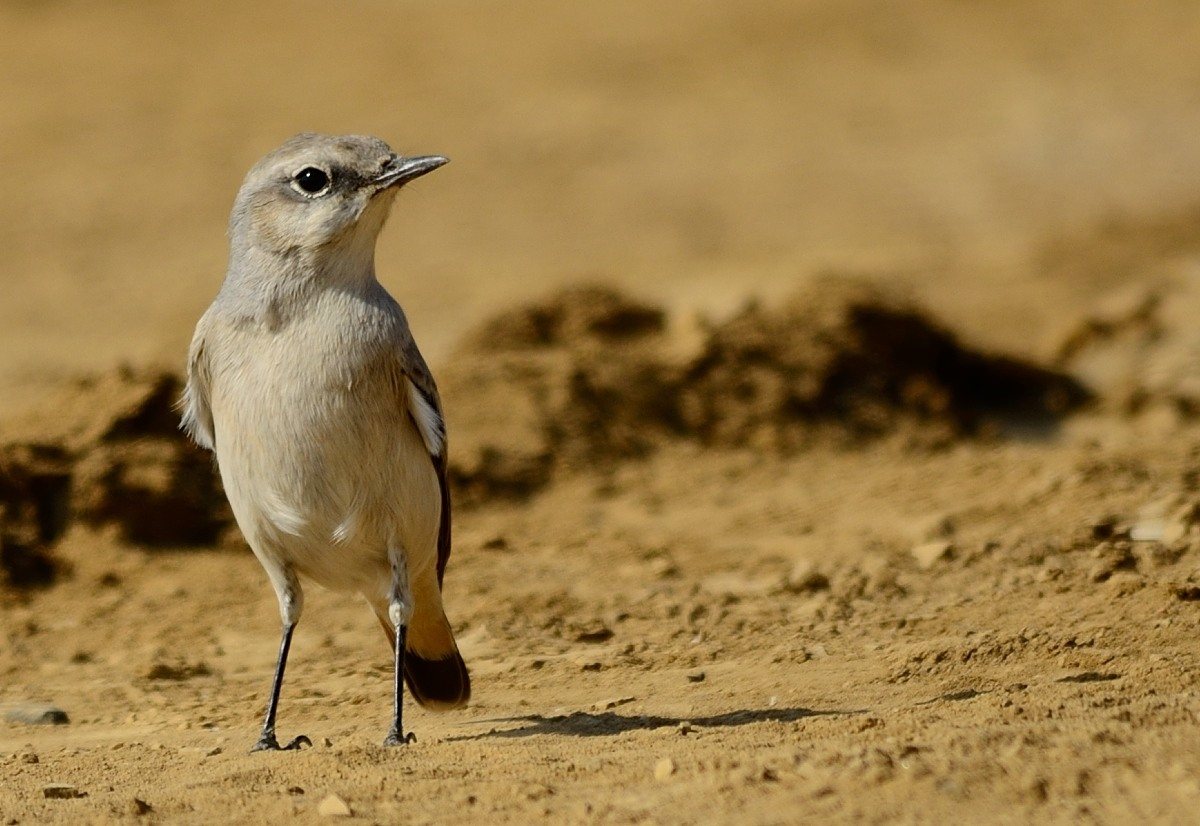
Red-tailed wheatear

Order: Passeriformes Family: Muscicapidae

Old World flycatchers are a large group of small passerine birds native to the Old World. They are mainly small arboreal insectivores. The appearance of these birds is highly varied; some have weak songs and harsh calls, but others have among the most famous of all songbird songs.

Common name	Binomial	Comments
Rufous-tailed scrub robin	Cercotrichas galactotes	
Indian robin	Copsychus fulicatus	
Oriental magpie-robin	Copsychus saularis	
White-rumped shama	Copsychus malabaricus	
Andaman shama	Copsychus albiventris	(E)
Spotted flycatcher	Muscicapa striata	
Dark-sided flycatcher	Muscicapa sibirica	
Asian brown flycatcher	Muscicapa dauurica	
Brown-breasted flycatcher	Muscicapa muttui	
Grey-streaked flycatcher	Muscicapa griseisticta	(V)
Ferruginous flycatcher	Muscicapa ferruginea	
White-gorgeted flycatcher	Anthipes monileger	
Pale blue flycatcher	Cyornis unicolor	
White-bellied blue flycatcher	Cyornis pallidipes	(E)
Pale-chinned blue flycatcher	Cyornis poliogenys	
Hill blue flycatcher	Cyornis whitei	Split from C. banyumas
Large blue flycatcher	Cyornis magnirostris	Near threatened
Tickell's blue flycatcher	Cyornis tickelliae	
Blue-throated blue flycatcher	Cyornis rubeculoides	
White-tailed flycatcher	Cyornis concretus	
Nicobar jungle flycatcher	Cyornis nicobaricus	(E); near threatened
Rufous-bellied niltava	Niltava sundara	
Chinese vivid niltava	Niltava oatesi	
Large niltava	Niltava grandis	
Small niltava	Niltava macgrigoriae	
Blue-and-white flycatcher	Cyanoptila cyanomelana	(V)
Zappey's flycatcher	Cyanoptila cumatilis	(V); near threatened
Verditer flycatcher	Eumyias thalassinus	
Nilgiri flycatcher	Eumyias albicaudatus	(E)
Gould's shortwing	Heteroxenicus stellatus	
Rusty-bellied shortwing	Brachypteryx hyperythra	
Lesser shortwing	Brachypteryx leucophris	
Himalayan shortwing	Brachypteryx cruralis	
Indian blue robin	Larvivora brunnea	
Siberian blue robin	Larvivora cyane	(V)
Bluethroat	Luscinia svecica	
White-bellied redstart	Luscinia phaenicuroides	
Himalayan rubythroat	Calliope pectoralis	
Chinese rubythroat	Calliope tschebaiewi	
Siberian rubythroat	Calliope calliope	
Firethroat	Calliope pectardens	(V); near threatened
White-tailed robin	Myiomela leucura	
Nilgiri blue robin	Sholicola major	(E); near threatened
White-bellied blue robin	Sholicola albiventris	(E); near threatened
White-browed bush robin	Tarsiger indicus	
Rufous-breasted bush robin	Tarsiger hyperythrus	
Red-flanked bluetail	Tarsiger cyanurus	(V)
Himalayan bluetail	Tarsiger rufilatus	
Golden bush robin	Tarsiger chrysaeus	
Little forktail	Enicurus scouleri	
Black-backed forktail	Enicurus immaculatus	
Slaty-backed forktail	Enicurus schistaceus	
White-crowned forktail	Enicurus leschenaulti	
Spotted forktail	Enicurus maculatus	
Malabar whistling thrush	Myophonus horsfieldii	(E)
Blue whistling thrush	Myophonus caeruleus	
Blue-fronted robin	Cinclidium frontale	
Yellow-rumped flycatcher	Ficedula zanthopygia	(V)
Slaty-backed flycatcher	Ficedula erithacus	
Mugimaki flycatcher	Ficedula mugimaki	(V)
Pygmy flycatcher	Ficedula hodgsoni	
Rufous-gorgeted flycatcher	Ficedula strophiata	
Sapphire flycatcher	Ficedula sapphira	
Ultramarine flycatcher	Ficedula superciliaris	
Little pied flycatcher	Ficedula westermanni	
Slaty-blue flycatcher	Ficedula tricolor	
Snowy-browed flycatcher	Ficedula hyperythra	
Rusty-tailed flycatcher	Ficedula ruficauda	
Taiga flycatcher	Ficedula albicilla	
Red-breasted flycatcher	Ficedula parva	
Kashmir flycatcher	Ficedula subrubra	Vulnerable
Black-and-orange flycatcher	Ficedula nigrorufa	(E)
Eversmann's redstart	Phoenicurus erythronotus	
Blue-capped redstart	Phoenicurus coeruleocephala	
Black redstart	Phoenicurus ochruros	
Common redstart	Phoenicurus phoenicurus	(V)
Hodgson's redstart	Phoenicurus hodgsoni	
White-throated redstart	Phoenicurus schisticeps	
Daurian redstart	Phoenicurus auroreus	
Güldenstädt's redstart	Phoenicurus erythrogastrus	
Blue-fronted redstart	Phoenicurus frontalis	
Plumbeous water redstart	Phoenicurus fuliginosus	
White-capped redstart	Phoenicurus leucocephalus	
White-throated rock thrush	Monticola gularis	
Common rock thrush	Monticola saxatilis	
Blue rock thrush	Monticola solitarius	
Chestnut-bellied rock thrush	Monticola rufiventris	
Blue-capped rock thrush	Monticola cinclorhyncha	
Whinchat	Saxicola rubetra	(V)
White-browed bush chat	Saxicola macrorhynchus	Vulnerable
White-throated bush chat	Saxicola insignis	
Siberian stonechat	Saxicola maurus	
Amur stonechat	Saxicola stejnegeri	
White-tailed stonechat	Saxicola leucurus	
Pied bush chat	Saxicola caprata	
Jerdon's bush chat	Saxicola jerdoni	
Grey bush chat	Saxicola ferreus	
Northern wheatear	Oenanthe oenanthe	(V)
Isabelline wheatear	Oenanthe isabellina	
Desert wheatear	Oenanthe deserti	
Pied wheatear	Oenanthe pleschanka	
Brown rock chat	Oenanthe fusca	
Variable wheatear	Oenanthe picata	
Hume's wheatear	Oenanthe albonigra	
Finsch's wheatear	Oenanthe finschii	(V)
Red-tailed wheatear	Oenanthe chrysopygia	

== Dippers ==
Order: Passeriformes Family: Cinclidae

Dippers are a group of perching birds whose habitat includes aquatic environments in the Americas, Europe and Asia. They are named for their bobbing or dipping movements. Two species have been recorded in India.

Common name	Binomial	Comments
White-throated dipper	Cinclus cinclus	
Brown dipper	Cinclus pallasii	

== Leafbirds ==
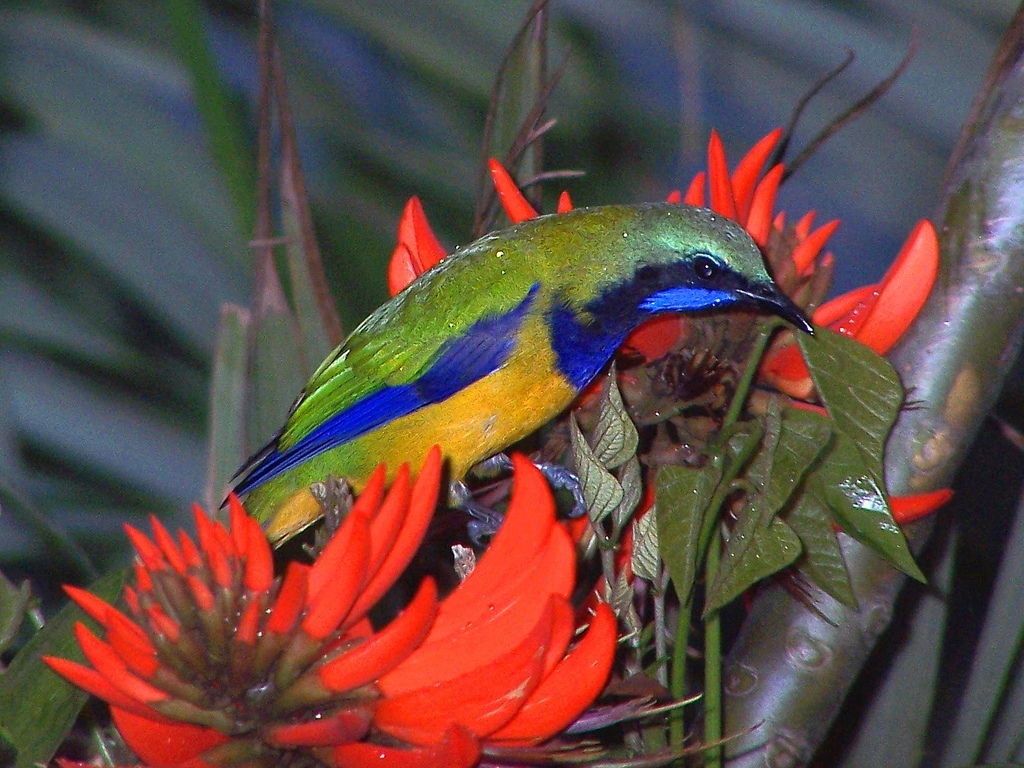
Orange-bellied leafbird

Order: Passeriformes Family: Chloropseidae

The leafbirds are small, bulbul-like birds. The males are brightly plumaged, usually in greens and yellows.

Common name	Binomial	Comments
Blue-winged leafbird	Chloropsis cochinchinensis	
Jerdon's leafbird	Chloropsis jerdoni	
Golden-fronted leafbird	Chloropsis aurifrons	
Orange-bellied leafbird	Chloropsis hardwickii	

== Flowerpeckers ==
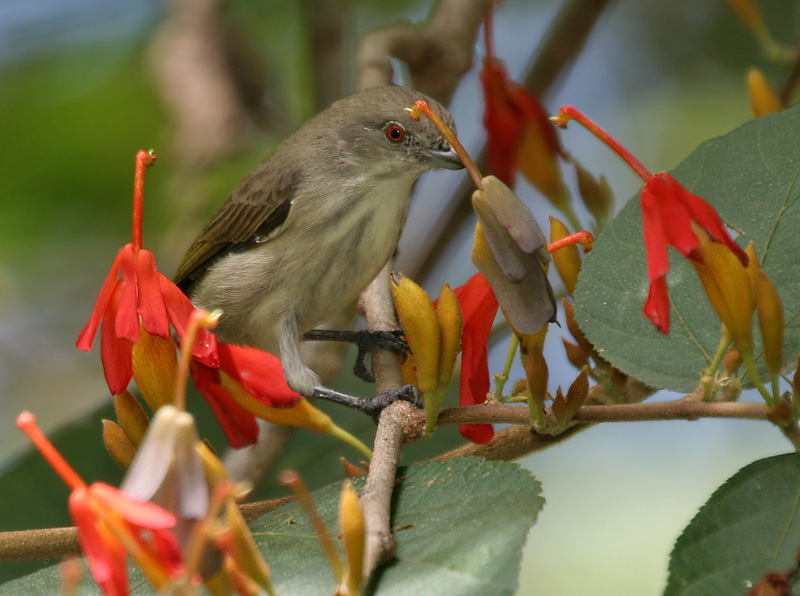
Thick-billed flowerpecker

Order: Passeriformes Family: Dicaeidae

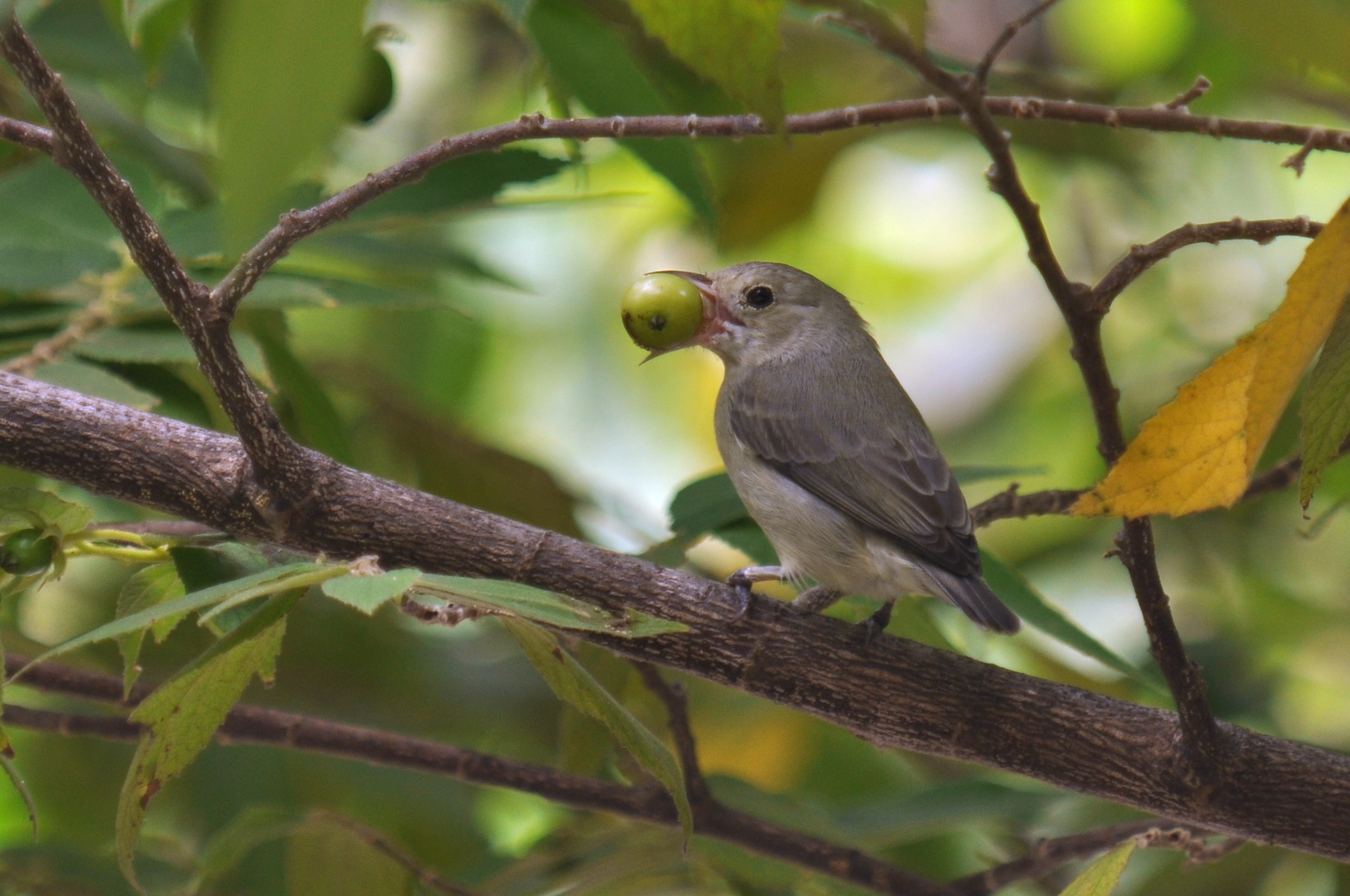
Pale-billed flowerpecker

The flowerpeckers are very small, stout, often brightly coloured birds, with short tails, short thick curved bills and tubular tongues.

Common name	Binomial	Comments
Thick-billed flowerpecker	Dicaeum agile	
Yellow-vented flowerpecker	Dicaeum chrysorrheum	
Yellow-bellied flowerpecker	Dicaeum melanozanthum	
Pale-billed flowerpecker	Dicaeum erythrorhynchos	
Nilgiri flowerpecker	Dicaeum concolor	
Plain flowerpecker	Dicaeum minullum	
Andaman flowerpecker	Dicaeum virescens	(E)
Fire-breasted flowerpecker	Dicaeum ignipectus	
Scarlet-backed flowerpecker	Dicaeum cruentatum	

== Sunbirds ==
Order: Passeriformes Family: Nectariniidae

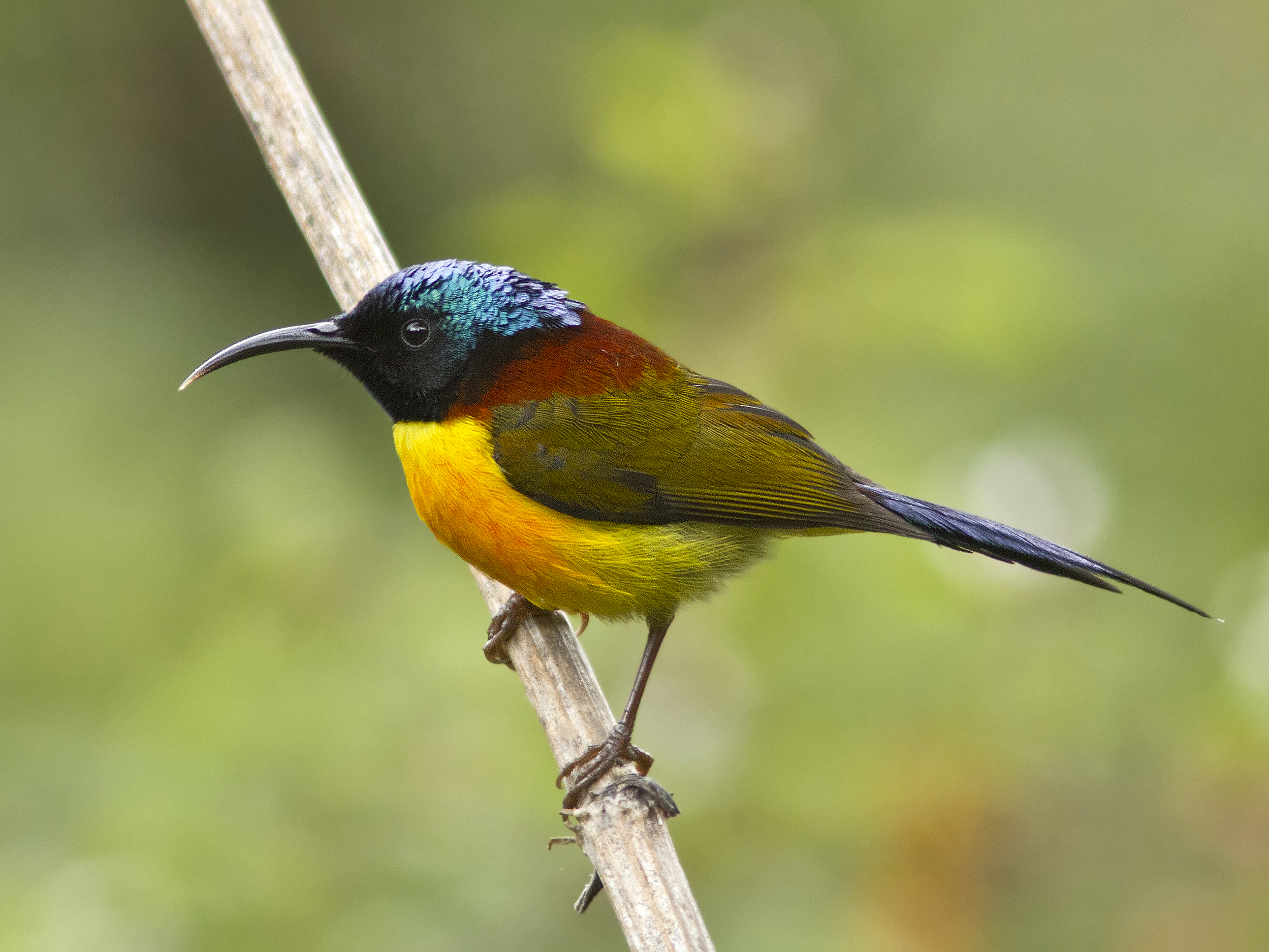
Green-tailed sunbird

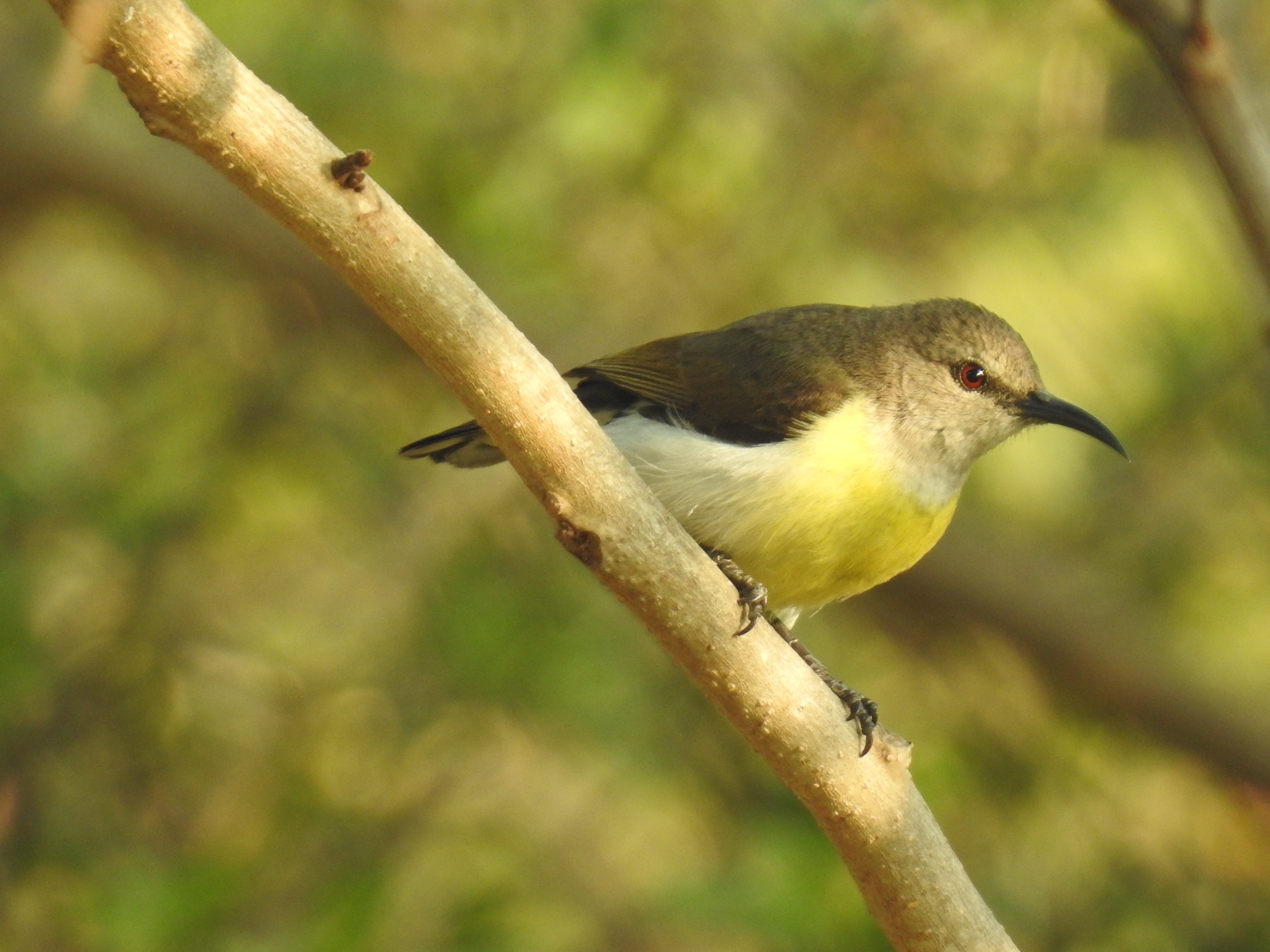
Purple-rumped sunbird

The sunbirds and spiderhunters are very small passerine birds which feed largely on nectar, although they will also take insects, especially when feeding young. Flight is fast and direct on their short wings. Most species can take nectar by hovering like a hummingbird, but usually perch to feed.

Common name	Binomial	Comments
Ruby-cheeked sunbird	Chalcoparia singalensis	
Purple-rumped sunbird	Leptocoma zeylonica	
Crimson-backed sunbird	Leptocoma minima	(E)
Van Hasselt's sunbird	Leptocoma brasiliana	
Purple sunbird	Cinnyris asiaticus	
Ornate sunbird	Cinnyris ornatus	
Loten's sunbird	Cinnyris lotenius	
Mrs. Gould's sunbird	Aethopyga gouldiae	
Green-tailed sunbird	Aethopyga nipalensis	
Black-throated sunbird	Aethopyga saturata	
Crimson sunbird	Aethopyga siparaja	
Vigors's sunbird	Aethopyga vigorsii	(E)
Fire-tailed sunbird	Aethopyga ignicauda	
Little spiderhunter	Arachnothera longirostra	
Streaked spiderhunter	Arachnothera magna	

== Old World sparrows and snowfinches ==
Order: Passeriformes Family: Passeridae

Sparrows are small passerine birds. In general, sparrows tend to be small, plump, brown or grey birds with short tails and short powerful beaks. Sparrows are seed eaters, but they also consume small insects.

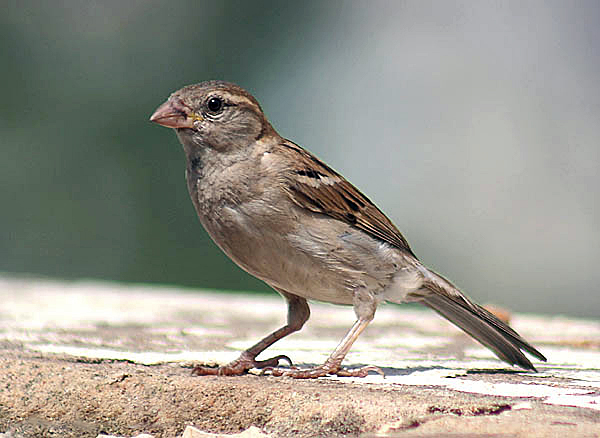
House sparrow

Common name	Binomial	Comments
House sparrow	Passer domesticus	
Spanish sparrow	Passer hispaniolensis	
Sind sparrow	Passer pyrrhonotus	
Russet sparrow	Passer cinnamomeus	
Eurasian tree sparrow	Passer montanus	
Pale rockfinch	Carpospiza brachydactyla	(V)
Rock sparrow	Petronia petronia	
Yellow-throated sparrow	Gymnoris xanthocollis	
Black-winged snowfinch	Montifringilla adamsi	
White-rumped snowfinch	Onychostruthus taczanowskii	(V)
Rufous-necked snowfinch	Pyrgilauda ruficollis	
Blanford's snowfinch	Pyrgilauda blanfordi	

== Weavers and widowbirds ==
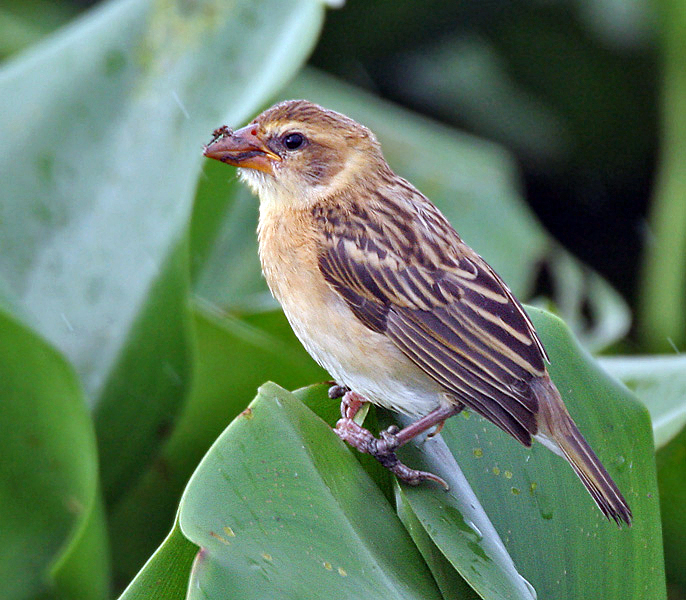
Baya weaver

Order: Passeriformes Family: Ploceidae

The weavers are small passerine birds related to sparrows and finches. They are seed-eating birds with rounded conical bills. The males of many species are brightly coloured, usually in red or yellow and black, some species show variation in colour only in the breeding season. There are four species which have been recorded in India.

Common name	Binomial	Comments
Black-breasted weaver	Ploceus benghalensis	
Streaked weaver	Ploceus manyar	
Baya weaver	Ploceus philippinus	
Finn's weaver	Ploceus megarhynchus	Endangered

== Waxbills, munias, and allies ==
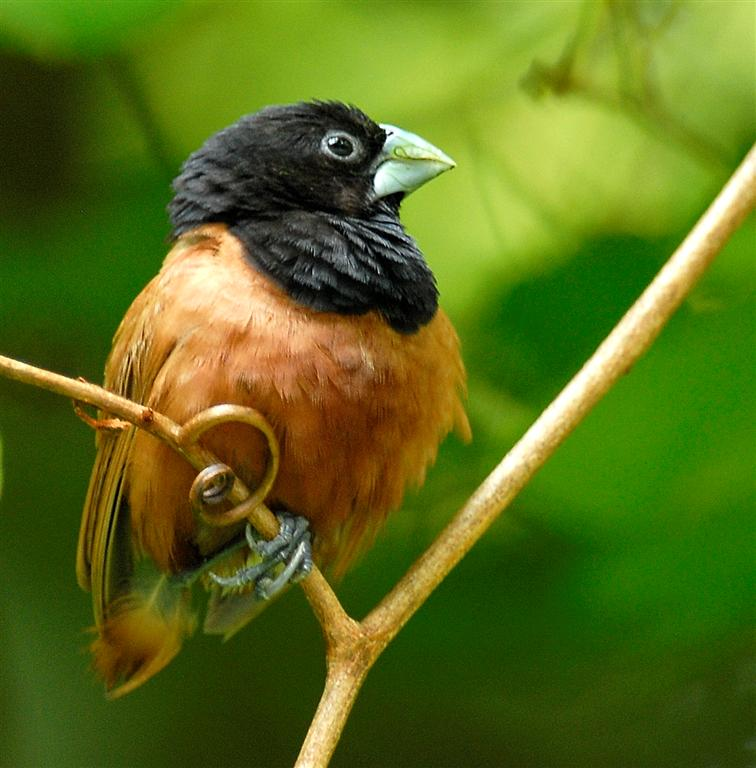
Chestnut munia

Order: Passeriformes Family: Estrildidae

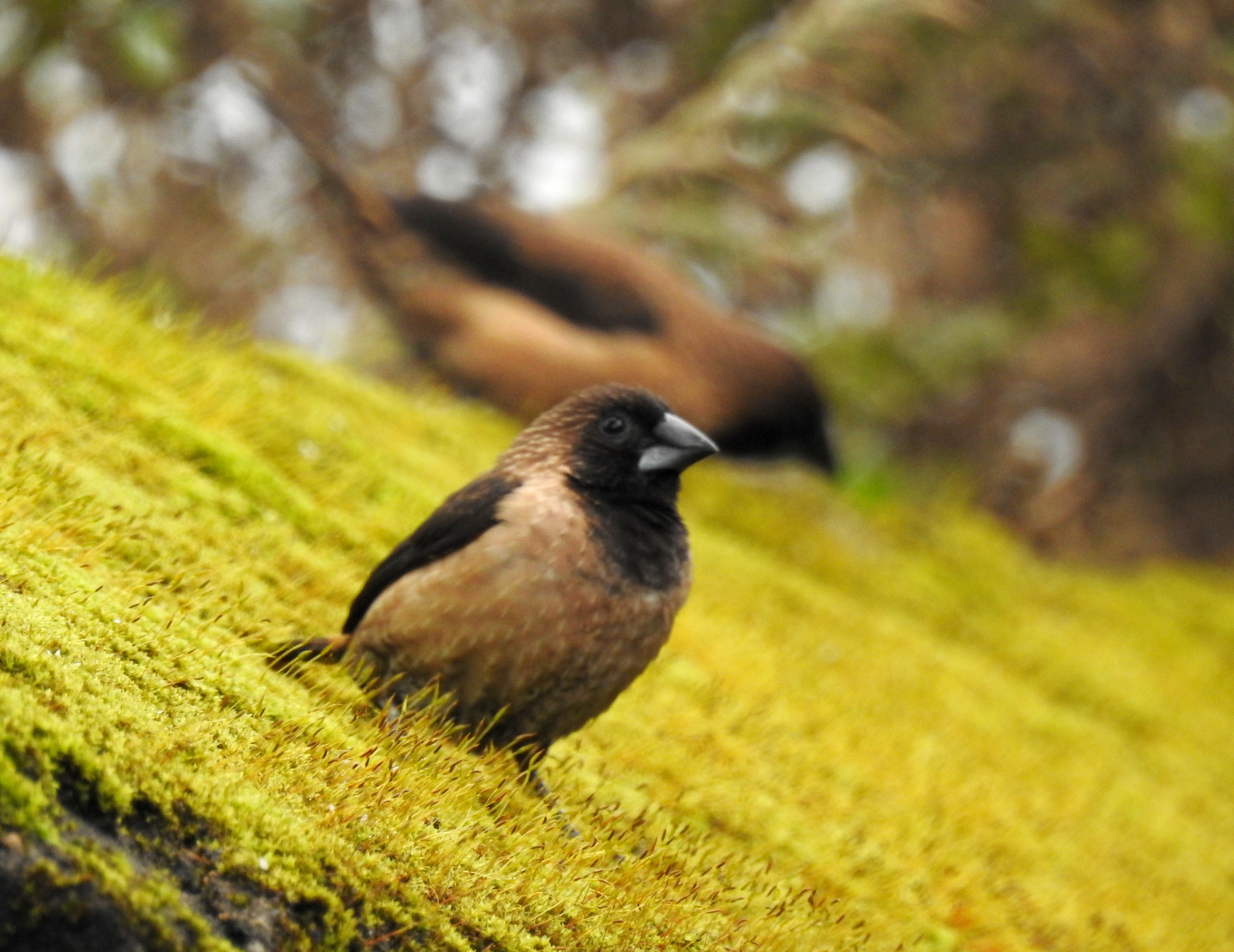
Black-throated munia

The munias and allies are small passerine birds of the Old World tropics and Australasia. They are gregarious and often colonial seed eaters with short thick but pointed bills. They are all similar in structure and habits, but have wide variation in plumage colours and patterns.

Common name	Binomial	Comments
Indian silverbill	Euodice malabarica	
Scaly-breasted munia	Lonchura punctulata	
Black-throated munia	Lonchura kelaarti	
White-rumped munia	Lonchura striata	
Tricoloured munia	Lonchura malacca	
Chestnut munia	Lonchura atricapilla	
Green avadavat	Amandava formosa	(E); vulnerable
Red avadavat	Amandava amandava	

== Accentors ==
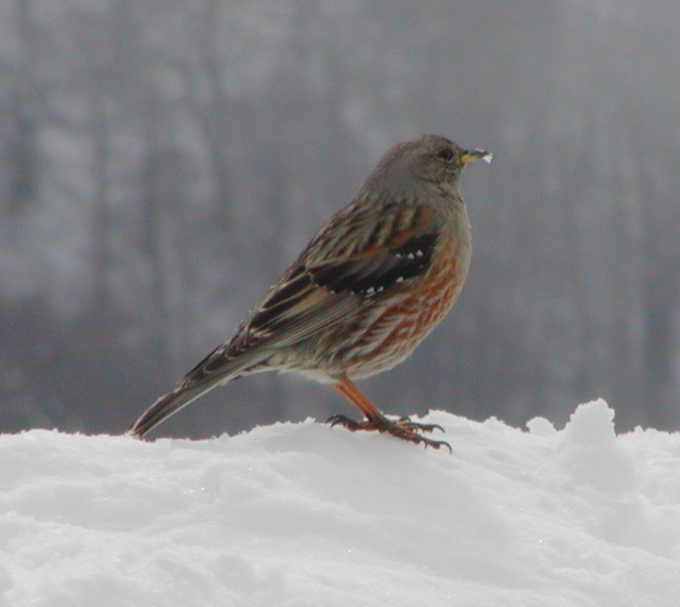
Alpine accentor

Order: Passeriformes Family: Prunellidae

The accentors are in the only bird family, Prunellidae, which is completely endemic to the Palearctic. They are small, fairly drab species superficially similar to sparrows. There are seven species which have been recorded in India.

Common name	Binomial	Comments
Alpine accentor	Prunella collaris	
Altai accentor	Prunella himalayana	
Robin accentor	Prunella rubeculoides	
Rufous-breasted accentor	Prunella strophiata	
Brown accentor	Prunella fulvescens	
Black-throated accentor	Prunella atrogularis	
Maroon-backed accentor	Prunella immaculata	

== Wagtails and pipits ==
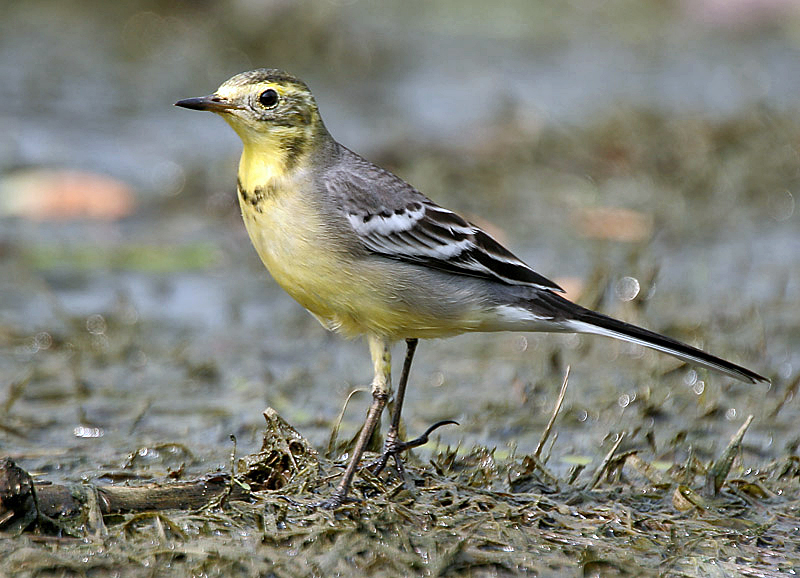
Citrine wagtail

Order: Passeriformes Family: Motacillidae

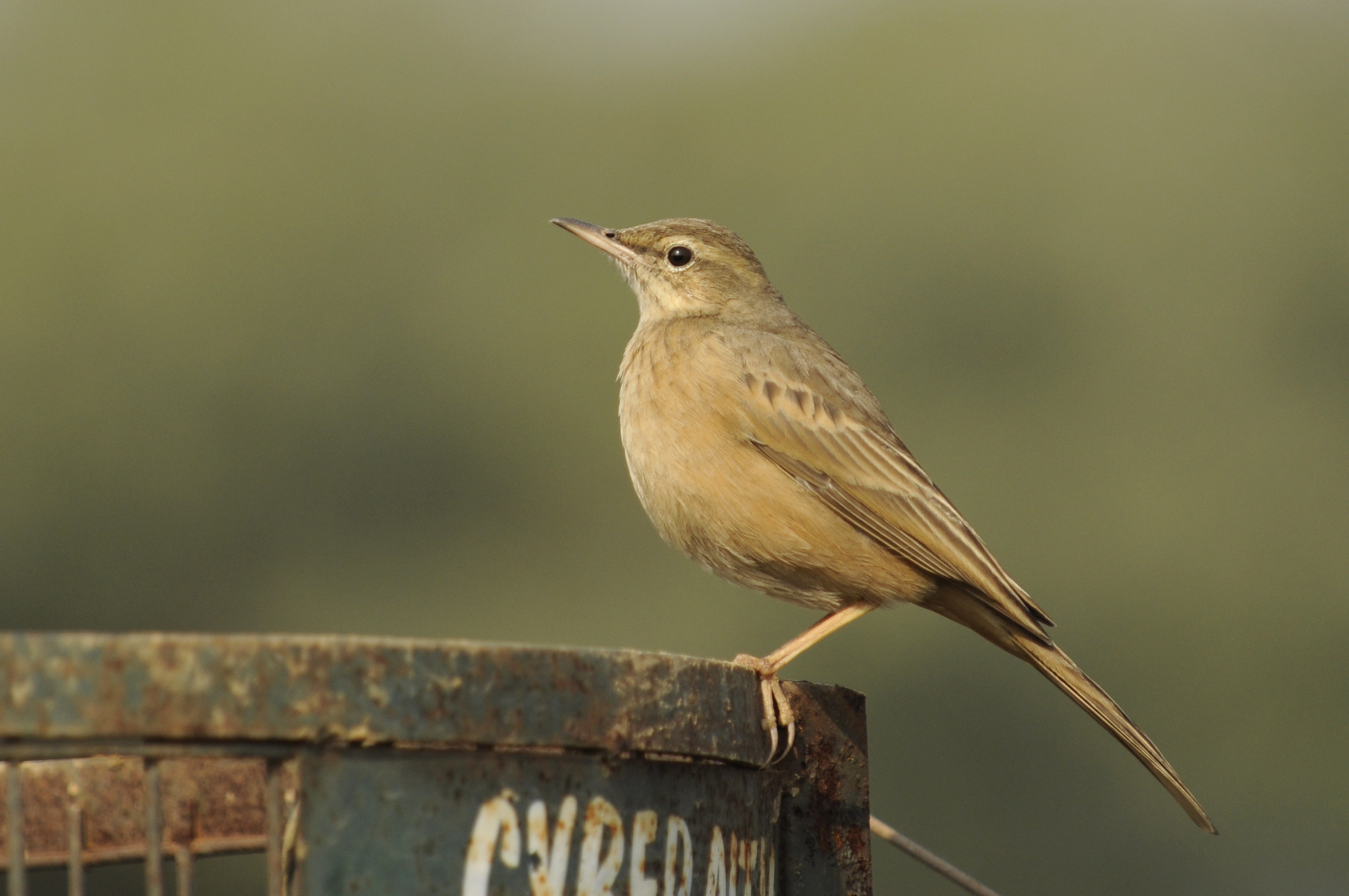
Long-billed pipit

Motacillidae is a family of small passerine birds with medium to long tails. They include the wagtails, longclaws and pipits. They are slender, ground feeding insectivores of open country. There are 21 species which have been recorded in India.

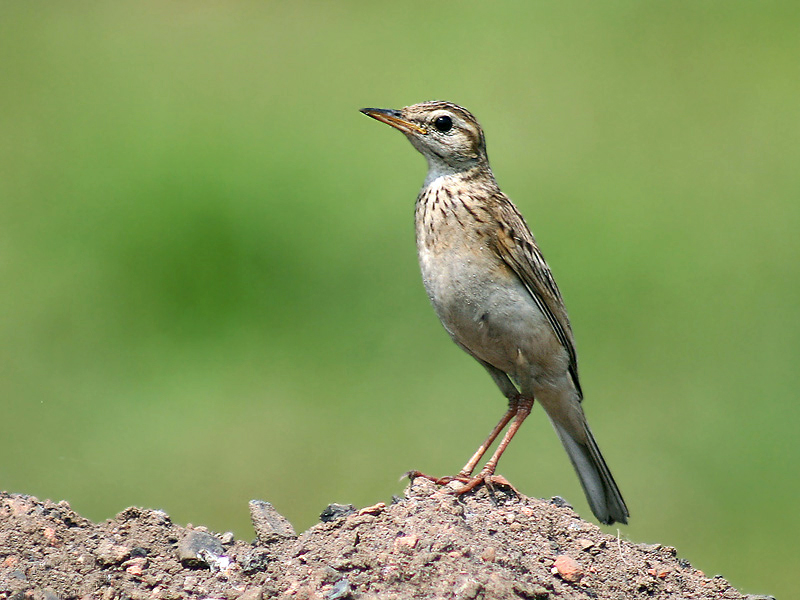
Oriental pipit

Common name	Binomial	Comments
Forest wagtail	Dendronanthus indicus	
Western yellow wagtail	Motacilla flava	
Eastern yellow wagtail	Motacilla tschutschensis	(V)
Citrine wagtail	Motacilla citreola	
Grey wagtail	Motacilla cinerea	
White wagtail	Motacilla alba	
White-browed wagtail	Motacilla maderaspatensis	
Richard's pipit	Anthus richardi	
Paddyfield pipit	Anthus rufulus	
Blyth's pipit	Anthus godlewskii	
Tawny pipit	Anthus campestris	
Long-billed pipit	Anthus similis	
Tree pipit	Anthus trivialis	
Olive-backed pipit	Anthus hodgsoni	
Rosy pipit	Anthus roseatus	
Red-throated pipit	Anthus cervinus	
Siberian pipit	Anthus japonicus	(V)
Water pipit	Anthus spinoletta	
Nilgiri pipit	Anthus nilghiriensis	(E); vulnerable
Upland pipit	Anthus sylvanus	
Meadow pipit	Anthus pratensis	(V)

== Finches and euphonias ==
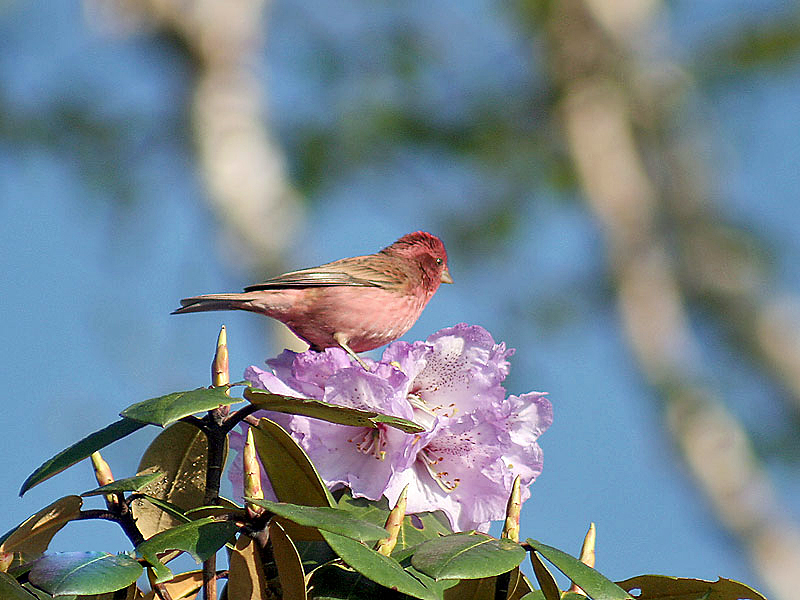
Pink-browed rosefinch

Order: Passeriformes Family: Fringillidae

Finches are seed-eating passerine birds, that are small to moderately large and have a strong beak, usually conical and in some species very large. All have twelve tail feathers and nine primaries. These birds have a bouncing flight with alternating bouts of flapping and gliding on closed wings, and most sing well. There are 44 species which have been recorded in India.

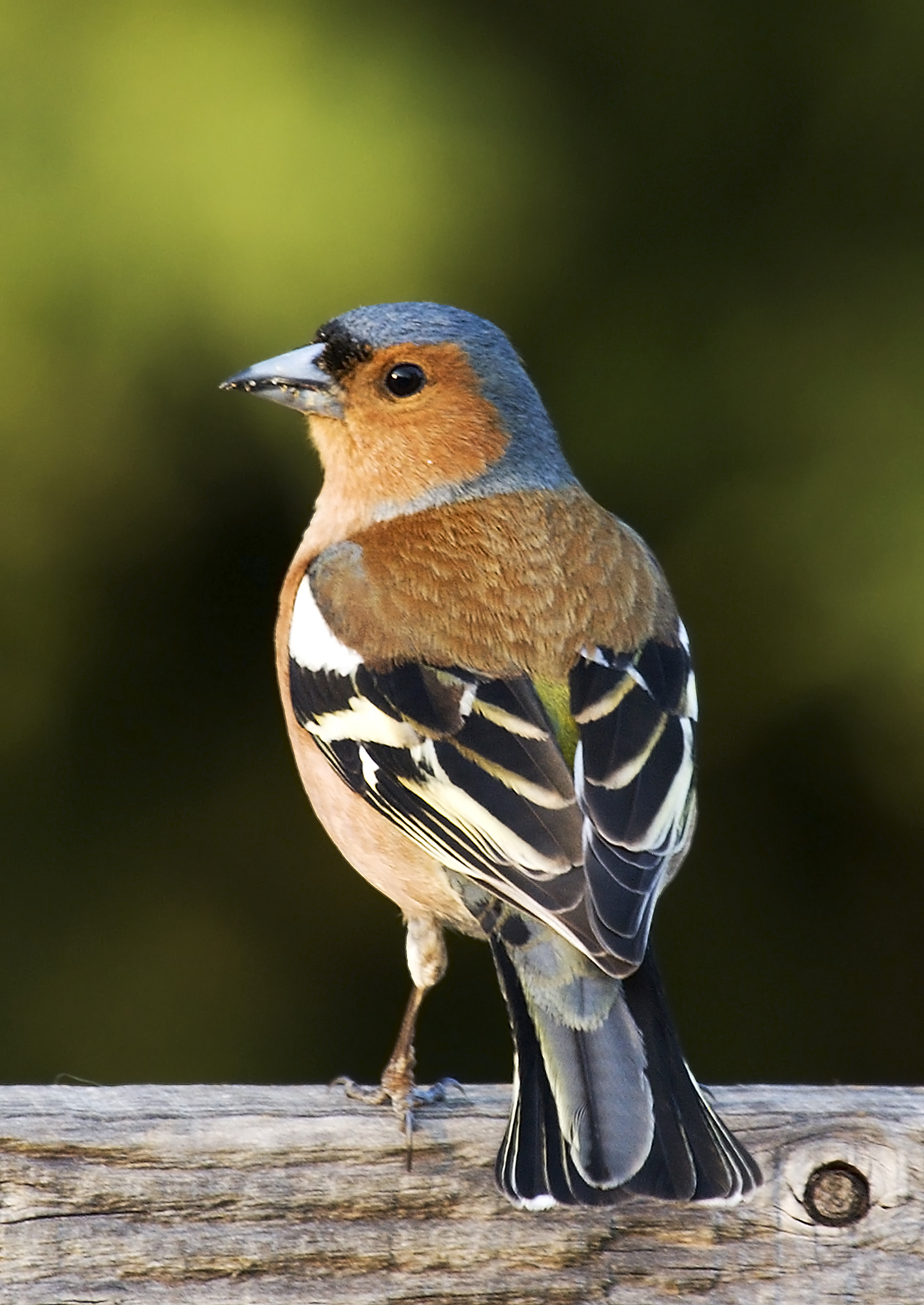
Chaffinch

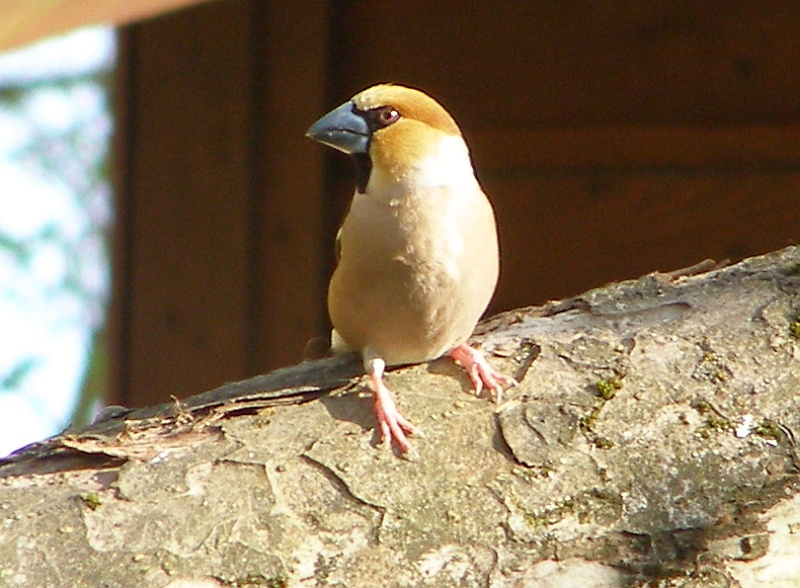
Hawfinch

Common name	Binomial	Comments
Eurasian chaffinch	Fringilla coelebs	
Brambling	Fringilla montifringilla	
Black-and-yellow grosbeak	Mycerobas icterioides	
Collared grosbeak	Mycerobas affinis	
Spot-winged grosbeak	Mycerobas melanozanthos	
White-winged grosbeak	Mycerobas carnipes	
Hawfinch	Coccothraustes coccothraustes	
Chinese grosbeak	Eophona migratoria	
Brown bullfinch	Pyrrhula nipalensis	
Orange bullfinch	Pyrrhula aurantiaca	
Red-headed bullfinch	Pyrrhula erythrocephala	
Grey-headed bullfinch	Pyrrhula erythaca	
Asian crimson-winged finch	Rhodopechys sanguineus	(V)
Trumpeter finch	Bucanetes githagineus	
Mongolian finch	Bucanetes mongolicus	
Blanford's rosefinch	Agraphospiza rubescens	
Spectacled finch	Callacanthis burtoni	
Golden-naped finch	Pyrrhoplectes epauletta	
Dark-breasted rosefinch	Procarduelis nipalensis	
Plain mountain finch	Leucosticte nemoricola	
Brandt's mountain finch	Leucosticte brandti	
Common rosefinch	Carpodacus erythrinus	
Scarlet finch	Carpodacus sipahi	
Streaked rosefinch	Carpodacus rubicilloides	
Great rosefinch	Carpodacus rubicilla	
Blyth's rosefinch	Carpodacus grandis	
Himalayan beautiful rosefinch	Carpodacus pulcherrimus	
Pink-rumped rosefinch	Carpodacus waltoni	(V)
Pink-browed rosefinch	Carpodacus rodochroa	
Dark-rumped rosefinch	Carpodacus edwardsii	
Spot-winged rosefinch	Carpodacus rodopeplus	
Vinaceous rosefinch	Carpodacus vinaceus	
Pale rosefinch	Carpodacus stoliczkae	(V)
Sillem's rosefinch	Carpodacus sillemi	Data deficient
Himalayan white-browed rosefinch	Carpodacus thura	
Chinese white-browed rosefinch	Carpodacus dubius	(V)
Red-fronted rosefinch	Carpodacus puniceus	
Crimson-browed finch	Carpodacus subhimachalus	
Three-banded rosefinch	Carpodacus trifasciatus	
Yellow-breasted greenfinch	Chloris spinoides	
European greenfinch	Chloris chloris	
Black-headed greenfinch	Chloris ambigua	
Desert finch	Rhodospiza obsoleta	(V)
Twite	Linaria flavirostris	
Common linnet	Linaria cannabina	
Red crossbill	Loxia curvirostra	
Grey-crowned goldfinch	Carduelis caniceps	
Red-fronted serin	Serinus pusillus	
Tibetan serin	Spinus thibetanus	
Eurasian siskin	Spinus spinus	(V)

== Longspurs ==
Order: Passeriformes Family: Calcariidae

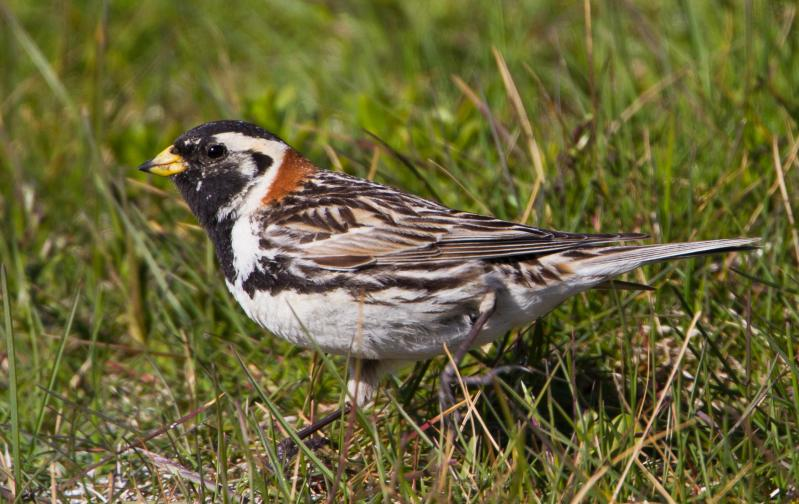
Lapland longspur

The longspurs are a small family of passerines with six species of bird. They are similar to buntings, and were formerly included in that family.

Common name	Binomial	Comments
Lapland longspur	Calcarius lapponicus	(V)

== Buntings ==
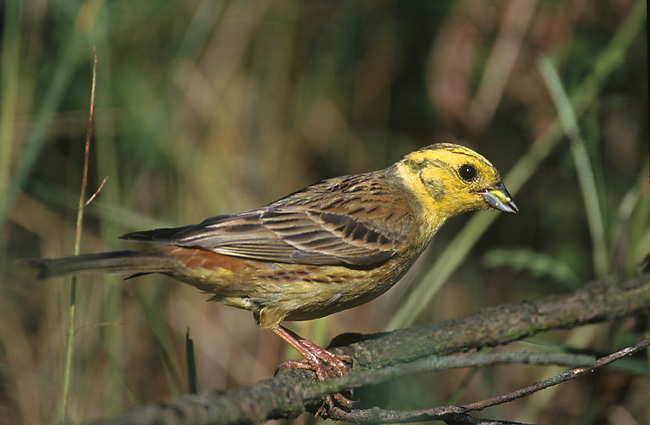
Yellowhammer

Order: Passeriformes Family: Emberizidae

The buntings are a large family of passerine birds. They are seed-eating birds with distinctively shaped bills. Many buntings have distinctive head patterns.

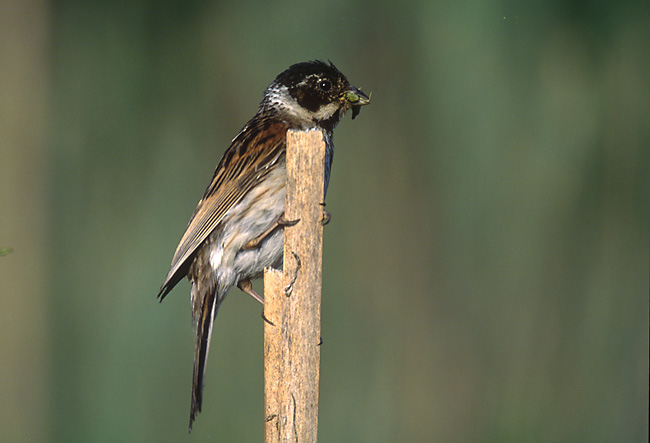
Reed bunting

Common name	Binomial	Comments
Crested bunting	Emberiza lathami	
Yellowhammer	Emberiza citrinella	(V)
Pine bunting	Emberiza leucocephalos	
Rock bunting	Emberiza cia	
Godlewski's bunting	Emberiza godlewskii	
Meadow bunting	Emberiza cioides	(V)
White-capped bunting	Emberiza stewarti	
Grey-necked bunting	Emberiza buchanani	
Ortolan bunting	Emberiza hortulana	(V)
Striolated bunting	Emberiza striolata	
Tristram's bunting	Emberiza tristrami	(V)
Chestnut-eared bunting	Emberiza fucata	
Little bunting	Emberiza pusilla	
Yellow-browed bunting	Emberiza chrysophrys	(V)
Rustic bunting	Emberiza rustica	(V); vulnerable
Yellow-breasted bunting	Emberiza aureola	Critically endangered
Chestnut bunting	Emberiza rutila	
Black-headed bunting	Emberiza melanocephala	
Red-headed bunting	Emberiza bruniceps	
Black-faced bunting	Emberiza spodocephala	
Common reed bunting	Emberiza schoeniclus	

== See also ==
- List of Indian state birds
- Birds of the Central Indian Highlands
- Lists of birds by region

== Other sources ==
- Rasmussen, Pamela C.; Anderton, J. C. (2005). Birds of South Asia: The Ripley Guide. Smithsonian Institution & Lynx Edicions. ISBN 978-84-87334-67-2.
- Clements, James F. (2000). Birds of the World: A Checklist. Cornell University Press. p. 880. ISBN 978-0-934797-16-0.
