= Meitei festivals =

Cultural heritage of the Meitei people

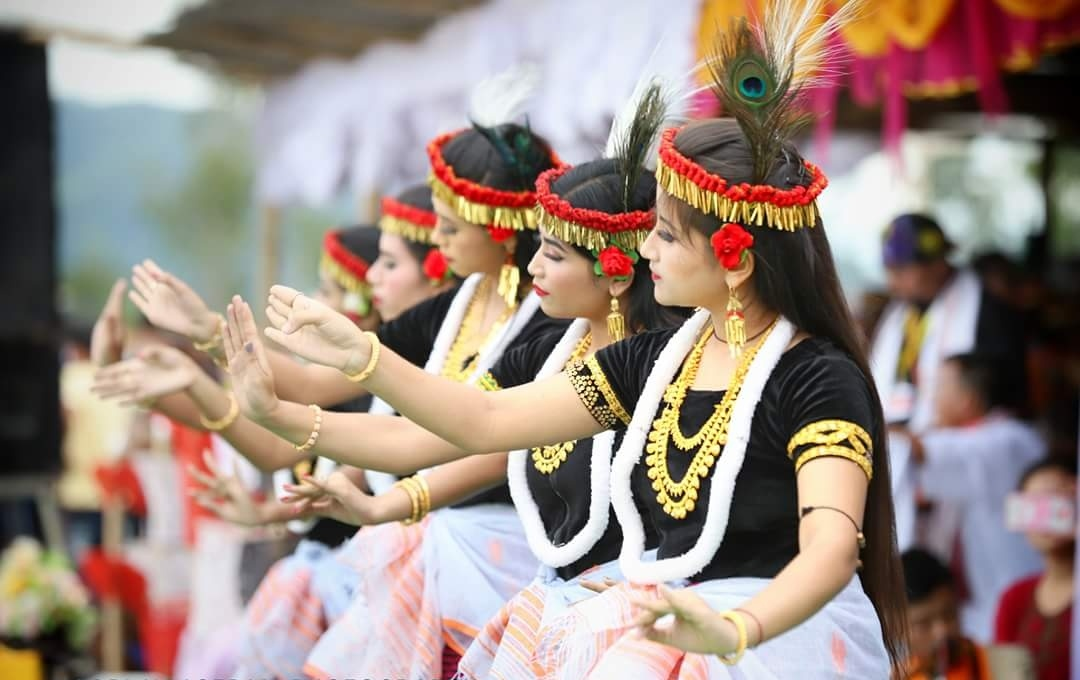
Meitei women performing ceremonial dance

Meitei festivals are an integral part of the cultural heritage of the Meitei civilisation, native to the Indian state of Manipur, and surrounding areas, including Assam, Tripura, Myanmar's Meitei diasporic settlements and Bangladeshi Meitei settlements. The festivals often celebrate events from Ancient Manipur and often coinciding with seasonal changes, in adherence to the Meitei calendar. These festivals are celebrated throughout the year, each with its own significance and rituals.

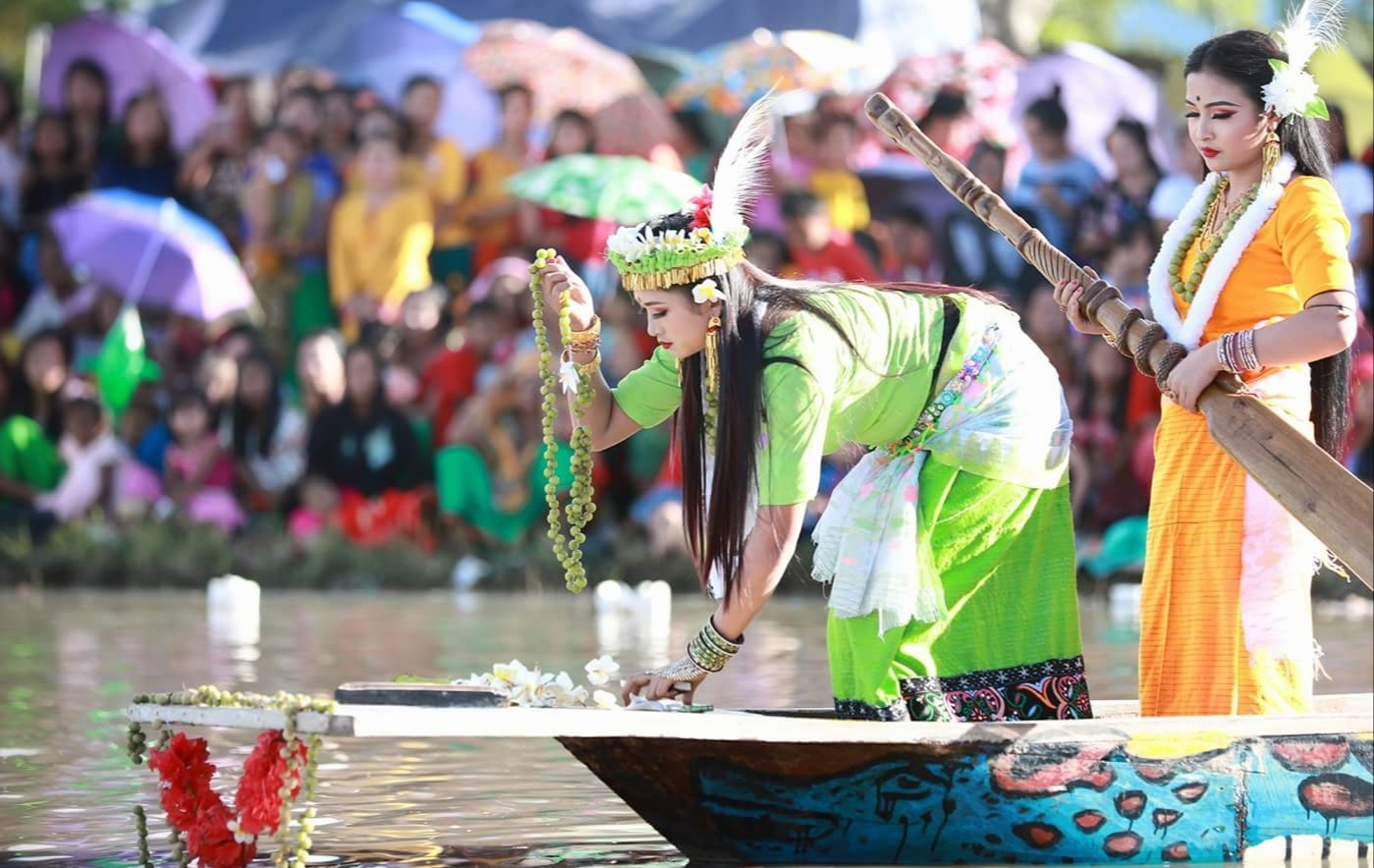
A Meitei woman holding a garland of gooseberries to participate in the Heikru Hidongba.

== List ==
=== Cheiraoba ===
Cheiraoba (ꯆꯩꯔꯥꯎꯕ), also known as Sajibu Nongma Panba Cheiraoba, or Sajibu Cheiraoba, the traditional Meitei lunar new year, falls on the 1st lunar day of Sajibu month in the Meitei calendar. During the celebration, people worship guardian deity, Lainingthou Sanamahi inside the domestic sacred altar called Sanamahi Kachin, by offering seasonal fruits and vegetables.

=== Emoinu Eratpa ===
Emoinu Eratpa (ꯏꯃꯣꯢꯅꯨ ꯏꯔꯥꯠꯄ), also spelled as Imoinu Iratpa, is the sacred day for Emoinu, the goddess of wealth and prosperity in Meitei mythology and religion. It falls on the 12th lunar day of the Waakching month of the Meitei calendar.

=== Heikru Hidongba ===
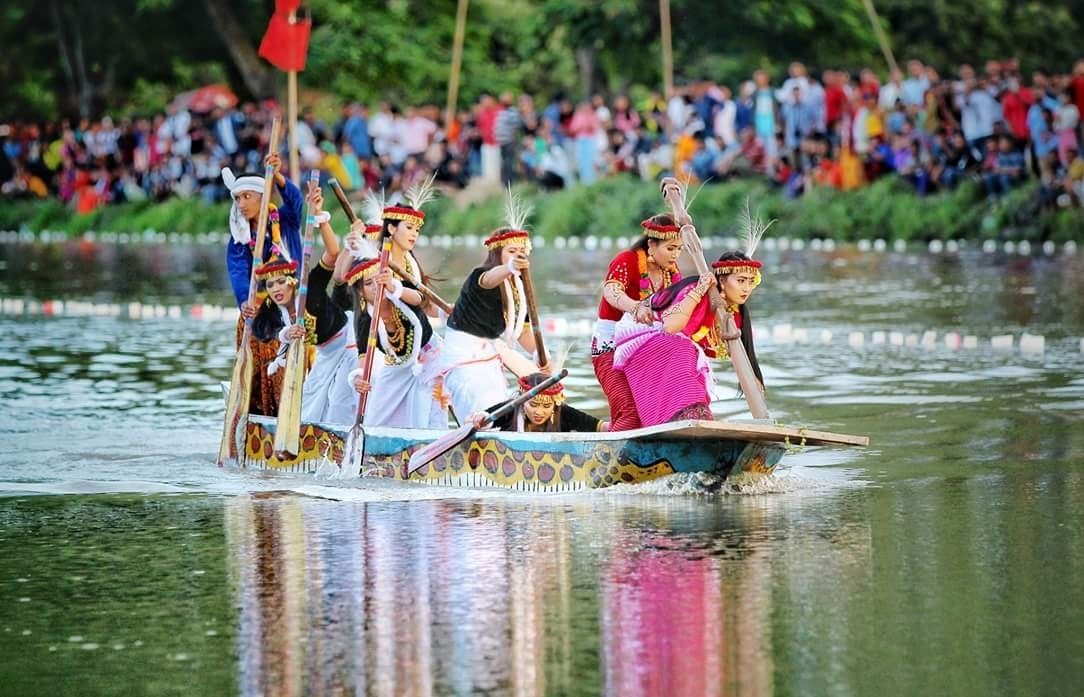
Heikru Hidongba.

Heikru Hidongba (ꯍꯩꯀ꯭ꯔꯨ ꯍꯤꯗꯣꯡꯕ), the annual royal boat racing festive event (a variation of Hiyang Tannaba), is organised on the 11th lunar day of the Langban month of the Meitei calendar. The event is mainly organized in the moat of the Sagolband Bijoy Gobinda in Imphal.

It is a socio-religious ceremony performed with elements of religious, custom and other traditional belief of creation.

=== Kwaak Taanba ===
Kwaak Taanba (ꯀ꯭ꯋꯥꯛ ꯇꯥꯟꯕ), the ceremonial freeing of the crow by the Meitei king, is celebrated on the 10th lunar day of the Mera month of the Meitei calendar. Its main place of celebration is the Sana Konung, the Royal Residence of the King of Manipur.

The day falls on the 10th lunar day of Mera month of the Meitei calendar. The festival includes numerous rites and rituals, along with various divine dance and music performances held at the Sana Konung.

The setting free of the crow is performed at the Thangapat, the Royal Moat, in Imphal. The main theme of the festival is to bring prosperity and good luck in the region.

=== Lai Haraoba ===
Lai Haraoba (ꯂꯥꯢ ꯍꯔꯥꯎꯕ), the merrymaking festival dedicated to the group of tutelary deities called Umang Lais of Sanamahism, has no fixed strict dates of celebration according to Meitei calendar. Some are celebrated for a few weeks while some continue for more than a month. Individual temple authorities keep the timing varying for the respective deities.

In Classical Meitei language, Lai Haraoba means merry making of the Gods.

This festival is organized with themes focusing on the creation myth of Sanamahism.

=== Mera Chaorel Houba ===
Mera Chaorel Houba (ꯃꯦꯔꯥ ꯆꯥꯎꯔꯦꯜ ꯍꯧꯕ) is the onset of the Mera month of Meitei calendar. It is marked by the gatherings of the Meitei people and the hill people (tribesmen communities) of Manipur. It is celebrated on the 1st lunar day of the Mera month of the Meitei calendar. Devotees offer rice, fruits and vegetables to deities, Lainingthou Sanamahi and Leimarel Sidabi in the Sanamahi Temple of Imphal.

=== Mera Hou Chongba ===
Mera Hou Chongba (ꯃꯦꯔꯥ ꯍꯧ ꯆꯣꯡꯕ) is celebrated on the 15th lunar day of the Mera month of the Meitei calendar. Its main theme is the unity and love between the Meitei people and the hill people (tribesmen communities and in particular with the Zeliangrong Nagas) of Manipur.

On this day, all the representatives of the hill tribes come down to the Imphal Valley, and gather at the Sana Konung (Royal Palace), and perform their respective traditional and cultural dances and other performing art forms. The day ends with a grand feast, held together with the Meitei people and the tribes, to show brotherhood and oness of all the ethnic groups in the region.

=== Ningol Chakouba ===
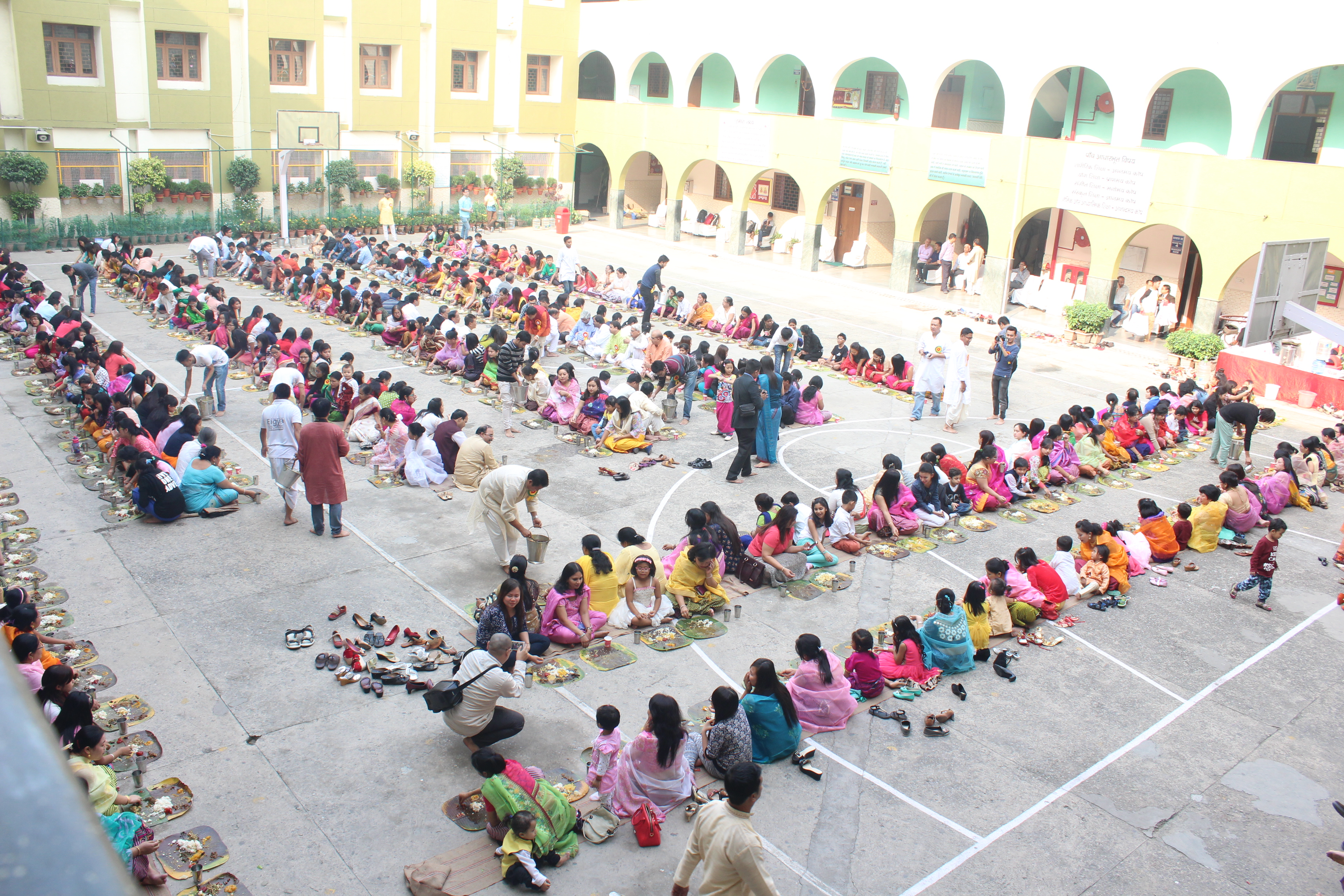
Ningol Chkkouba.

Ningol Chakouba (ꯅꯤꯉꯣꯜ ꯆꯥꯛꯀꯧꯕ) is celebrated on the 2nd lunar day of the Hiyangkei month of the Meitei calendar. The married ladies visit their parental house to have a meal with their paternal family members, especially brothers, fathers, uncles, etc.

The festival is celebrated in the theme of strengthening of the bond of love between married ladies (ningol) and their paternal families.

=== Panthoibi Iratpa ===
Panthoibi Iratpa (ꯄꯥꯟꯊꯣꯢꯕꯤ ꯏꯔꯥꯠꯄ), also spelled as Panthoibi Eratpa, is a sacred festival dedicated to Panthoipi, the Meitei goddess of love. It is celebrated by her devotees, in the temples where she is worshipped.

The festival is celebrated with timing roughly simultaneous with that of Hindu festival of Durga Puja. Thus, both the festival are celebrated together in Manipur. The goddess Panthoibi is also worshipped simultaneously with Hindu goddess Durga since 1714 CE since the reign of King Garib Niwaj (Pamheiba) who embraced Hinduism as the official religion in the kingdom of Manipur.

The Hiyangthang Lairembi Temple in Imphal West district is a notable site for the celebration of the festival in Manipur.

=== Sanamahi Ahong Khong Chingba ===
Sanamahi Ahong Khong Chingba (ꯁꯅꯥꯃꯍꯤ ꯑꯍꯣꯡ ꯈꯣꯡ ꯆꯤꯡꯕ), also known as Sanamahi Cheng Hongba, is a sacred chariot pulling festival dedicated to Sanamahi, the guardian deity of the mankind in Sanamahism. People offer uncooked rice (husked paddy) to the deity. The notable site of the event is Imphal. It was revived in 2018, after having been banned for 350 years. The Imphal celebration brings together many pilgrims who join the procession.

=== Yaoshang ===
Yaosang (ꯌꯥꯎꯁꯪ), also spelled as Yaoshang, is celebrated for five days, starting on the 15th lunar day of the Lamtaa month of the Meitei calendar. Due to its coincidence with the timing of the one day Hindu festival of Holi, people imitate the Hindu culture of using colors to spray one another, because of modern influence. Yaosang is indigenous traditions of the Meitei people. It is considered the most important festival in Manipur.

== Other festivals ==
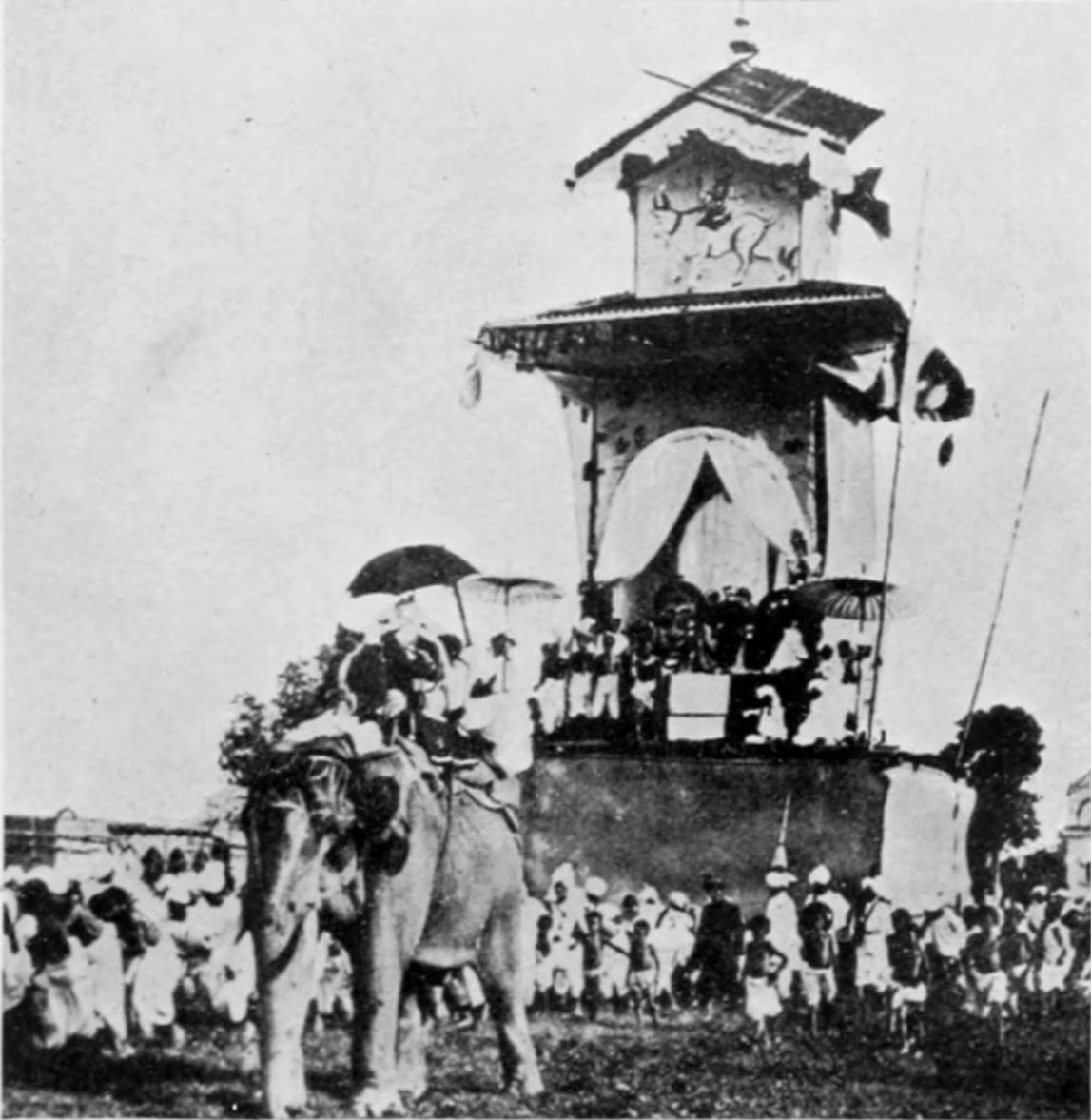
Rath Yatra celebrated by the Meitei Hindus in Manipur.

Since some sections of Meitei people also follow Hinduism and Christianity, the general Hindu and Christian festivals are also celebrated in addition to those of the traditional Meitei religion (Sanamahism).

== See also ==
- Meitei martial arts
- Ancient Meitei language
- Medieval Meitei language
