= South East Asia Cultural Organisation =

International cultural organisation

- South East Asia Cultural Organisation (SEACO)
- The South East Asia Cultural Organisation (SEACO) works for the development of the Sanamahi religion of the Meitei people of Kangleipak (Meitei for 'Manipur') at international level.
- Abbreviation: SEACO
- Named after: Southeast Asia
- Formation: 5 August 2011; 15 years ago (Note: Most of its officially released information are in the Meitei language (officially called the Manipuri language).)
- Founded at: Manipur
- Type: Cultural, international, non-profit, NGO
- Legal status: active
- Purpose: humanitarian, activism, peacekeeping
- Headquarters: Imphal, India
- Locations: Jiribam, India; Moirang Khunou, India
- Origins: Kangleipak (Meitei for 'Manipur')
- Region served: Indian cultural sphere (South Asia and Southeast Asia)
- Official languages: Meitei (officially called Manipuri); English
- General Secretary: Konthoujam Ibochouba Kha-Nganba (as of August 2019); Irengbam Indrajit Meetei (as of December 2021)
- President: Kolomcha Achoubi Khuman
- Advisor: Akham Langol
- Working President: Sanabam Amuchou Mangang
- Chief Advisor: Paonam Labango
- Key people: Jiri Branch; L Nilla Moirangcha (president); K Babudhon Luwang (vice president); Y Naba Khumancha (working president); Sagolsem Sarat Mangang (general secretary); S Chaoba Moirangcha (treasurer); Ch Keba (information & publicity secretary); S Lalmani (advisor); Moirang Khunou branch; L Gouramani (vice president)
- Affiliations: Sanamahism (traditional Meitei religion)

The South East Asia Cultural Organisation (SEACO) is an international cultural organisation that works for the development of the Meitei culture of Kangleipak (Meitei for 'Manipur'). It aims to preserve the unique history, culture, identity, and religion of Manipur. It also advocates to take "extra caution about the issue of preservation of the cultural identity of the Indigenous people in the wake of the present globalization".

== Activism for Sanamahi religion ==
=== Cultural revivalism of religious festivals ===
The SEACO is working on the revival of the Meitei religious festivals, including the worship of Pisatao (Meitei: ꯄꯤꯁꯥꯇꯥꯎ) and the Sanamahi Ahong Khong Chingba (Meitei: ꯁꯅꯥꯃꯍꯤ ꯑꯍꯣꯡ ꯈꯣꯡ ꯆꯤꯡꯕ), which were replaced by the Vishwakarma Puja and the Ratha Yatra respectively in the 18th-19th centuries in Kangleipak (Meitei for 'Manipur').

==== Worship of Lainingthou Pisatao Khutheiba ====
Every year, the SEACO is working on the revivalism of the worship of god Lainingthou Pisatao Khutheiba (Meitei: ꯂꯥꯏꯅꯤꯡꯊꯧ ꯄꯤꯁꯥꯇꯥꯎ ꯈꯨꯠꯍꯩꯕ) among the people, especially craftsmen, artisans and architects of Kangleipak. Historically, the worship of Pisatao was replaced by the Vishwakarma Puja during the reign of King Chandrakirti Singh in Manipur Kingdom. Presently, the SEACO is also providing holy images of the ancient Meitei deity to the devotees.

==== Worship of Humpu Leima Narengshubi ====
The SEACO requested the people of Kangleipak to worship goddess Shingjakhombi Humpu Leima Narengshubi (Meitei: ꯁꯤꯡꯖꯥꯈꯣꯝꯕꯤ ꯍꯨꯝꯄꯨ ꯂꯩꯃ ꯅꯥꯔꯦꯡꯁꯨꯕꯤ), the ancient Meitei deity of education and learning. Historically, her cult was replaced by that of Saraswati during the reign of King Chandrakirti Singh on 12 February 1868.

=== Revivalism of goddess Panthoibi's cult ===
Since October 2012, the SEACO was extending monetary help to the people who organise the worship of ancient Meitei goddess Panthoibi (Panthoibi Iratpa) and who embrace the Meitei religion (Sanamahism) to save the "almost extinct culture, social norms, traditions, belief" of the Meitei people.

=== Efforts of cultural purity ===
While wishing people for Sajibu Nongma Panba (Sajibu Cheiraoba), the traditional New Year day of the Meiteis, the SEACO earnestly requested people not to mix the indigenous culture with the culture of others, like mixing it with that of Charak Puja. According to the SEACO, such mixing of indigenous cultures with non native cultures will defame the rich culture of the Meitei people.

=== Symposium ===
In 2016, the SEACO organised an academic meeting discussing about the revivalism of the Sanamahism, at Ireima Laibung, Pukhoa in Imphal East. During that session, it was said that "reviving of the indigenous cult is the only means for protection and safeguarding" of the identity of the Meitei ethnicity.

=== Advocacy for official recognition ===
In 2020, the SEACO advocated for the official recognition of the Sanamahi religion (Meitei: ꯁꯅꯥꯃꯍꯤ ꯂꯥꯏꯅꯤꯡ, romanised: Sanamahi Laining) as the minority religion of India in the census data of the year 2021. In 2021, supporting the development of the Sanamahism, the SEACO thanked Nongthombam Biren, the then Chief Minister of Manipur, for his promise of the inclusion of the Sanamahi religion in the 2021 census of India.

== Activism in health sector ==
The SEACO urged the authority concerned (National Medical Commission) for increasing the number of seats of the admission to the MBBS in Manipur from 100 to 150 seats, stressing out the fact that the ratio between population of Manipur and the number of doctors serving in the state is highly disproportionate.

== Protests against CAB ==
Before the Citizenship Amendment Bill was passed as the Citizenship (Amendment) Act, 2019, the SEACO protested against the bill for having some controversies. They stated that the bill (if passed as an act) will wipe out the indigenous people from Northeast India, as the provision of the bill allows the granting of citizenship to the migrants in India. They opposed the implementation of the bill (now an act) in the Northeastern India.

== See also ==
- International Sanamahism Students' Association (ISSA)
- Lainingthou Sanamahi Sana Pung (LSSP)
- Lainingthou Sanamahi Temple Board (LSTB)
