= Imoinu =

Meitei Goddess

- Goddess of household, hearth, family, fireplace, kitchen, wealth, peace and prosperity
- Member of Lairembis
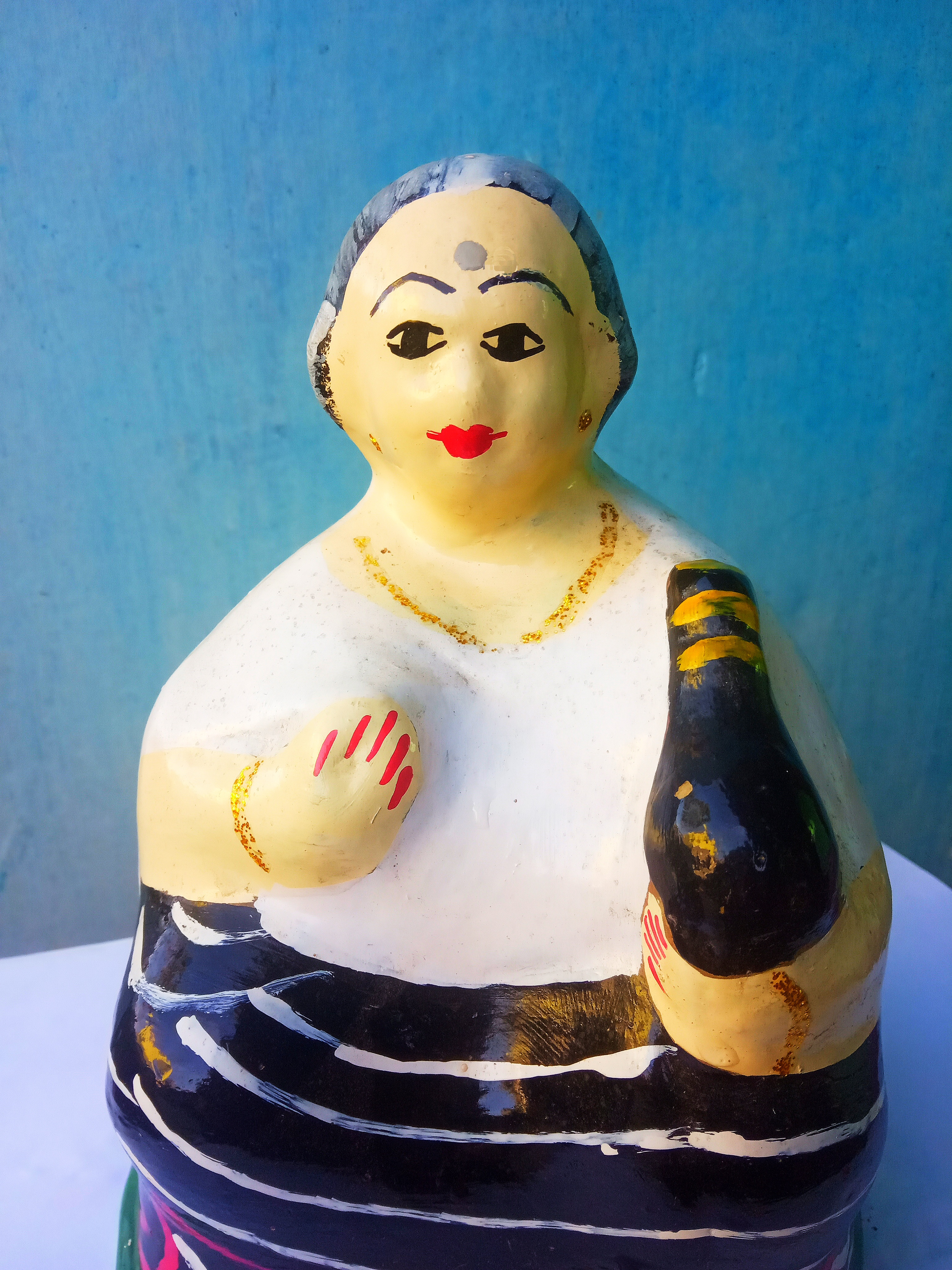
- A terracotta idol of goddess Imoinu
- Other names: Imoinu Ahongbi; Emoinu Ahongbi
- Affiliation: Sanamahism
- Abodes: Phunga Lairu (fireplace), Sanamahi Kachin and Kitchen
- Artifacts: Coin containers
- Symbols: Senphu (Coin container), Chengphu (Rice pot) and Yotsabi (Tripod)
- Texts: PuYas
- Gender: Female
- Region: Manipur
- Ethnic group: Meitei ethnicity
- Festivals: Imoinu Iratpa

Equivalents
- Greek: Hestia
- Hindu: Lakshmi
- Roman: Vesta

Imoinu or Emoinu (Meitei: ꯏꯃꯣꯏꯅꯨ) is a goddess associated with household, hearth, family, fireplace, kitchen, wealth, peace and prosperity in Meitei mythology and religion of Ancient Kangleipak (Antique Manipur). She is frequently associated with Leimarel Sidabi. She is regarded as one of the incarnations or representations of goddess Leimarel Sidabi.

In Meitei mythology, Imoinu is known for her sense of humor. Generally, she is portrayed as "an old woman", as her name means "great grandmother" in Meitei language.

The personality of Imoinu and other goddesses like Panthoibi and Phouoibi depict as well as influence the boldness, courage, independence, righteousness and social honour of Meitei women.

== Etymology and nomenclature ==
The meaning of the name "Emoinu Ahongbi" ("ꯏꯃꯣꯢꯅꯨ ꯑꯍꯣꯡꯕꯤ") can be found by splitting it up word by word. Here, "E" ("ꯏ") refers to human being. "Moi" ("ꯃꯣꯢ" or "ꯃꯣꯏ") refers to rearing. "Nu" ("ꯅꯨ") refers to female deity or goddess. So, "Emoinu" means goddess who rears the human beings. "Ahongbi" means giver of plentiful household properties.

The name Imoinu (Emoinu) stands for the goddess rearing the human beings. The first-word syllable E (/ee/) means human beings, moi (/moy/) meaning rearing and nu meaning Goddess.

Ahongbi means giver of the household properties plentifully. Ibendhou (Ebendhou) meaning great-grandmother.

== Description ==
Dr. Parratt described Emoinu Ahongbi (alias Emoinu Ahong Achaubi) as another form of Goddess Leimarel Sidabi. Leimarel Sidabi is the supreme mother. Imoinu is regarded as an ever resourceful lady. She always gives wealth and prosperity to the mankind. She was shown as having a human appearance. She resides near the fire hearth. The goddess is believed to be the controller and regulator of good conduct and behavior of the human beings.

Imoinu Ahong Achaubi is a deity for good moral behavior, besides wealth and prosperity. As a social code of conduct, a Meitei woman should go out from home only after prayers and worship of the goddess and other household deities. When she returns home, she should pray to the deity.

The Meitei people believed that goddess Imoinu lives in the houses of those who strictly obey her favorite social and moral behavior norms. Imoinu blesses such people with nungai yaifaba (well being and prosperity), watta padaba (having neither shortage nor excess), tekta kaidaba (unaffected by troubles of life) and punshi nungshangba (long life). These are the basic needs of life in the human world.

== Mythology ==
According to ancient Meitei text "Lairembi Nongumlol", the Sky God Salailen Sidaba has seven daughters, whom he sent them down to earth to prosper the human civilization. All the goddesses were given a certain task to serve in their future. In that event, a goddess was given the task to be associated with peace, wealth and prosperity. Later, she came to be known as "Emoinu Ahongbi".

=== Origin ===
After the creation of the sky and the planets, Sidaba (Old Manipuri: Sitapa) (the Supreme Being) ordered His wife, Leimarel Sidabi (Old Manipuri: Leimalel Sitapi) (the first woman) to produce another Leimarel. The second Leimarel would be the second woman. Her responsibility was to take care of the mankind on the planet called earth. Goddess Leimarel Sidabi obeyed her divine husband's order. She created another Leimarel. The appearance of the second Leimarel was similar to the first Leimarel. The first Leimarel named the second Leimarel as "Emoinu Ahongbi".

=== Lover ===
Once goddess Imoinu fell in love with a man. The two became lovers. They swore to be husband and wife. One day, she visited his house in his absence. She discovered that he was already married to another woman. After knowing this, she sacrificed her love. She swore on not to see the man again. She never married to anyone. So, she remained as a virgin goddess.

== Worship ==
=== Ancient worship ===
Imoinu (Emoinu) is a hearth deity. She is annually worshipped on the 12th of the Meitei month of Wakching (December–January interface month). She is also worshipped daily, as part of a Meitei ritual. It is done in every Meitei household with the offering of a little cooked rice before eating.

=== Modern worship ===
Nowadays, there is little or no households with proper phunga lairu (traditional fire hearth). So, a modern fireplace is developed. Here, traditional rites and rituals are performed in honor of the goddess.

There are a lot of changes in the way of worshipping Goddess Imoinu. However, the essence and the importance always remain the same as forever.

=== Abode ===
There are two major places in a household where the deity could be worshipped:-

- One abode is at the fireplace "Phunga Lairu" of the kitchen of the household.
- Another place is at the "Sanamahi Kachin", the South western corner of the household.

=== Ritual ===
Ebendhou Emoinu is offered from the first serving of every meal prepared in a Meitei household. The serving is made by placing three servings of the cooked rice on a plate that is set aside. These offerings should be only vegetarian foods or fish.

The household members are asked to maintain discipline, be respectful, and be tidy so as to please Emoinu.

== Festival ==
The Imoinu Iratpa (Emoinu Eratpa) is a religious festival dedicated to goddess Imoinu (Emoinu). It is celebrated on the 12th of Wakching month (December–January interface month) every year. Traditionally, worship and prayers are performed inside every households. Nowadays, Imoinu Iratpa festival is also celebrated in a larger way in public gathering clubs also.

Wherever the festival is performed, seasonal fruits, vegetables and fish are offered to goddess Imoinu.

Imoinu Iratpa is observed every 12th day of the Meitei lunar month, Waakching (Dec-Jan in gregorian calendar). On this day, especially at night, Emoinu is offered what each can, particularly fish curries as dinner for Emoinu and a variety of cuisines in odd numbers.

== Namesakes ==
=== In commerce ===
Ima Keithel (English: Mothers' Market) is the world's only women-run market. It has three major building complexes. Imoinu Ima Keithel is the Complex Number 2 of the market. It is preceded by Leimarel Sidabi Ima Keithel (Complex Number 1) and followed by Phouoibi Ima Keithel (Complex Number 3). This 500 years old market is in the center of Imphal, Manipur.

== See also ==
- Lainingthou Sanamahi
- Pakhangba
- Atingkok Maru Sidaba
- Lists of deities in Sanamahism
- Lists of Creatures in Meitei Folklore
- Sanamahi creation myth
- Sacred Scriptures of Sanamahism

== Bibliography ==
- Emoinu Ahongbi Tungnapham by Budhichandra, Yumnamcha
- Holy Man by Dhiren Meitei, a.k
- Laiyingthou Lairemmasinggee Waree Seengbul by Neelabi, Sairem
- Leeklam by Apunba Shintha Lup
