= Lainingthou Sanna Mahee Sanna Pung, Kangleipak =

Meitei religious organization

Lainingthou Sanna Mahee Sanna Pung
- Lainingthou Sanna Mahee Sanna Pung, Kangleipak
- Logo of the Lainingthou Sanna Mahee Sanna Pung, Kangleipak
- Abbreviation: LSSP
- Nickname: Meitei: Lainingthou Sanamahi Sanapung
- Named after: Lainingthou Sanamahi of Sanamahi religion
- Formation: 9 October 2013; 13 years ago (Note: As its 3rd foundation day was celebrated on 9 October 2016.)
- Founded at: Kangleipak (Meitei for 'Manipur')
- Type: Nonprofit, NGO
- Legal status: active
- Headquarters: Imphal, India
- Origins: Kangleipak (Meitei for 'Manipur')
- Region served: India (Northeast India) and Bangladesh
- Official language: Meitei language (officially called Manipuri language)
- General Secretary: Angom Lonja Alepa (till August 2021)
- Working President: Moirangthem Meghachandra Mangang
- Khwailakpa: Thokchom Ibungo
- Subsidiaries: Meetei Chanu
- Affiliations: Sanamahism

The Lainingthou Sanna Mahee Sanna Pung, Kangleipak, also known as the Lainingthou Sanamahi Sanapung (LSSP), is a non-governmental organization of the followers of the Sanamahism (traditional Meitei religion), dedicated to God Lainingthou Sanamahi and other ancient Meitei deities of Kangleipak (Meitei for 'Manipur').

== Reviving extinct culture ==
In June 2018, the LSSP organised the religious festival of Sanamahi Ahong Khong Chingba (Meitei: ꯁꯅꯥꯃꯍꯤ ꯑꯍꯣꯡ ꯈꯣꯡ ꯆꯤꯡꯕ) which was banned and extinct for 350 consecutive years. It was celebrated once again for peace and prosperity of the people in the Manipuri metropolis of Imphal. The religious event is accustomed to be celebrated on the 15th day of the Meitei lunar month of "Inga" (Meitei: ꯏꯉꯥ).

== Meetei Chanu pageant ==
The Lainingthou Sanamahi Sanapung (LSSP) organises the Meetei Chanu (Meitei: ꯃꯤꯇꯩ ꯆꯅꯨ), a beauty pageant with the aim to preserve the Meitei cultural tradition among the generations of the present day youths, as well as to impart knowledge of the traditions and the customs of the Sanamahi religion to Meitei women. To organise the contest, the LSSP formed a committee under the supervision of Leishemba Sanajaoba (Meitei: ꯂꯩꯁꯦꯝꯕ ꯁꯅꯥꯖꯥꯎꯕ), the titular King of Manipur.

== Ningol Chakouba celebration ==
On 29 November 2015, the Lainingthou Sanamahi Sanapung celebrated Ningol Chakouba (Meitei: ꯅꯤꯉꯣꯜ ꯆꯥꯛꯀꯧꯕ) festival at Leimayon Arts Centre, Chingamakha in Imphal. The event was attended by Leishemba Sanajaoba (Meitei: ꯂꯩꯁꯦꯝꯕ ꯁꯅꯥꯖꯥꯎꯕ), the titular king of Manipur.

== Cheiraoba gift exchange ==
In April 2017, the Lainingthou Sanamahi Sana Pung organised a gift exchange program in accordance to the Sajibu Nongma Panba Cheiraoba (Meitei: ꯁꯖꯤꯕꯨ ꯅꯣꯡꯃ ꯄꯥꯟꯕ ꯆꯩꯔꯥꯎꯕ) to celebrate the spirit of fraternity, at Leimayol Art Centre, Singjamei Chinga Makha in Imphal. During the event, women members of the LSSP also presented gifts to Leishemba Sanajaoba (Meitei: ꯂꯩꯁꯦꯝꯕ ꯁꯅꯥꯖꯥꯎꯕ), the titular King of Manipur.

== International activism ==
In 2018, the Lainingthou Sanamahi Sana Pung, along with the United Committee Manipur, the Manipur PCC, the Manipur Pradesh Trinamool Congress and the Shiv Sena, raised their voices against the illegal encroachment issues with the India–Myanmar border areas.

== See also ==
- International Sanamahism Students' Association (ISSA)
- Lainingthou Sanamahi Kiyong
  - Nongmaiching Ching
- Marjing
  - Marjing Polo Statue
  - Marjing Polo Complex
  - Heingang Ching
- Nikhil Manipuri Mahasabha
- Kangla
  - Pakhangba Temple, Kangla
  - Kangla Nongpok Thong
  - Kangla Nongpok Torban
