= LSSP =

LSSP may refer to:

- Lainingthou Sanamahi Sana Pung, a non-governmental organization of the followers of the Sanamahism
- Lanka Sama Samaja Party, a political party in Sri Lanka
