= Ningol Chakkouba =

Traditional Meitei festival

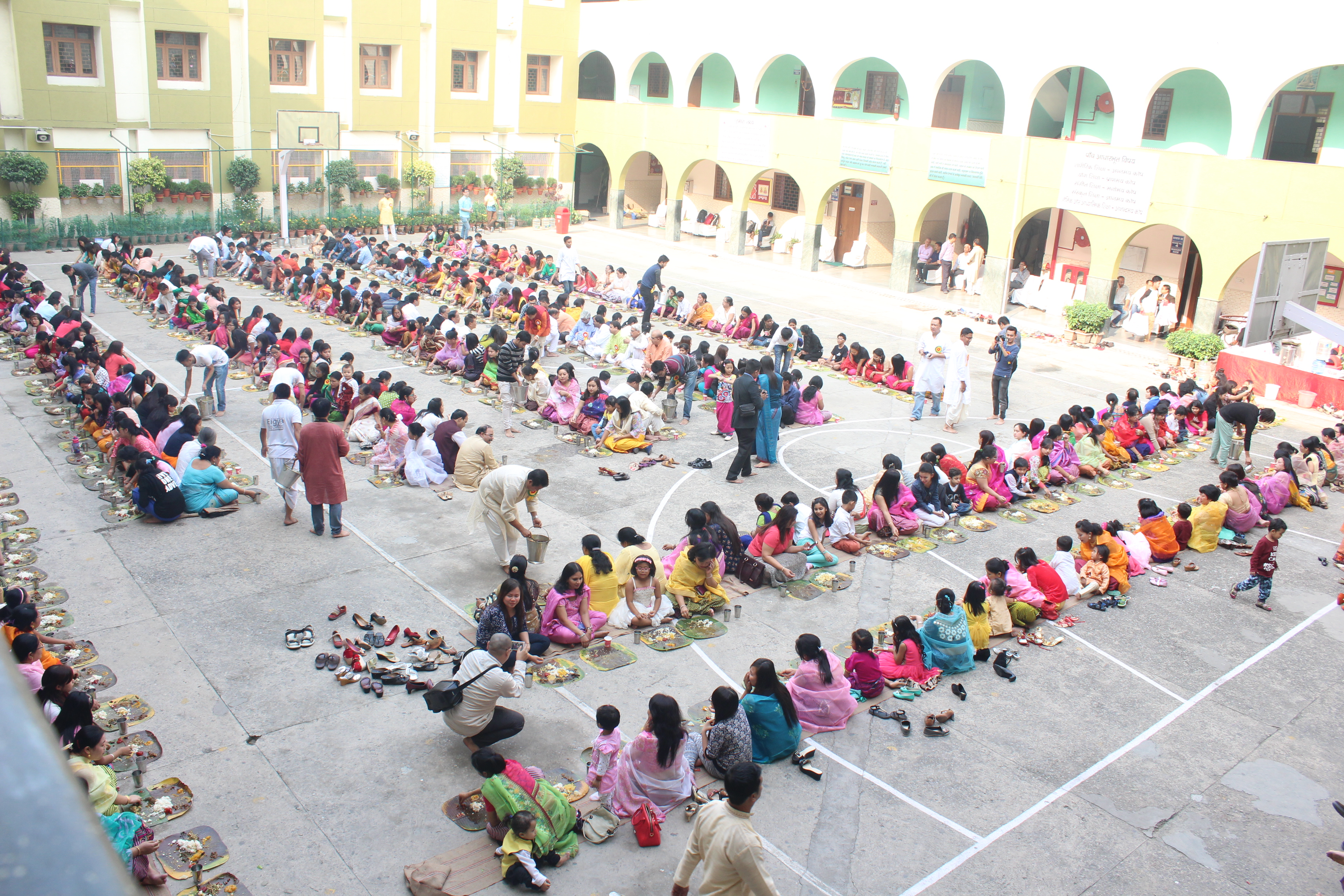
- Celebration of Ningol Chakkouba in Delhi
- Observed by: Meiteis
- Type: Meitei people
- Significance: Celebrates the bond between married women and their paternal home
- Celebrations: Reunion of married women " Ningols " with their siblings and parents for a grand feast. Presentation of gifts to the ningols.
- Begins: 2nd day of the Hiyangei month of the Meitei lunar calendar
- Date: as per Meitei calendar
- Frequency: Once a Year

Ningol Chakkouba (Meitei: ꯅꯤꯉꯣꯜ ꯆꯥꯛꯀꯧꯕ, lit. 'feast for married women'), also known as Hiyangei Nini Paanba (Meitei for 'second day of the month of Hiyaangei'), is a traditional Meitei festival, celebrated on the second day of the lunar month of Hiyangei (October–November). It is a celebration of bond of love between married women and their paternal families. It is a major festival for the Meitei communities originated from Manipur State of India. It has been celebrated by Meities residing in neighboring states of Manipur like Assam as well as in Bangladesh and Myanmar. Other communities in Manipur also share the celebration and it's a public holiday. Manipuri diasporas in many Indian cities outside Manipur, including to Bangalore, Delhi, Kolkata,Mumbai, Pune, Shillong, and Silchar, as well as in other countries, like Australia, Canada, United States as well as in South Korea, Japan and Taiwan hosted the festival.

== Celebration ==
On these occasions of Ningol Chakkouba, the parents graciously receive their wedded daughters at their "mapam," or paternal house, for a splendid feast.

The married women, adorned in their most exquisite traditional attire, arrive in the company of their children. They bestow upon their parents' gifts imbued with blessings for both the daughters and their progeny.

It is customary for the son of the family to extend a formal invitation to his sister a week in advance of the gathering.

Though devoid of specific religious connotations, this cherished social celebration serves to fortify the bonds of love and affection between married women and their familial ties. Moreover, it provides a delightful occasion for the reunion of family and friends, some of whom may have journeyed from distant locales.

== See also ==
- Sajibu Nongma Panba - Meitei New year
- Yaoshang - Manipuri Spring Festival
- Heikru Hidongba - Manipuri boat racing festival
