= Mera Chaorel Houba =

Festival of Manipur

Mera Chaorel Houba or Mera Chaoren Houba is the religious festival of Manipur, dedicated to the Lord Lainingthou Sanamahi and Leimarel Sidabi, celebrated by the Meitei people and the indigenous tribal communities of the hills. The day falls on the first lunar day of the month of Mera according to Meitei calendar.

The festival is observed in the theme of solidarity and fraternity of the ethnic groups of the region. The main location of the festival is the Kangla Palace and the Sanamahi Temple, Imphal West district, Manipur, where devotees offer fruits, vegetables, rice, and especially lights and inscences at the temple. The sacred water from the Nungjeng Pukhri, Kangla Palace is also collected and offered to the deities at the temple.

== See also ==
- Panthoibi Iratpa
- Imoinu Iratpa
