= Sidaba Mapu =

Ancient Meitei God

- Member of Meitei Guardians of the Directions
- Other names: Supreme God, creator of Universe, sky God, King of the Gods, Atingkok Maru Sidaba, Atiya Kuru Sidaba, Epuroi Salailen Sidaba, Yaibirel Sidaba
- Meitei: no: ꯁꯤꯗꯕ ꯃꯄꯨ
- Affiliation: Sanamahism
- Abode: Heaven
- Mantra: Hayum Sidaba! Salailen Sidaba! (Meitei: ꯍꯌꯨꯝ ꯁꯤꯗꯕ! ꯁꯂꯥꯢꯂꯦꯟ ꯁꯤꯗꯕ)
- Weapon: thunderbolt, spear
- Texts: Malem Leishemlol, Malem Chakkhong, Leithak Leikharol
- Gender: Male
- Ethnic group: Meitei
- Festivals: Lai Haraoba

Genealogy
- Consort: Leimarel Sidabi and Tampha Lairembi
- Children: Lainingthou Sanamahi; Pakhangba; Nongshaba; Nongthang Leima; Emoinu; Irai Leima; many others

Equivalents
- Greek: Zeus
- Hindu: Brahma
- Norse: Odin, Thor
- Roman: Jupiter

Sidaba Mapu (Meitei: ꯁꯤꯗꯕ ꯃꯄꯨ, lit. 'immortal God') or Salailel (Meitei: ꯁꯂꯥꯢꯂꯦꯜ) is the Supreme god, creator of Universe and the Sky God in Sanamahism, the indigenous religion of Manipur. According to Meitei mythology, Sidaba Mapu, being the Creator of the Universe, from a philosophical theory known as Leithak Leikharol Nongsemlon and Leisemlon (Leisemlon Ahanpa).

== See also ==
- Meitei deities
