= Sanamahi creation myth =

Creation narratives of Sanamahism

- The symbol of Sanamahism
- Description: The story of Lainingthou Sanamahi is entirely a myth, he is not known for his existence historically, he is believed to be the form of Supreme universal God in the form of human as found on a earthen pot Humnitag oiba nawa oina Chafu ahingbada yaormkhi as a newborn child of 3 days according to Meitei mythology

The Sanamahi creation myth is the traditional creation myth of Sanamahism, a religion of the Meitei, Chothe, Komhreng, Kabui, Anāl, and, before their conversion to Christianity, Tangkhul people in Manipur, India.

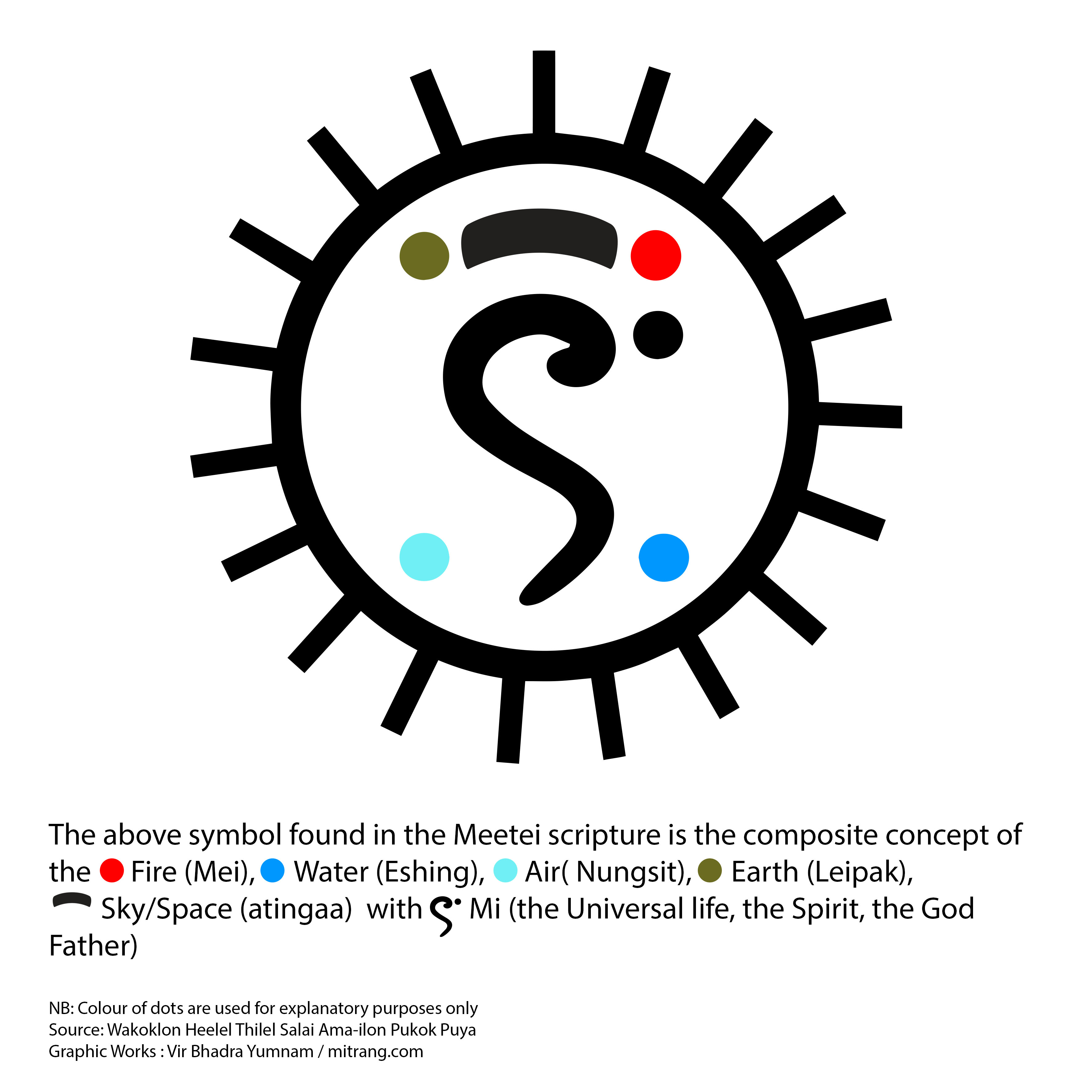
Symbol of Sanamahism (explanation)

== Koubru, the first place for human habitation ==
After Godfather Eepung Loinapa Apakpa created humans under his guidance and makes people's settlement to the place where God's living place in Earth where there were many fruits, eatable can be found for living.

== See also ==
- Sanamahism
- Lists of Creatures in Meitei Folklore
- Lists of deities in Sanamahism
- Lai Haraoba
- Meitei mythology
- Creation myth
