= Leimarel Sidabi =

Meitei earth Goddess

- Goddess of earth, nature and household
- Member of Imung Lais
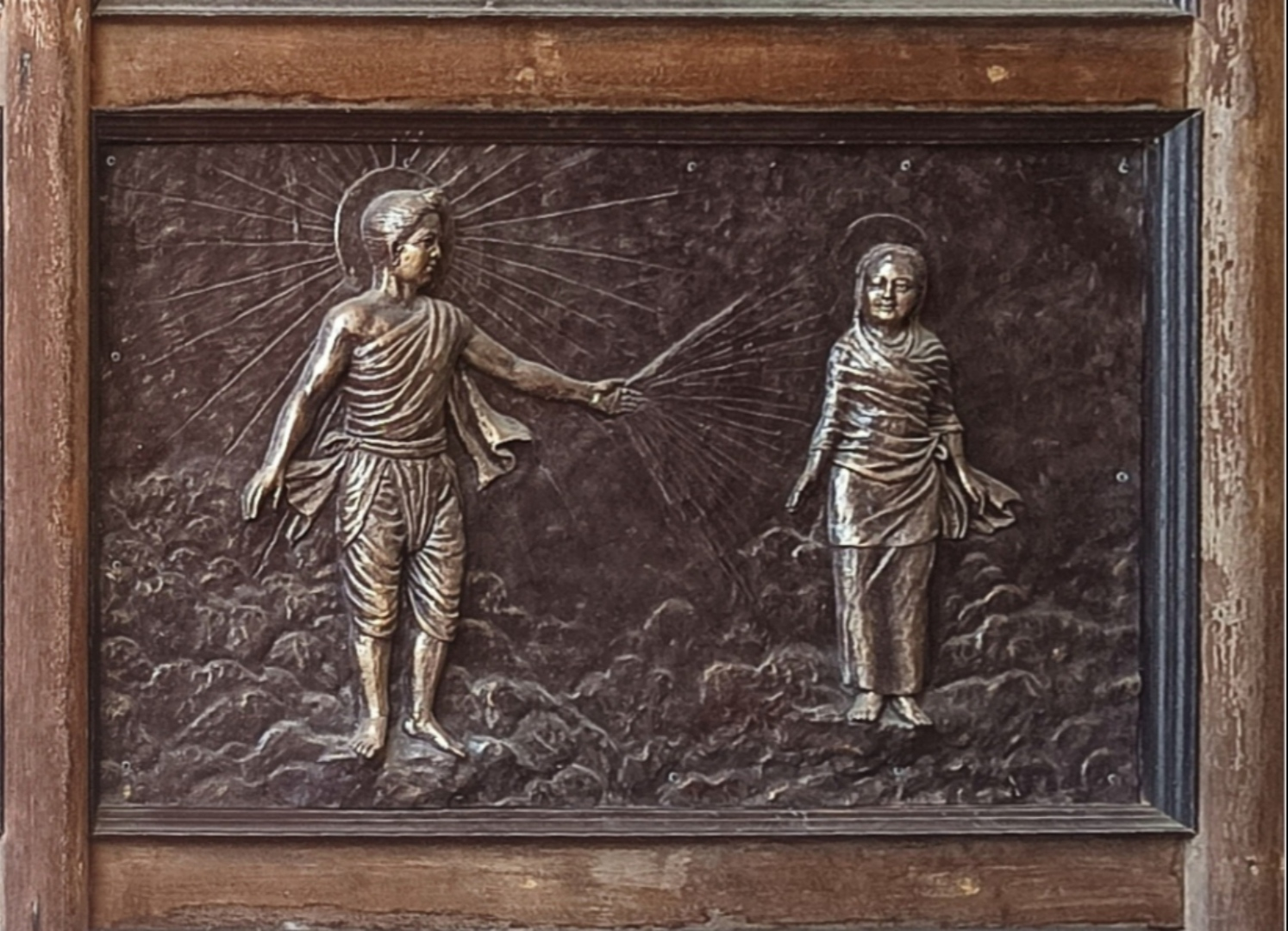
- A relief depicting the creation of Leimalen by Salailen, the Supreme God
- Other names: Malem Leima
- Meitei script: no: ꯂꯩꯃꯔꯦꯜ ꯁꯤꯗꯕꯤ
- Affiliation: Meitei mythology (Manipuri mythology) and Meitei religion (Sanamahism)
- Abode: Sanamahi Kachin
- Animals: Taoroinai
- Symbol: Water pot
- Texts: Wakoklon Heelel Thilel Salai Amailon Pukok, Leithak Leikharol, Leisemlon, Sakok Lamlen and many others
- Gender: Female
- Region: Manipur
- Ethnic group: Meitei
- Festivals: Lai Haraoba

Genealogy
- Consort: Salailen (Soraren)
- Children: Sanamahi (foster) and Pakhangba (biological)

Equivalents
- Greek: Gaia
- Roman: Terra

Leimarel Sidabi (Meitei: ꯂꯩꯃꯔꯦꯜ ꯁꯤꯗꯕꯤ) or Leimalel Sitapi (Meitei: ꯂꯩꯃꯂꯦꯜ ꯁꯤꯇꯄꯤ) is a goddess in Sanamahism, the indigenous religion of Manipur. She is the highest female divinity in the Meitei pantheon. She is the goddess of earth, of nature and the household. She is revered as the mother of every living being in the universe.

Presently, the market complex number 1 is named after her at the Ima Keithel (Mothers' market), the world's only market run exclusively by women.

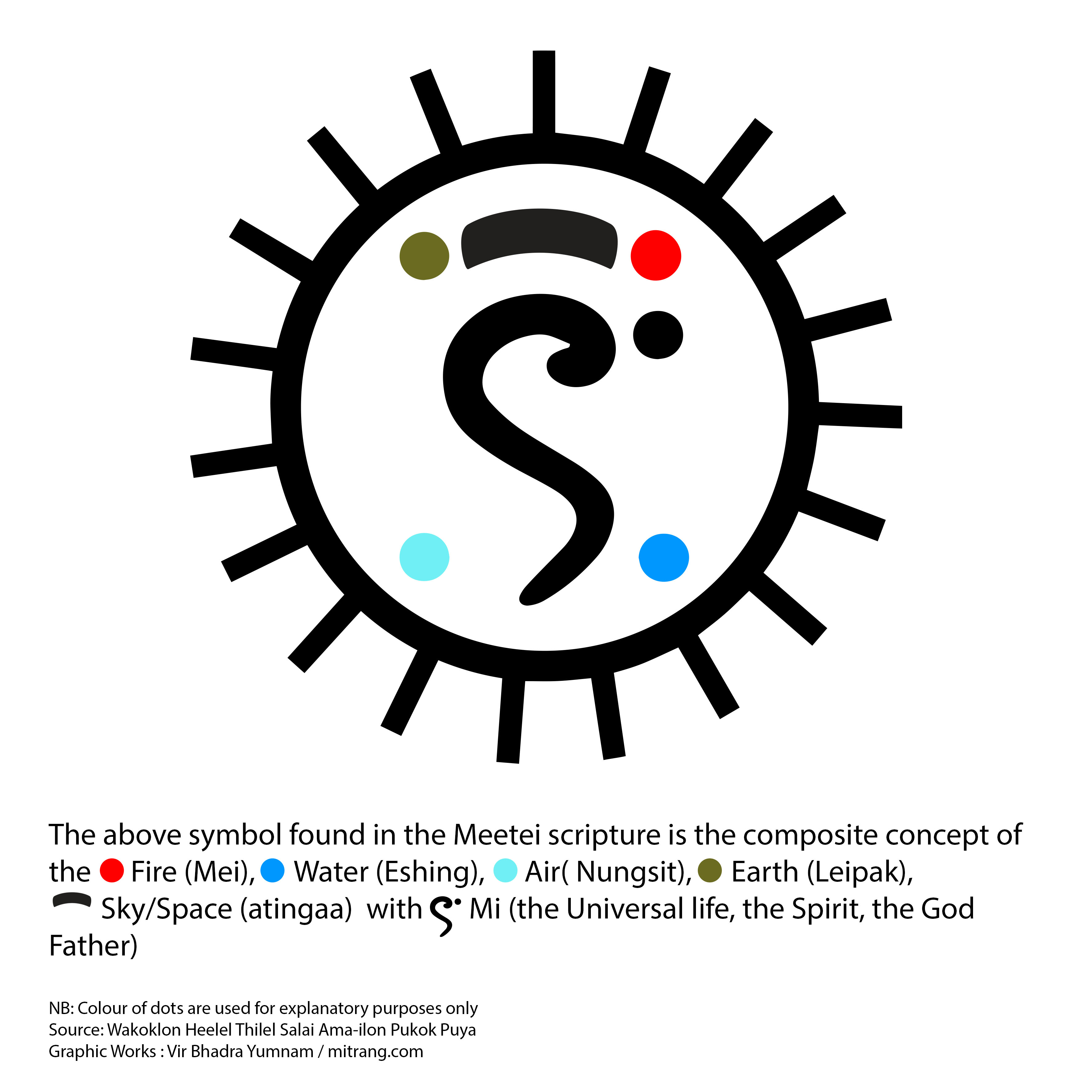
Symbol with explanation

== Description ==
Leimarel is the eternal mother goddess. In ancient times, the ruling royal couples sat in the laplen ka (central room), facing the sacred place of Leimarel. It was believed that men and women originated from Leimarel's womb. A house symbolises the Mother in traditional Meitei cosmic beliefs.

== Mythology ==
The supreme creator Atingkok asked his two sons, Sanamahi and Pakhangba to run in a race around the world. The winner would become the ruler of the world. Sanamahi was stronger than his younger brother, Pakhangba. He started his journey. Pakhangba wept to his mother, Leimarel Sidabi. She told him the secret behind the throne of the universe. The secret is that going around the throne of the Supreme Being is equivalent to going around the universe. So, Pakhangba went around the Supreme Being, his father. Thus, he won the race and became the ruler of the universe. When Sanamahi returned home, he found his younger brother sitting on the throne. He got angry. He attacked Pakhangba. Pakhangba ran away. He hid himself among seven lairembis (celestial divine maidens).

According to some legends, Ima Leimaren (mother Leimarel) takes care of the market. She brings peace and harmony by doing so. This tradition is still maintained by women, who are thought of as the descendants of the Ima.

During the infant world, the creator God Atingkok Maru Sidaba asked Leimarel Sidabi to produce another goddess from herself. After the production, the new goddess was named as Emoinu, who was sent to earth as the guardian goddess of humankind.

== Texts ==
Several ancient texts (puyas) contain information about Leimarel, such as Leimaren Naoyom, the Leimaren Langon, the Leimaren Mingkhei the Leimalen Mingkhei, the Leimaren Shekning Lasat, and the Leimaren Ungoiron.

== Worship ==
Leimarel Sidabi and her son Sanamahi are worshipped in the first room of every Meitei household. Leimarel doesn't like the morning sunlight, so, houses of Loi castes mainly face the south. She also lives in water, so, she is worshipped in an isaiphu, an earthen pitcher or terracotta pot containing water.< There are no images kept to represent the two deities inside their abode. A senior woman of a house fills the earthen pot with fresh water after taking a holy bath. Fresh flowers, fruits, vegetables and rice are offered to the goddess. Prayers are also offered to protect the family members from every troubles. Maibas also perform rites and rituals, such as chanting hymns and making offerings to Leimaren.

== Shayon (incarnations) ==
Leimarel Sidabi is known for her various incarnation in different forms possessing diverse attributes.

The following are her incarnations:

Divine forms	Description
Chang Ning Leima	She is the goddess and consort of Lord Khoriphaba, the prince of sky kingdom.
Emoinu	She is the goddess of wealth, prosperity and happiness.
Ereima	She is the goddess of water and bodies of water.
Hikubi Yaikubi	She is the goddess of gems and wealth.
Ngaleima	She is the goddess of fish and aquatic life.
Nongthang Leima	She is the goddess of thunder and rain.
Panthoibi	She is the goddess of courage, war and nostalgia.
Phouoibi	She is the goddess of paddy, prosperity and harvest.
Pithai Khongdaibi	She is the mother goddess of all.
Silleima	She is the goddess of work and occupations.
Thumleima	She is the goddess of salt and nutrients.

== Festivals ==
Leimarel Sidabi and her son Sanamahi are mainly worshipped in many religious occasions. Some are Sajibu Cheiraoba and Saroi-Khangba. Cheiraoba is the Meitei new year (Manipuri new year) festival. Saroi-Khangba is a religious event to please the evil spirits.

- In the festival of Mera Chaorel Houba, Lainingthou Sanamahi and Leimarel Sidabi are worshipped in the famous Sanamahi Temple by offering fruits and vegetables.
- In the Meitei festival of Sajibu Cheiraoba, Leimarel Sidabi is worshipped by offering her the uncooked rice by the devotees.

== Pantheon ==
Leimarel Sidabi, is worshipped in Manipur, Assam, Tripura, Bangladesh and Myanmar too. In Myanmar, one of the famous shrines of Ema Leimarel Sidabi is located at the Ye Ki Bauk village, where the Meitei people worship her.

== In Arts ==
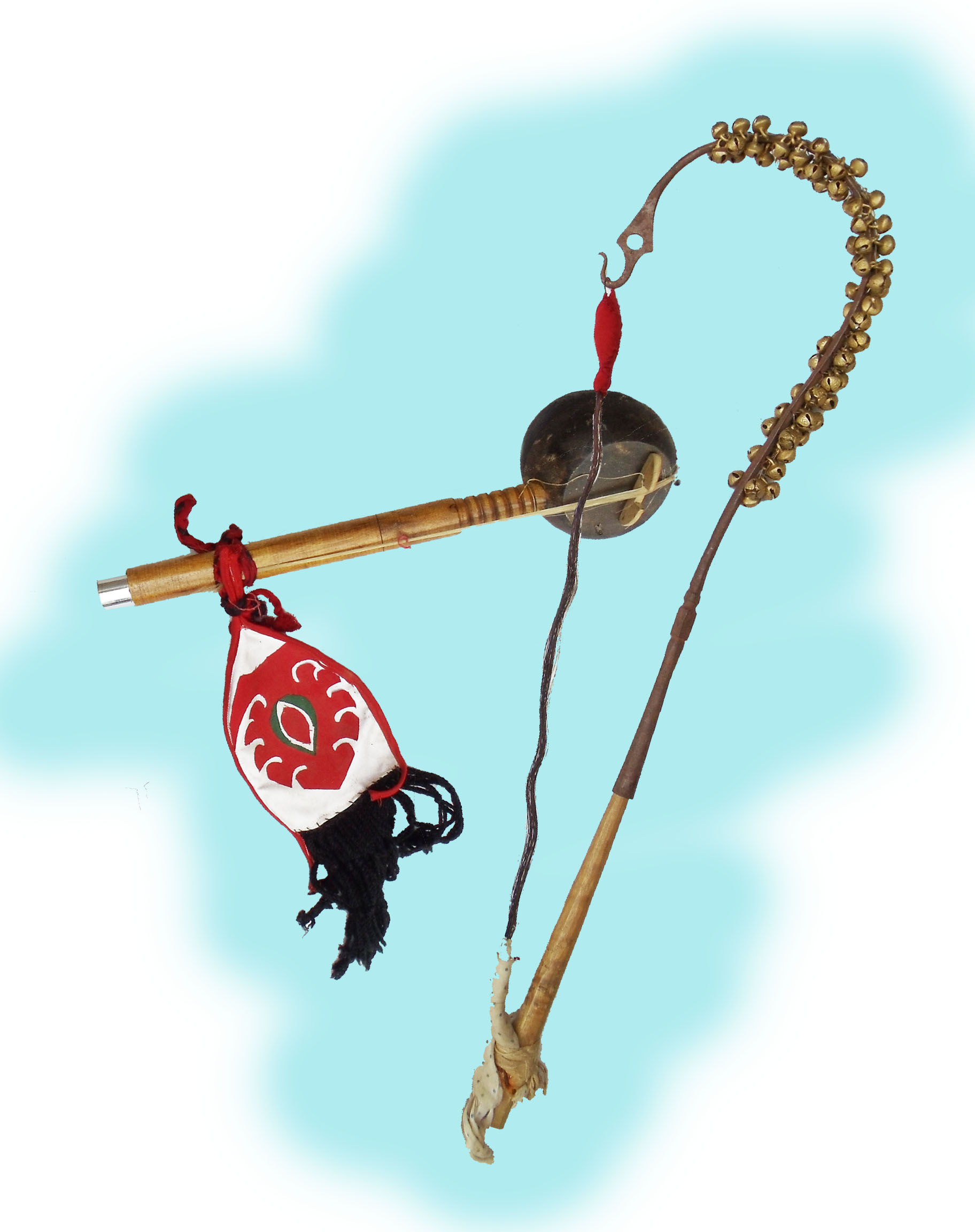
Pena (musical instrument) is used to perform various musical rhythms associated with Leimarel (Old Manipuri: Leimalel).

Among the nine forms of musical rhythms (seisaks) of the pena is the Leimarel sheisak, played during Lai Haraoba.

== Namesakes ==
=== In commerce ===
Ima Keithel (English: Mothers' Market) is the world's only women run market. It has 3 major complexes. Leimarel Sidabi Ima Keithel is the Complex Number 1 of the market. It is followed by Imoinu Ima Keithel (Complex Number 2) and Phouoibi Ima Keithel (Complex Number 3). This 500 year old market is in the center of Imphal, Manipur.

=== In geography ===
The Leimarel Hill is a hill in Manipur. Trekkers go here for panoramic viewing of 360 degrees of Loktak Lake.
