= Sanamahism =

Indigenous religion of the Meitei people

- ꯁꯅꯥꯃꯍꯤ ꯂꯥꯏꯅꯤꯡ
- The Symbol of Sanamahism
- Type: Ethnic religion
- Classification: Animism
- Scripture: Puyas
- Theology: Polytheism
- Region: Manipur, India
- Language: Meitei (Amailon)
- Origin: 3500+ years ago
- Number of followers: 222,422 (2011)

Sanamahism (Meitei: ꯁꯅꯥꯃꯍꯤ ꯂꯥꯏꯅꯤꯡ, romanized: Sanamahi laining, lit. 'liquid gold religion'), also known as Meiteism (Meitei: ꯃꯩꯇꯩ ꯂꯥꯢꯅꯤꯡ, romanized: Meitei laining, lit. 'Meitei religion'), or Lainingthouism (Meitei: ꯂꯥꯢꯅꯤꯡꯊꯧ ꯂꯥꯢꯅꯤꯡ, romanized: Lainingthou laining) is an ethnic religion of the Meitei people of Manipur, in Northeast India. It is a polytheistic religion and is named after Lainingthou Sanamahi, one of the most important deities of the Meitei faith.

Sanamahi is the eldest son of the supreme god Sidaba Mapu and the supreme goddess Leimarel Sidabi. Traditionally every Meitei household, irrespective of the religion, worships Sanamahi and Leimarel Sidabi. Sanamahism does not have a religious head but has a body, the Maru Loishang, that oversees the main religious activities and governs all affairs of the religion, including the conduct of priest and priestess. The Maru Loishang also acts as a court for religious disputes. There are three main departments under the Manu Loishang, namely, the Amaiba Loishang, the Pena Asheiba Loishang, and the Amaibi Loishang. These departments have existed since the reign of King Meidingu Hongnemyoi Khunjao Naothingkhong of Manipur in 662 CE.

== Deities ==
The deities in Sanamhism can be classified as principal deities, ancestral deities, or apokpa, regional deities called Lam Lai or Umang Lai, and the ancestral deities worshipped by particular Meitei clans (Yek Lai) and families (Saghei Lai).

There are five main deities in Sanamahism:

- Lainingthou Sanamahi, protector and guardian god of mankind.
- Sidaba Mapu, creator of the universe.
- Pakhangba, ruler of the universe and destroyer of evil.
- Leimarel Sidabi, Earth goddess.
- Imoinu Ahongbi, an incarnation of Leimarel, and a goddess of wealth and prosperity.

Other important gods and goddesses include Panthoibi, Lainingthou Nongpok Ningthou, Lainingthou Koubru, Ibudhou Marjing, Thongalel, Wangbren, Eputhou Thangjing, Kounu, Nongshaba, Nongthang Leima, and Irai Leima.

The Umang Lais are often regarded as aspects or incarnations of the main deities. The worship of Umang Lais and the ritual that this entails, referred to as the Umang Lai Haraoba, is one of the main religious festivals in Sanamahism. The Umang Lais are associated with sacred groves, also called Umang Lai. There are similarities between the Umang Lais and the Nat deities of Myanmar.

All the deities are denoted by the universal term Lai which means "God" in the Manipuri language/Meiteilon. When referring to a male deity, the terms Lainingthou, Ebhudhou or Epa are used while the terms; Lairembi, Ebhendhou or Ema are used to refer to a female deity. Lairembi is mostly used for the Umang Lais.

== Origin ==
The first mentions are found in the Cheitharol Kumbaba, the Court Chronicles of the kings of Manipur, starting from the king Nongda Lairen Pakhangba, who traditionally ruled for more than a century, from 33 to 154 CE, though modern scholarship, including Sujit Mukherjee, give a range of 21 years, from 33 to 54 CE.

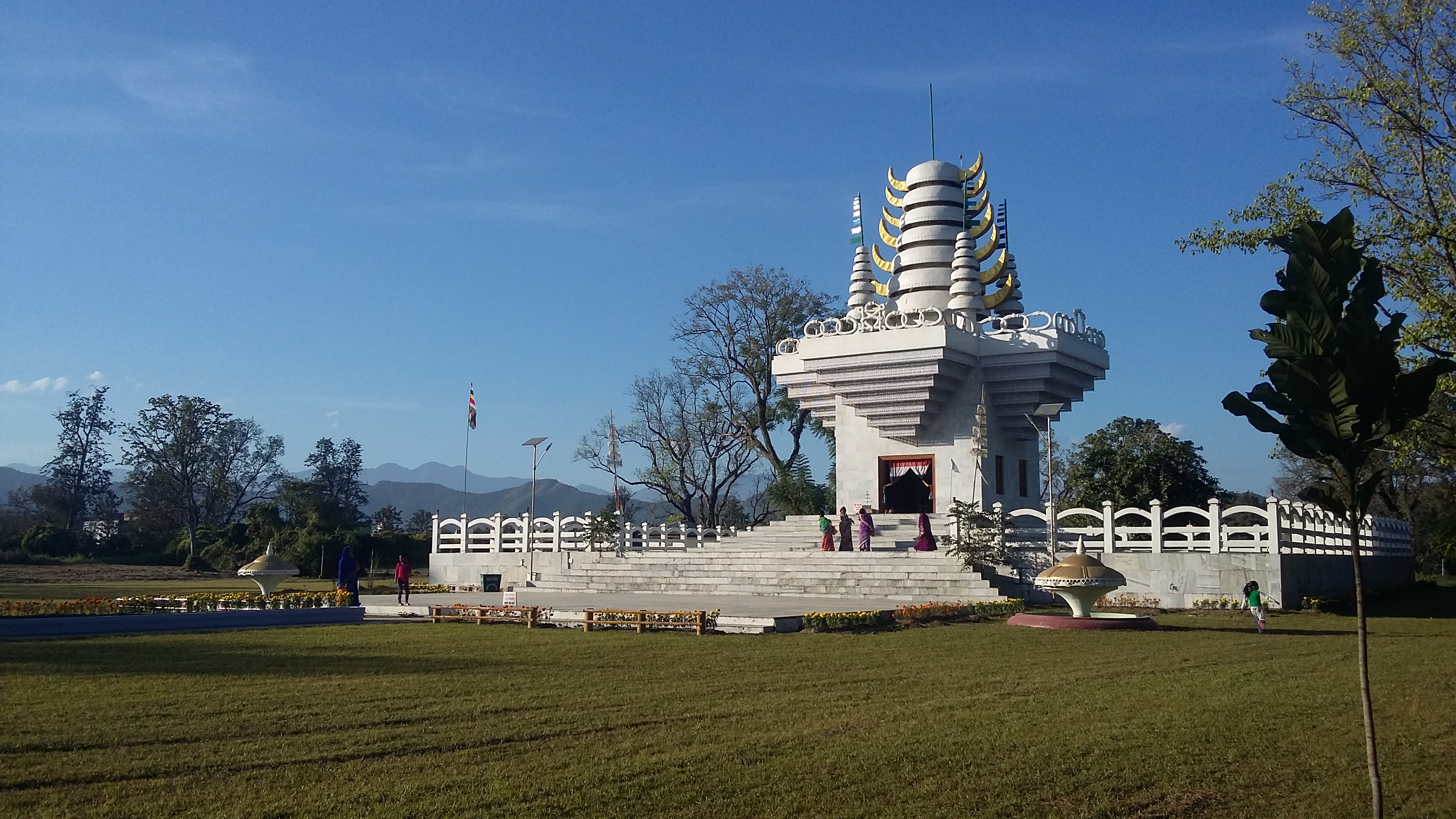
Kangla Pakhangba Laishang, the temple of God Pakhangba of Sanamahi religion inside the Kangla Fort, Imphal West, Manipur

== Philosophy ==
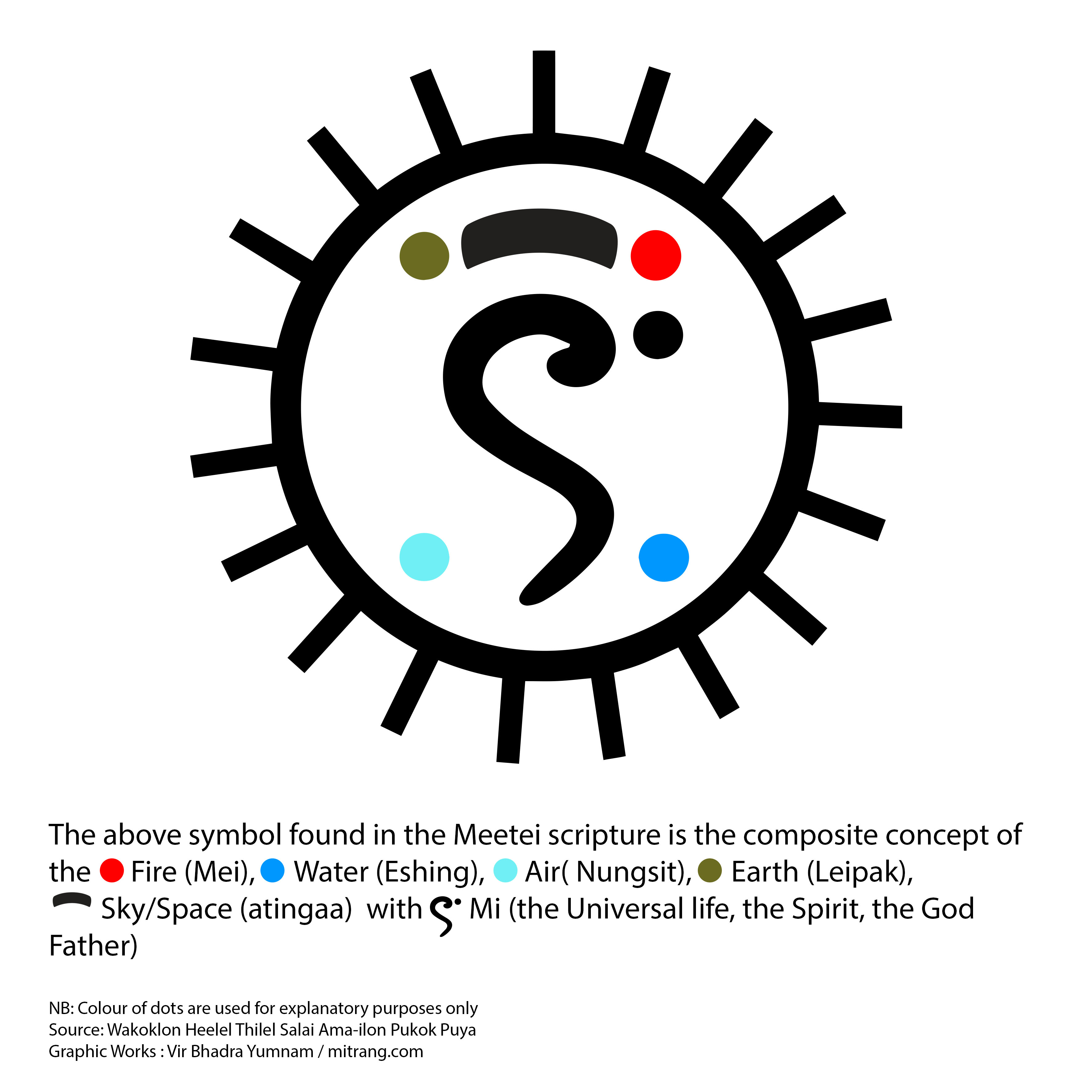
Philosophical symbol of traditional Meitei religion finds its explanation in the holy and sacred Wakoklon Heelel Thilel Salai Amailon Pukok Puya text.

Philosophy of Sanamahism, also called Sanamahist philosophy (ꯁꯅꯥꯃꯍꯤ ꯋꯥꯡꯎꯂꯣꯟ) or Meitei religious philosophy (ꯃꯩꯇꯩ ꯂꯥꯏꯅꯤꯡ ꯋꯥꯡꯎꯂꯣꯜ), is a religious aspect of Meitei philosophy. It focuses on the origin of life, the role of blood, and the spiritual traditions of the Meitei people of ancient Kangleipak (early Manipur).

=== Life and blood ===
Sanamahism emphasizes that blood (Ee) is essential for life. Blood is considered the origin of all living beings on Earth. This life-blood is called Sitapa Mapu, Ama, Yaibiren Sitapa, or Epuroi Sitapa. It flows through all living beings and is also manifested as Sanamahi, who is referred to as Sanamahi Mahirel.

This concept represents the common genetic pool of all living beings. Sitapa Mapu, as the source of this life-blood, came to Earth as the first son of Salailel Sitapa and Leimalel Sitapi, named Sanamahi, to spread life. This understanding is the reason the religion is called Sanamahism.

=== Shumang Kangleipung ===
A key practice in Meitei culture is the leipung, also known as Shumang Kangleipung, a courtyard mound in every home. This represents the primeval mound, the first center of creation. The leipung connects to similar concepts in Egyptian and Mesopotamian civilizations, where primeval mounds or pyramids symbolized creation.

Every Meitei family maintains a leipung, which may contain langthrei plants (equivalent practice of that of the tulsi plants for Meitei Hindus). Both are medicinal and ceremonial. The mound should not be barren, as it symbolizes life. Leipungs are central to ceremonies, including birth, marriage, and death.

=== Species survival and continuity ===
Classical Meitei traditions such as Uyallon, Shafaron, Lanfaron, and Ushil Shinba show respect for life-blood. They involve rituals before cutting trees, hunting animals, or after battle. These practices emphasize avoiding harm to trees, animals, and humans without valid reasons, promoting species survival and protecting the biosphere.

Some rituals, like making small cuts on trees during Uyallon, may have practical reasons, such as releasing poisonous gases. These practices combine spiritual beliefs with early ecological awareness.

=== Origin of life and spread ===
The Meitei texts describe the origin of life on Earth. Songs and puyas, such as the Wakoklon Heelel Thilel Salai Amailon Pukok Puya (WHTSAP), explain reproduction and the first center of habitation at Mount Koupalu. Life spreads from there through the descendants of Sitapa Mapu.

==== Sitapa Mapu ====
Sitapa Mapu is central to Meitei culture and philosophy. Represented as Ama, Sitapa Mapu symbolizes the male and female life-blood, the seed of life for creating living beings. In Meitei belief, blood contains the essence of life and knowledge. The human body carries Sitapa Mapu's life-blood. The body is considered a temple, as it holds the genetic material of ancestors.

Classical Meitei writing system describe how letters (Eyek Épée Laiyek, Lolshum Mayek, Cheitap/Cheinap Mayek) represent parts of the human body, forming the seed of life (Ama). The Lai Haraoba dancing, dramatic (theatrical) and musical performances illustrate the development of a human body in the womb, showing early knowledge of fetal development and reproduction.

==== Numerals and the concept of zero ====
The Meitei numeral system reflects the development of life from Ama to birth. Phoon (zero) represents the empty womb after the creation of a new life, symbolizing the start of a new life cycle.

=== Origin of priesthood (Amailon) ===
The first Amaiba (priest) and Amaibi (priestess) were Salailel Sitapa and Leimalel Sitapi, who educated their children in spiritual and practical knowledge. In Meitei philosophy, priests were not only performers of rituals but also educators. Religious knowledge focused on life, blood, and safeguarding living beings.

=== Religious philosophy and practices ===
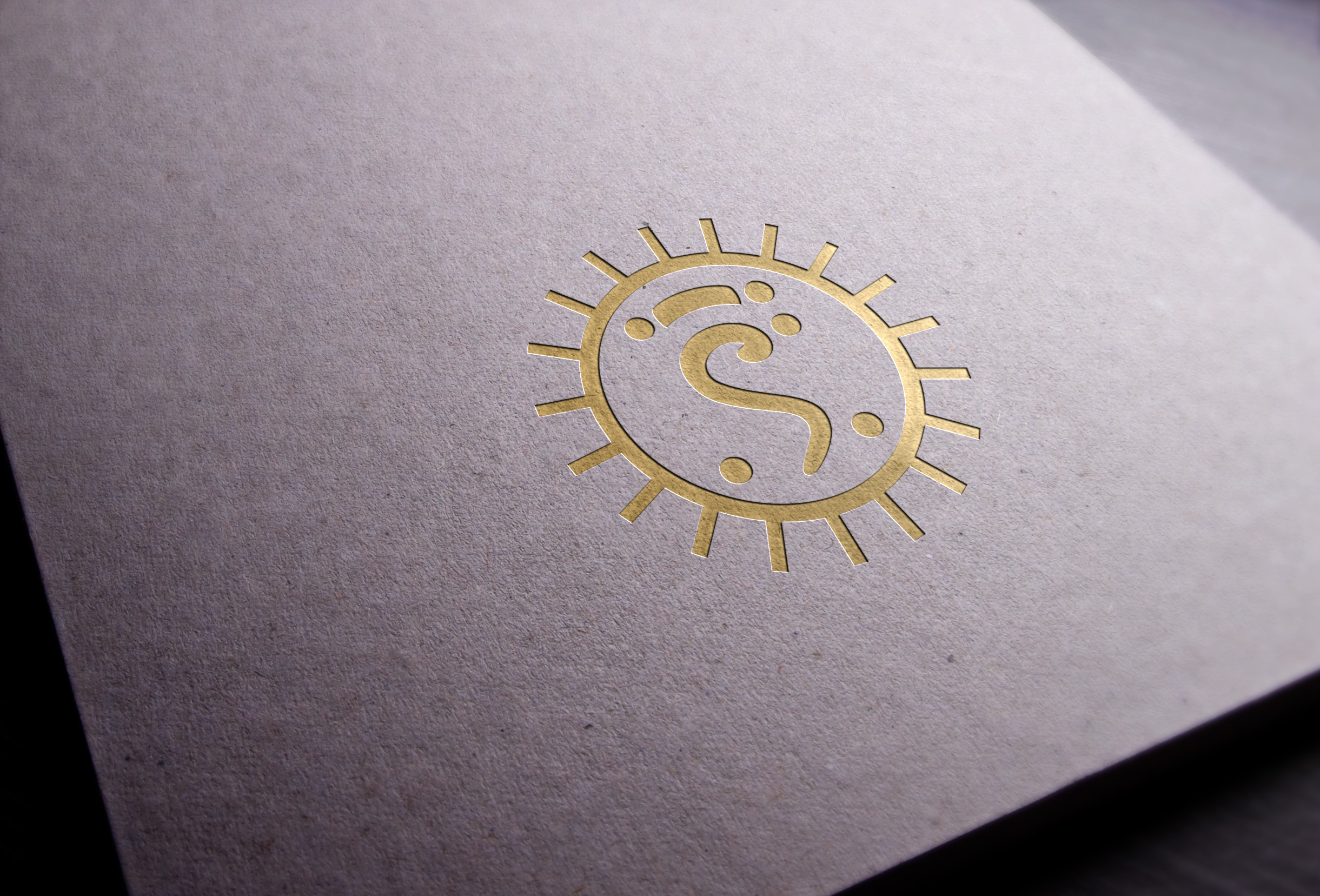
The religious symbol for Sanamahi religion is given in the Wakoklon Heelel Thilel Salai Amailon Pukok Puya text.

Sanamahism teaches that religion originates from hidden scientific knowledge intended to preserve life. Rituals reflect the philosophy of the Meitei people:

- Pokpa: birth rites
- Luhongba: marriage rites
- Korou Nongaba: death rites

These ceremonies shows the sanctity of life, the role of blood, and the responsibility of humans to protect the planet.

== Revival ==
The collective effort of the revival of Sanamahism is often referred to as the Sanamahi movement. The earliest accounts can be traced back to the formation of the Apokpa Marup by Laininghal Naoriya Phulo in 1930 at Cachar (present day Assam, India). The movement spread to the Manipur Valley by 1934. Although the movement did not gain momentum due to the Japanese invasion in the Second World War, plans were initially made to intensify the movement under the leadership of Takhellambam Bokul (Sanamahi Bokul). Phulo died in 1941.

Three years after the death of Phulo in 1944, the movement finally started gaining momentum in Manipur. Resolutions were made to denounce Hinduism and to revive Sanamahism in Manipur. Mass campaign were held to popularise Sanamahi religion at various places in Manipur. On 14 May 1945, the popular Meitei Marup movement was formed. This marked the beginning of the revival of Sanamahism and the Meitei Mayek, original script of the Manipuri Language among other things. The term Sanamahism and Meitei Marup are often used interchangeably. The Brahma Sabha strongly opposed the movement and formally outcast 38 members of Meitei Marup.

By the 1970s and 1980s, the Sanamahi Movement attracted more activists. Massive drives were held reclaiming shrines of deiteis and adverting Hindu practices or worship to ancient old traditions of Sanamahism. Notable movement was the seizure of the idols of Sanamahi and Leimarel Sidabi from Hindu Brahmins, which are now presently installed in the temple at First Manipur Rifles Ground, Imphal. On 16 February 1974, a mass conversion to Sanamahism was held. The event became known as, Nongkhang Parei Hanba, which symbolized reversing the forced mass baptism into Hinduism of the Meitei people of Manipur by King Pamheiba in 1729, which is referred to as Nongkhang Iruppa.

On 23 April 1992, the then Maharaja of Manipur, Okendrajit Sana declared that "I open the Lubak Tabu and abandon Hinduism as state religion and recognition is hereby withdrawn by the Royal Customary Law of the Country, instead the Royal Customary Law revives the Lainingthouism as the state religion and do herby give recognition as state religion."

The 2011 census of India estimated the Sanamahism followers to be around 8.19% of the total population of Manipur, India.

== Official status ==
On 5 August 2022, the Manipur State Legislative Assembly re-affirmed a resolution to record the Sanamahi religion in the census data with a separate unique code as an officially recognised minority religion of India. In the past, on 31 July 2002 and on 1 August 2003, the Manipur State Legislative Assembly had adopted similar resolutions to allot a unique code for the religion but did not get approved by the Central Government of India.

In the previous decades, many social, religious and political activists, associations and organisations struggled through violent agitations and protests to include the Sanamahi religion as an officially recognised minority religion of India.

== Practices ==
Many Sanamahi practices are focused on food offerings to deities, combined with hymns, as well as oracular ritual in which priestesses become possessed by a god or goddess. An offering formula to call up the gods, uttered by a priestess over a body of water during the Lai Haraoba festival, goes:

Incarnate Lord, Lairen (Lai- God, Len- Supreme) Deity Pakhangba, O golden one,
Goddess of the waters, Ruler of the rivers:
Golden Goddess (Laisana) fair and beautiful one:
For you, Lord and Lady, in order to call up your souls,
We have poured the rice on the finest of banana leaves,
And on it have placed the fertile egg and the langthrei buds.
We do not offer you the ordinary khayom (offering packet), we offer you your own khayoms,
And we have tied them with the seven bamboo strips.
Which (represent) the seven days of the week.
We offer you the khayoms as they are tied thus.
Lord and Lady, we beseech you,
Ascend from within the khayoms, riding along the hiris.

Some esoteric practices are also a part of Sanamahism, such as the use of mantras for various purposes. The mystical text Sanamahi Naiyom provides several formulas, such as a mantra that is believed to stop rain.

== Religious festivals ==
- Sanamahi Ahong Khong Chingba
- Lai Haraoba
- Mera Hou Chongba
- Mera Chaorel Houba
- Kwaak Taanba
- Yaoshang
- Panthoibi Iratpa
- Imoinu Iratpa
- Sajibu Cheiraoba
- Heikru Hidongba

== Demographics ==
Historical population
Year	Pop.	±%
1981	1,538	—
1991		—
2001	223,742	—
2011	222,422	−0.6%

According to the 2011 census of India, 222,422 people in India follow Sanamahism. The vast majority of them (222,315 people) are in the state of Manipur. Sanamahism followers make up 14.6 percent of all the Meitei people. Others that profess to follow Hinduism also follow many religious traditions and rituals of Sanamahism. For example, they worship Sanamahi in the south-west corners of their homes.

== Associations and organisations ==
- International Sanamahism Students' Association
- Lainingthou Sanamahi Sanapung
- Lainingthou Sanamahi Temple Board
- South East Asia Cultural Organisation

== Sources ==
- Otojit Kshetrimayum (2009), "Women and Shamanism in Manipur and Korea: A Comparative Study", Indian Anthropologist, 39 (1/2): 17–34, ISSN 0970-0927, JSTOR 41920088
- Kshetrimayum, Otojit (2014), Ritual, Politics and Power in North East India: Contextualising the Lai Haraoba of Manipur, Ruby Press & Co., ISBN 978-93-82395-50-8
- Hodson, T.C. (2015), The Meitheis, Ruby Press & Co., ISBN 978-93-82395-56-0
- Saroj Nalini Parratt (1974), The Religion of Manipur: Beliefs, Rituals and Historical Development, Australian National University Press
- Saroj N. Arambam Parratt; John Parratt (2001), "The Second 'Women's War' and the Emergence of Democratic Government in Manipur", Modern Asian Studies, 35 (4): 905–919, doi:10.1017/S0026749X0100405X, JSTOR 313195, S2CID 145449486
- Sohini Ray (2009), "Writing the Body: Cosmology, Orthography, and Fragments of Modernity in Northeastern India", Anthropological Quarterly, 82 (1): 129–154, doi:10.1353/anq.0.0047, JSTOR 25488260, S2CID 140755509
- Singh, Dr. Saikhom Gopal (2015), The Meeteis of Manipur: A Study in Human Geography, Ruby Press & Co., ISBN 978-93-82395-21-8
- Singh, Dr. Saikhom Gopal (2015), Population Geography of Manipur, Ruby Press & Co., ISBN 978-93-82395-25-6
