= Sanamahi Temple =

Temple of Lord Sanamahi in India

Religion
- Affiliation: Sanamahism
- District: Imphal West District
- Deity: Lainingthou Sanamahi
- Festivals: Sajibu Nongma Panba, Mera Hou Chongba and Sanamahi Ahong Khong Chingba
- Governing body: Lainingthou Sanamahi Temple Board

Location
- Location: First Manipur Rifles Ground, Sanakhwa Yaima Kollup
- State: Manipur
- Country: India

Architecture
- Creator: Kulachandra
- Established: 1891AD
- Completed: 1891 AD

Specifications
- Temple: 1
- Monument: 1

Sanamahi Temple (Meitei: ꯁꯅꯥꯃꯍꯤ ꯂꯥꯢꯁꯪ) or Sanamahi Sanglen (Meitei: ꯁꯅꯥꯃꯍꯤ ꯁꯪꯂꯦꯟ) is a temple of Lainingthou Sanamahi, the supreme deity of Sanamahism. It is located in the Sanakhwa Yaima Kollup near Kangla Palace in Imphal West district of Manipur, India. It is one of the oldest temples in Asia. However, it is often confused with the Sanamahi Kiyong Temple, situated in the hilltop of the Nongmaiching Hill of Imphal East district of Manipur. It is one of the largest Kanglei temples in the state.

== Construction ==
It was reconstructed during the reign of king Kulachandra Singh of Manipur (princely state) in 1891 AD. It is one of the oldest temples in Asia. It is built in a Gothic style for the roof. In its southern side, there is a flying advance. The structure is raised in an octagonal base. It is currently located in the 1st Manipur Rifles Ground at Imphal West district of Manipur.

== See also ==
- Hiyangthang Lairembi Temple
