= Imoinu Iratpa =

Religious festival of Manipuri Goddess Imoinu

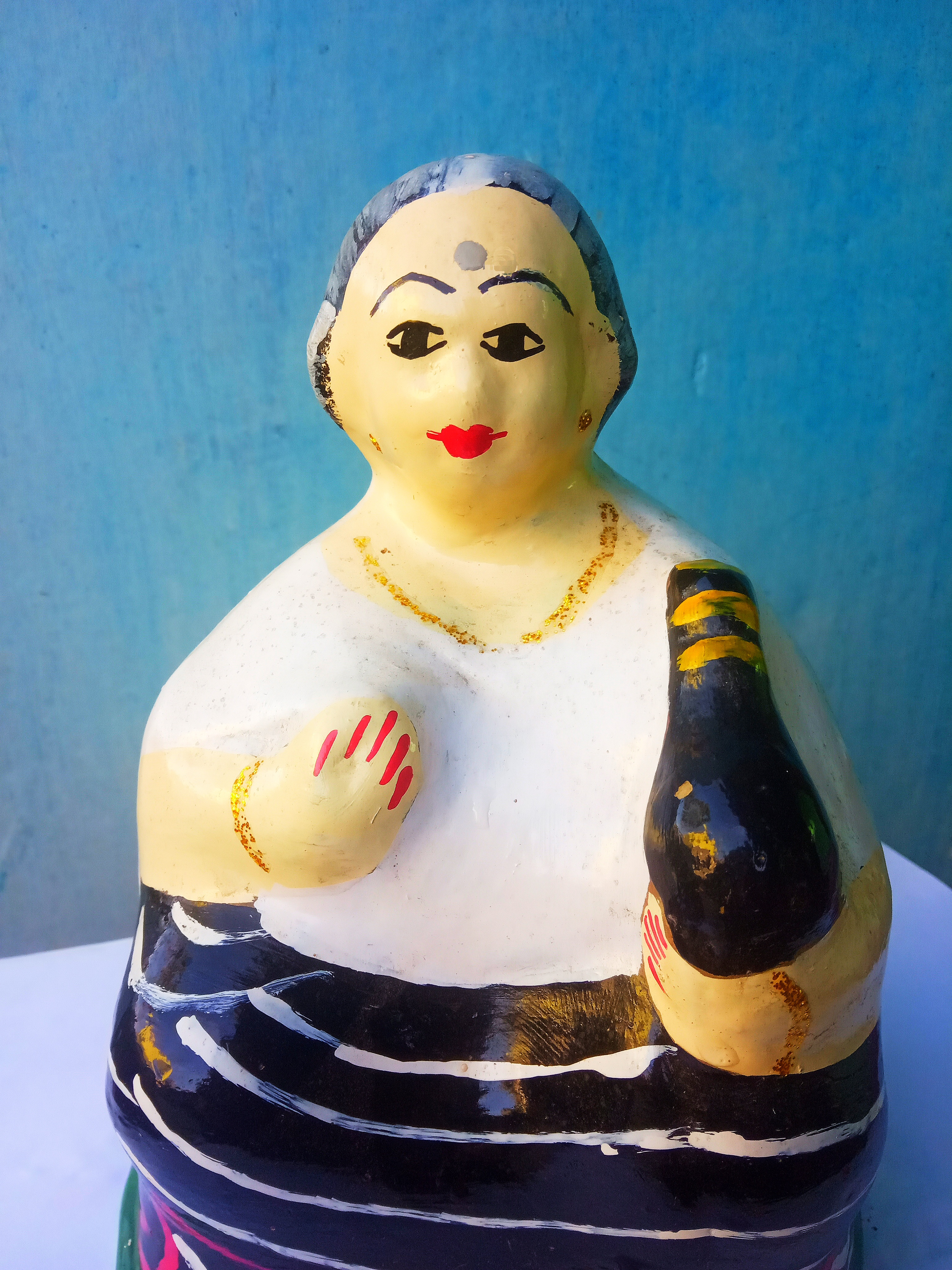
- Imoinu Ahongbi, goddess of wealth
- Observed by: Meitei people
- Type: Religious
- Celebrations: Lights being lit up at every households
- Observances: Prayers
- Date: 12th lunar day of Wakching month of Meitei calendar
- Frequency: Annual

Imoinu Iratpa or Emoinu Iratpa or Wakching Taranithoini Pānba is a religious festival celebrated by the Meitei people. It is a festival of lights dedicated to the goddess of wealth and prosperity, Imoinu Ahongbi. The festival is celebrated on the twelfth lunar day of Wakching month of Meitei calendar. The festival is celebrated in Manipur, Assam and Tripura states in North Eastern India and observed by some in the neighboring Myanmar. The festival involves sacrifices and prayers to the goddess, followed by various other cultural events.

== Etymology ==
Iratpa means "sacrifice" and Imoinu Iratapa translates to "sacrifice to the goddess Imoinu" in Meitei language. The festival is also known as Wakching Taranithoini Paanba, which translates to the "twelfth day of Wakching" (Taranithoini meaning "twelfth day" and Panba meaning "to be"), referring to the day on which the festival is celebrated.

== Background ==
The festival is dedicated to mother goddess Imoinu Ahongbi. Goddess Imoinu or Emoinu is considered as the goddess of wealth and prosperity, peace, wisdom, vitality and resources. Imoinu is believed to be an incarnation of Leimarel Sidabi, wife of Supreme God Sidaba. Leimarel Sidabi is the first woman and she created the second Leimarel, who was to take care of the human beings on earth, who was named as Imoinu Ahongbi. According to a Meitei mythology, goddess Emoinu visits earth every year on the day and visits every home to shower her blessings. According to Meitei history, the worship of Emoinu began in the fifth century CE when the royal family worshiped the goddess and later by the 15th century CE, the common people also began to worship her.

== Occurrence ==
Imoinu Iratapa is celebrated on the 12th of lunar day of the Wakching month of the Meitei calendar. It usually falls on the month of December-January in the Gregorian calendar.

== Observance ==
Imoinu Iratapa is a festival of lights, celebrated by the Meitei people following the traditional religion Sanamahism. The festival is also observed by Meitei people, who follow other religions such as Hinduism. The festival is celebrated in Manipur, Assam and Tripura states in North Eastern India. It is also observed by some of the people settled in the neighboring Myanmar. It is a public holiday in Manipur.

== Practices ==
During the festival, people offer rice, vegetables, fruits and sweets to the goddess Imoinu. At night time, people light candles and other decorated lights are put up in the streets. A good meal with fish curry as the main dish is offered to the deity at the funga lairu, the traditional fire place in the kitchen. Apart from worship at individual homes, various rituals are also organized at the community level. The day is marked through prayers to the goddess, followed by various other cultural events. It also features a religious procession the night before the formal prayers. The procession is led by Maibas and Maibis, wherein the idol of goddess Imoinu is taken to Meitei households amongst song and music.

The people perform music from the traditional musical instrument pena and traditional dances like Khamba Thoibi and Maibi Jagoi. Tales about the goddess Imoinu are told and songs are sung invoking the deity. Traditional martial art performance of Thang-Ta using a sword (Thang) and a spear (Ta) is also performed.

Since 2022, a fish fair or fish festival is being organized as a part of the festival, in the days leading up the main festival day. The Emoinu fish festival is conducted to procure the necessary fish for the festival and encourage aquaculture.
