= List of creatures in Meitei culture =

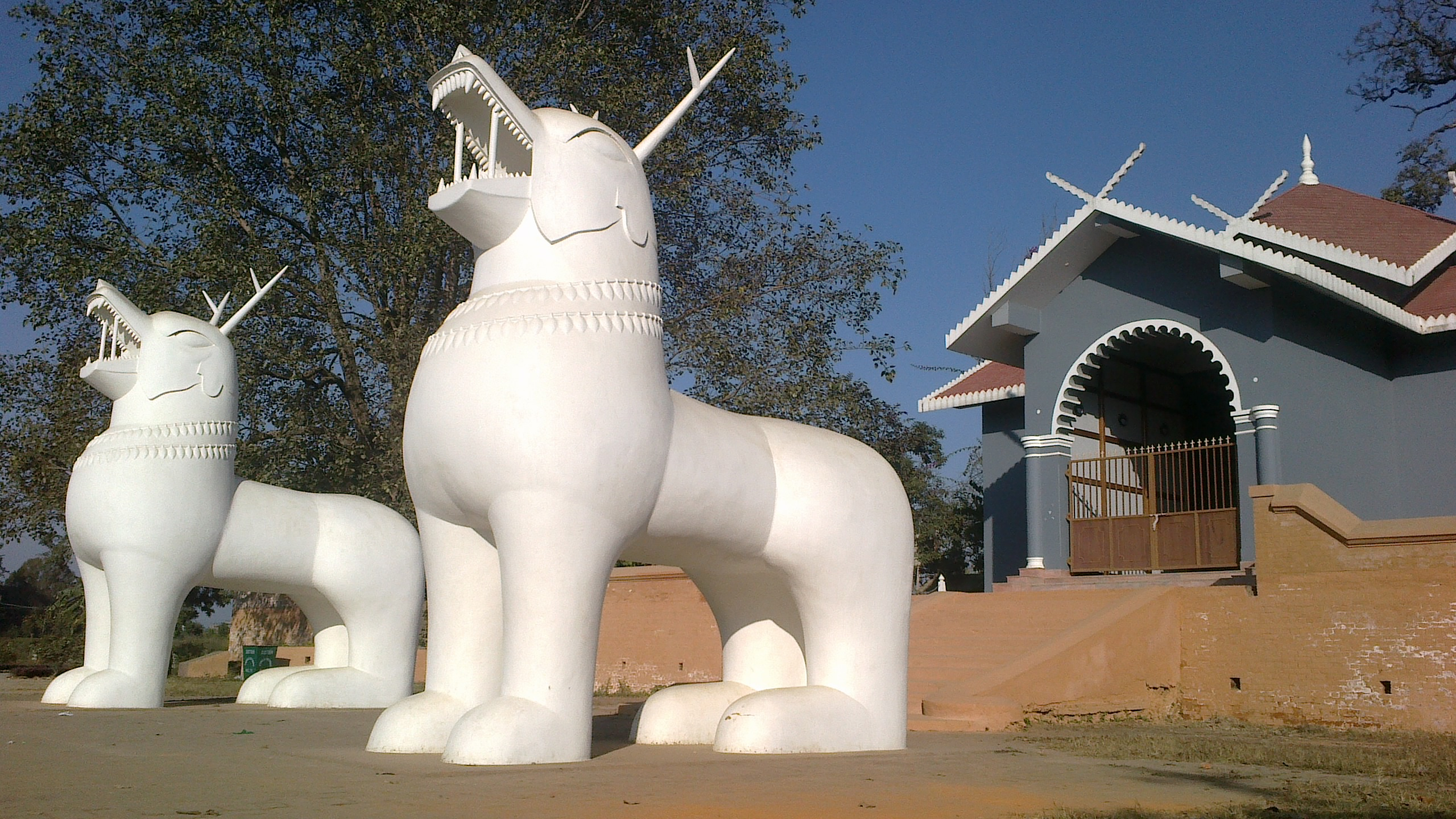
Kanglasha, a pair of dragons at Kangla

Meitei people, being the predominant ethnic group in the Himalayan kingdom of Manipur, has diverse cultural contacts with diverse communities of other nations since ancient times. The case is the same with Meitei folklore as well as Meitei culture. This is a list of the creatures of Ancient Meetei folklore. This doesn't include the list of deities in Meitei mythology, for which see Lists of deities in Sanamahism and Meitei deities.

== Mythological Animals ==
Creatures	Description
Chareng, also known as Uchek Langmeidong	A human girl who later turns out into a hornbill bird.
Kakyen (Kwak Kakyen Mingamba)	A monster bird, with its wingspan equivalent to the size of a pologround.
Kao (bull)	The supernatural sacred bull of enormous strength who attacked the fishers in the shores of the Loktak lake and dwells among the wild reeds of the Phumdis. It's later captured by Khuman Khamba, a legendary hero and a son of its former master.
Samadon Ayangba (Shamadon Ayangba)	The flying winged horse who serves Marjing as his stead.

== Dragons ==
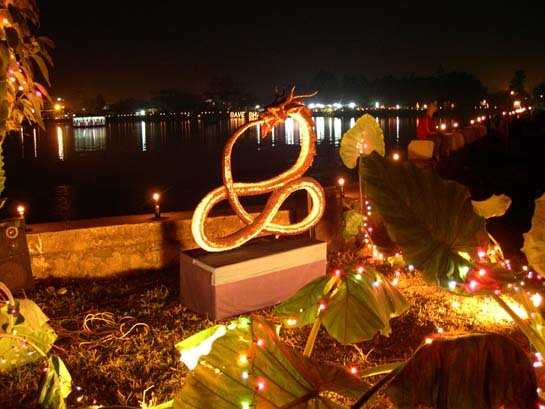
Pakhangba

Creatures	Description
Hiyang Hiren	The giant dragon boat creature which used to carry the gods on its deck.
Nongshaba, also known as Kangla Sha	The dragon lion son of Salailen Sidaba and deity of royalty.
Pakhangba	The serpentine dragon who is the destroyer of evil.
Poubi Lai	The serpentine dragon who dwells in the Loktak Lake, believed to be an incarnation of Pakhangba.

== Evil Creatures ==
Creatures	Description	Type
Seroi Ngaroi	Believed to be evil beings who feed on human flesh as well as animal meat.	Evils
Tamnalai	Believed to be ghosts and souls who often haunt human beings.	Evils
