= Kwaak Taanba =

Festival of Manipur

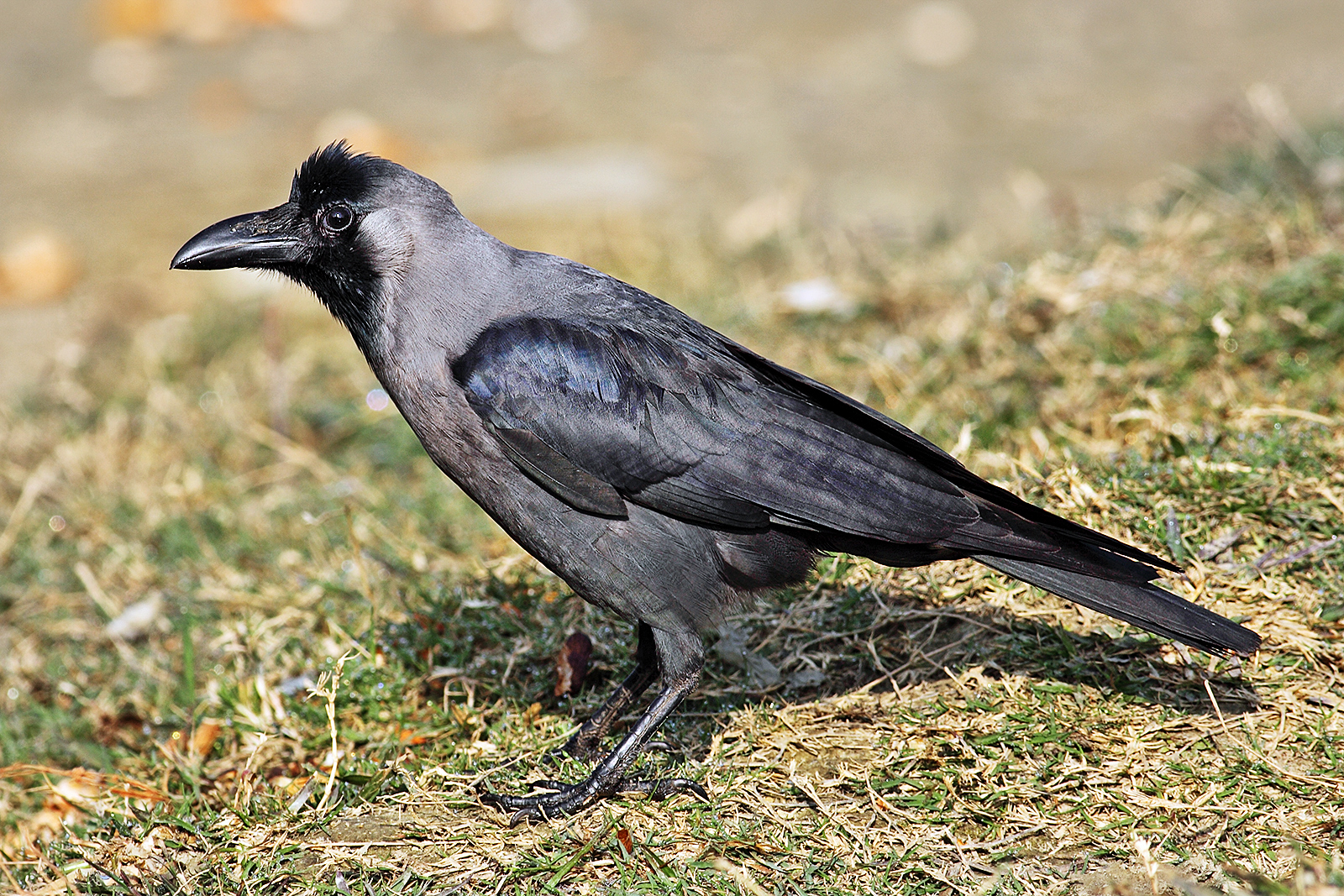
Kwaak or the crow is set free in the festival by the King of Manipur

Kwaak Taanba or Kwaak Jatra or Loidam Kumsaba or Crow freeing festival is an indigenous festival of Manipur, in which the King of Manipur releases a crow from his custody. The day falls on the 10th lunar day of Mera month of the Meitei calendar. The festival accompanies several rites and rituals, along with various divine dance and music performances held at the Sana Konung, the Royal Palace of Manipur at Imphal.

The setting free of the crow is performed at the Thangapat, the Royal Moat, in Imphal. The main purpose of the festival is to bring prosperity and good luck in the region. It has been performed since time immemorial.

== Earlier form ==
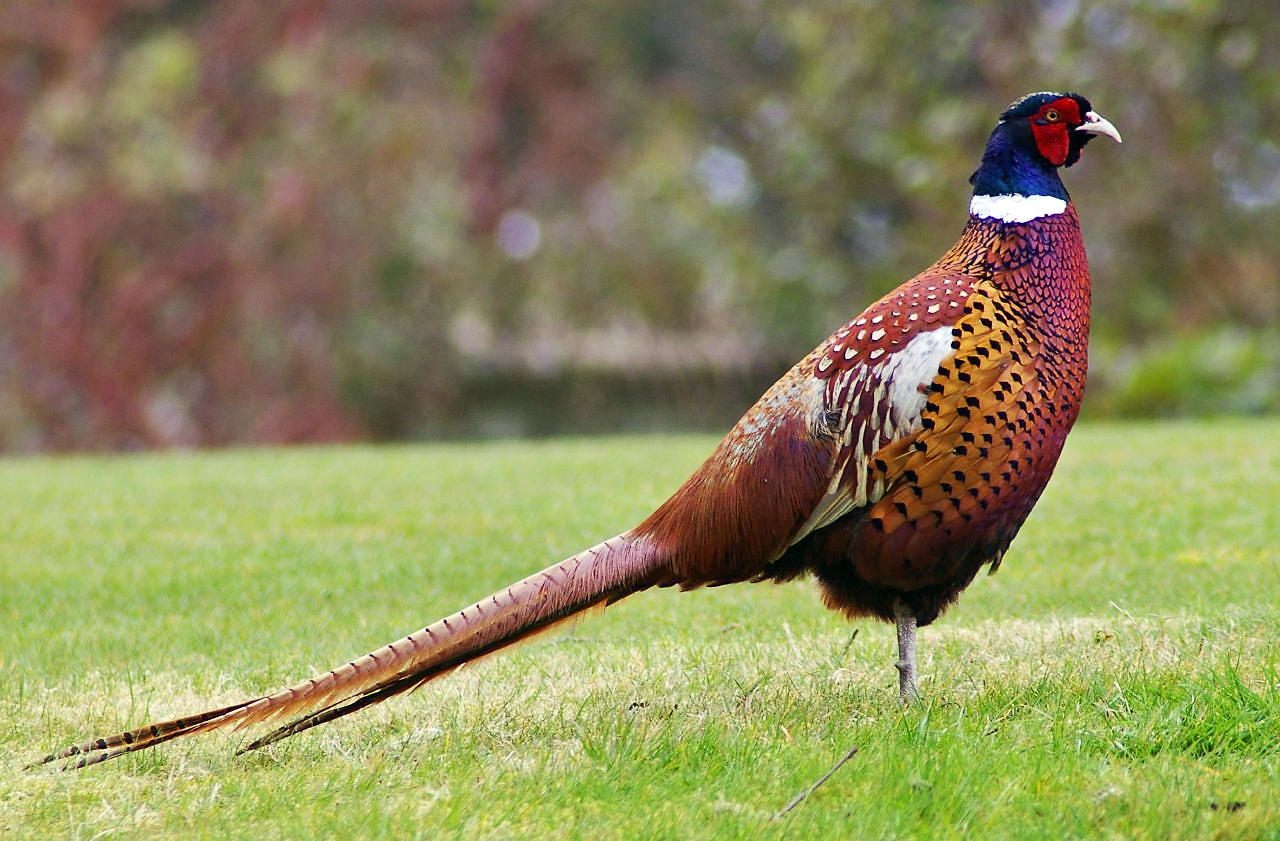
Pheasant or Nonggoubi is set free in the festival

Earlier, the festival was known as Loidam Kumsaba and instead of a crow, a pheasant (locally called Nonggoubi) was used for the festival.
