= Heikru Hidongba =

Manipuri boat racing festival

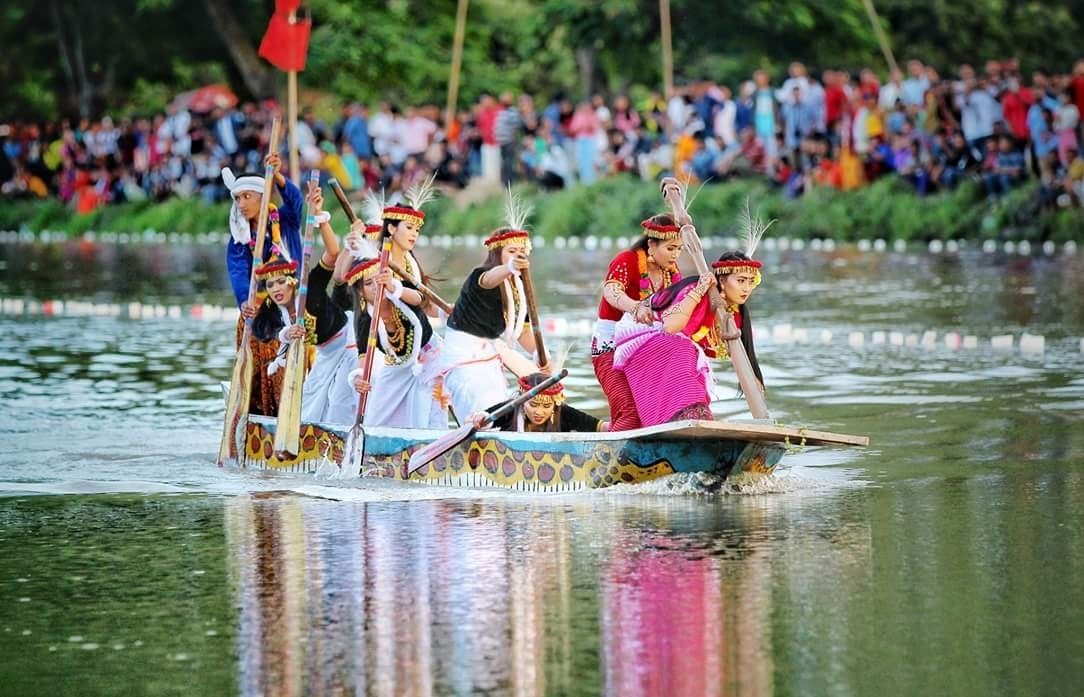
- Ladies participating in Heikru Hidongba
- Observed by: Meitei people
- Type: Meitei
- Celebrations: Boat racing
- Date: as per Meitei calendar
- Frequency: Annual

"Heikru Hidongba" (Manipuri boat racing festival) is a socio-religious ceremony performed every year at the moat of the Sagolband Bijoy Govinda Leikai, Imphal on the 11th day of the Meitei calendar month Langban (coinciding with September) with elements of religious, custom and other traditional belief of creation.

== History ==
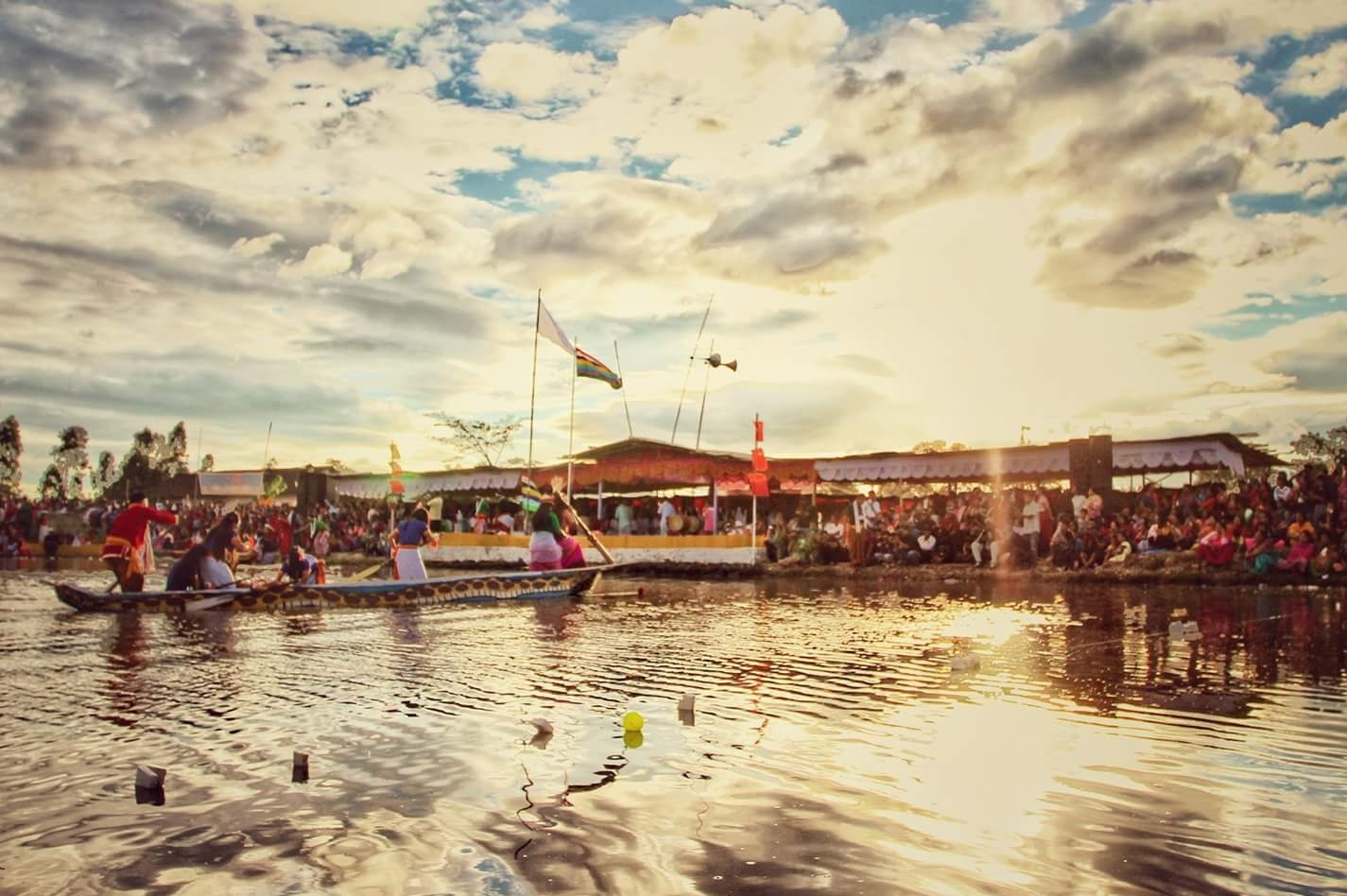
A scene of Heikru Hidongba being performed.

"Heikru Hidongba" is one of the several socio-religious ceremony performed to bring peace and prosperity to the community which was started during the reign of Maharaja Irengba in 984 A.D. With the passage of time and through the reign of several kings, many changes took places in the religious life of the Meiteis. The culmination was attained during the time of Maharaja Bhagychandra. During this time Meidingu Nongpok Leirikhomba (Anantashai) uncle to the King Bhagychandra tried hard to preserve the tradition and to effect an adjustment between the old and the new.

In 1779, Heikru Hidongba was performed at the moat of Bijoy Govinda with the Shri Shri Bijoy Govindaji from the royal palace coming with customary rites and rituals after the completion of which it was installed in the new temple dedicated by Nongpok Leirikhomba at Sagolband Bijoy Govinda Leikai. In the next year it was decided subsequently to have the Heikru Hidongba festival every year on the 11th day of the month of Langban in Manipuri Calendar.

There is a historical background to the moat. It was once known as "Tubi Irel". Once Meidingu Nongpok Leirikhomba was in the jail of the King of Moirang, in fetters from where he was freed by the plans of the daughter of Khelei Nungnang Telheiba. Too happy at that, the moat was named Moirang Leima Thangapat, the moat of the Moirang Leima by which name it was also known.

== Proceedings of the Heikru Hidongba ==
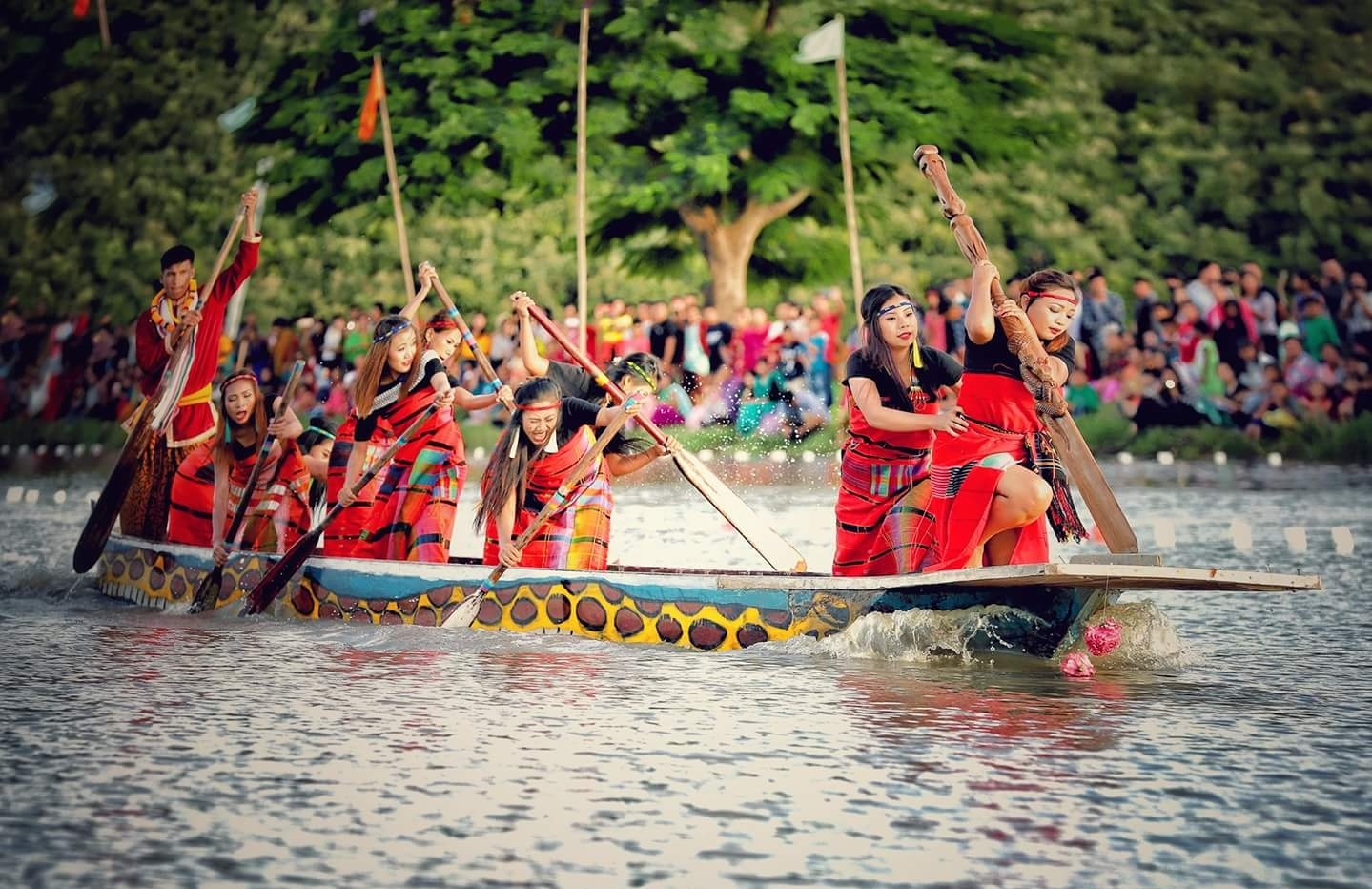
Tribal ladies participating in the festival

In a twin boat sanctified by the presence of the deity amidst chanting of Sankirtana and music, Arti is offered. Tengmaileppa (who takes care of the boat), Hinao Shaba (who steers the boat), Chang Shaba (who look after the Tengmaileppa), Nourungba (who takes care of leakage of water inside the boat, etc.) and Naomang Shaba (who helps the one who steers the boat) are the main participants of the race who will put on Ningkham and Shamjim, traditional components of the formal dress of such festivities. Some more ornament are also there. Along with this the King will be present along with the Vishnu. If the King could not be present, in that case Vishnu will occupy the seat where the traditional royal seat is laid out. In keeping with customary traditional, one day before the festival of Heikru Hidongba the Kingand the Vishnu are offered ritual invitation. In the evening boat race practise is done. The leaders of the race boat (Tengmaileppa), in the early morning of the Heikru Hidongba festival (early morning between 10th and 11th of Langban Month in Manipuri Calendar) flakes of silver and gold put in anganthak tengnou shaba (well shaped earthen receptacle to put traditional smoke flakes) will be offered to Bijoy Govinda. A garland of 108 heikru (Amla) interspersed with the stem of Hup (a wild grass) and another garland of 108 rice which the peeling is done by hand will be first offered to Bijoy Govinda and afterwards placed at the hull of the boat. Before the boat race starts Bijoy Govinda will have a pleasure of the panoramic scene. The two leaders of the boat (Tengmaileppa) after due offerings to God will start the race.

== Heikru Hidongba and Hiyang Tannaba ==
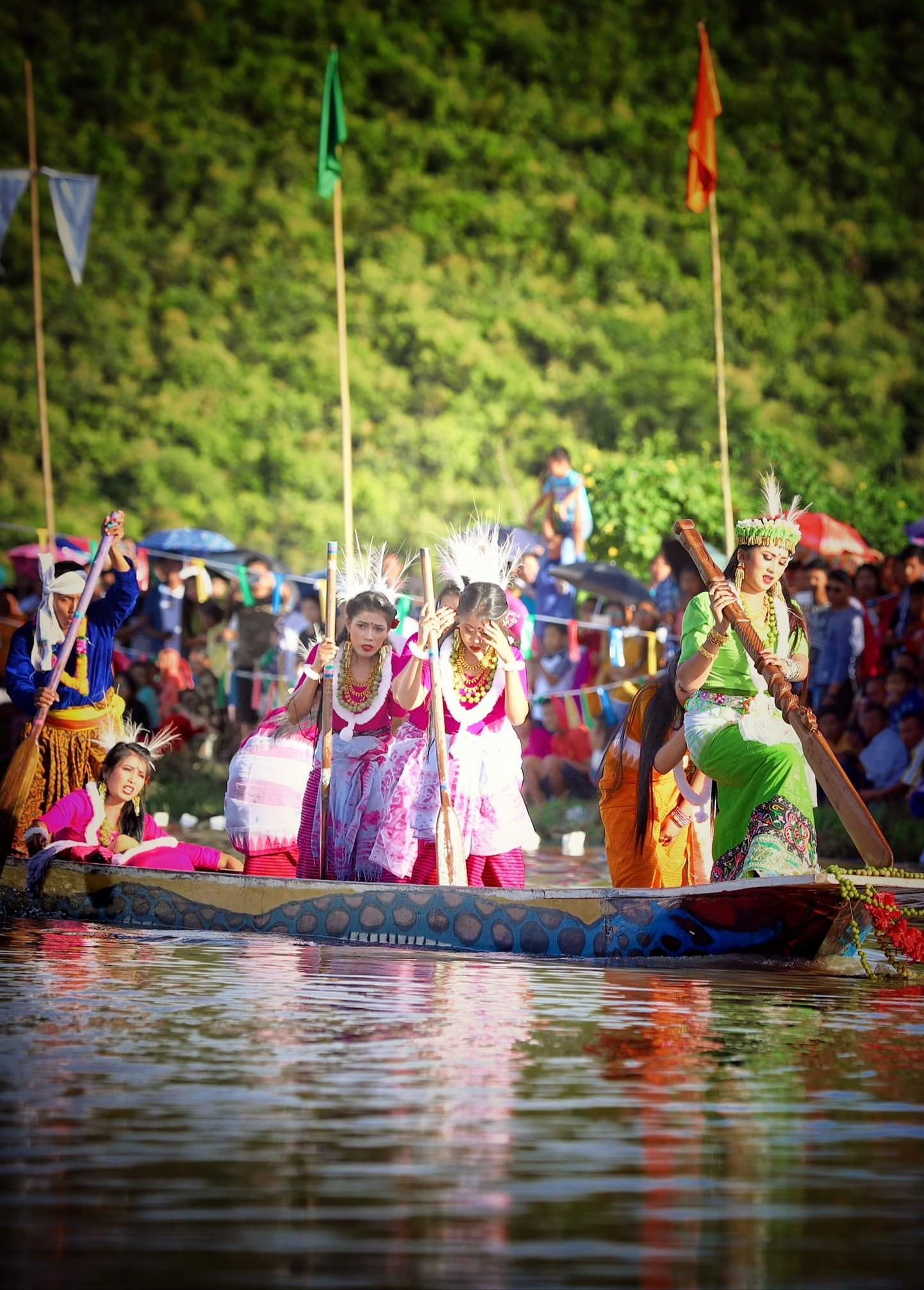
Ladies participating in the festival

Even though the two appear to be festivity of similar nature, there are many differences between the two. As Heikru Hidongba is performed with necessary rituals on the appointed day enjoined by the religious and customary sanctions it necessarily point to the difference between the two. Heikru Hidongba is combination of the three words, namely Heirku+ Hi+Tongba to complete the word Heikru Hidongba. And it is not performed at any other place than at the moat of Bijoy Govinda.

== See also ==
- Fairs and Festivals in Manipur

== Source ==
- Heikru Hidongba published by Bijoy Govinda Sevayet Committee, Imphal
