= Lainingthou Sanamahi =

Meetei God

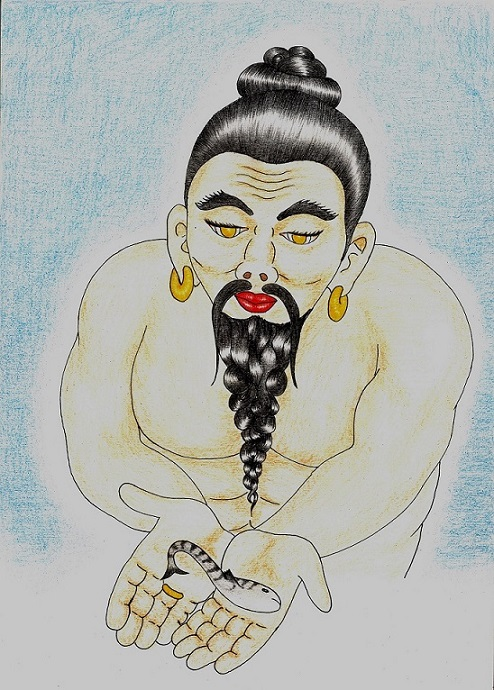
Sanamahi creating ngamu during the primordial era

Lainingthou Sanamahee (Meetei: ꯂꯥꯏꯅꯤꯡꯊꯧ ꯁꯅꯥꯃꯍꯤ) is the Supreme Guardian God of mankind and the supreme deity of the household in Meetei religion and mythology. He originated from the ancient kingdom of Kangleipak (Manipur). He is regarded as the most popular and significant divinity of Sanamahism. He is the brother of Pakhangba and Nongshaba. He is the eldest son of Creator God Saalailel Sitapa and Leimalel Sitapee, the protector of the Universe in Meetei mythology and philosophy and Mother Earth goddess Leimarel Sidabi.

== Etymology ==
The term Lainingthou is derived from Meetei language which means "King of Gods" and the term Sanamahi is combination of "Sanna" which means spreading and "Eemahi" which means "blood that originates living", literally means "spreading everywhere (like liquid)".

== Mythology ==
When Sanamahi was ordered to cross the globe seven times by his father, he at once proceeded. However, his younger brother Pakhangba as per the instruction of his mother Leimarel Sidabi, went around his father Atingkok Maru Sidaba seven times, which is equivalent to the globe.

As per the declaration that among the two brothers, the first to succeed in traveling across the globe seven times, would be offered his father's throne of the Universe. That's how Pakhangba got the throne. However, in order to compensate Sanamahi, Atingkok Maru Sidaba offered him to be the king of every household of Mankind in the universe.

== Divine names ==
There are one thousand divine names of the God Lainingthou Sanamahi.

== Religious sites ==
The sacred places of Lainingthou Sanamahi include Sanamahi Temple, Kangla Palace, and Sanamahi Kiyong Temple.

== Texts ==
Ancient texts that discuss him include:

- Sanamahi Laihui
- Karthong Lamlen
- Wakoklon Heelel Thilen Salai Amailon Pukok Puya (written in 1400 BC)
- Hijan-Hirao
- Besides the above-mentioned sacred books, there are several sacred books or Puya (Meitei texts) discovered from various hidings.

== Festivals ==
The religious festivals associated with Lord Sanamahi are:

- Sanamahi Ahong Khong Chingba
- Mera Hou Chongba
- Lai Haraoba
- Sajibu Cheiraoba

== See also ==
- Awang Phatlou Laimakhomba
- Lists of creatures in Meitei folklore
- Lists of deities in Sanamahism
- Sanamahi creation myth
