= Sanamahi Ahong Khong Chingba =

Festival of Manipur

- Observed by: Meitei people
- Type: religious
- Celebrations: Rice, vegetables and fruits are offered to the deity Lainingthou Sanamahi
- Observances: Grand Chariot housing deity Sanamahi is pulled by the devotees
- Date: ancient period to the 18th century; 2018-present
- Frequency: Annual

Sanamahi Ahong Khong Chingba or Sanamahi Cheng Hongba or Kang Chingba is the religious festival of Meitei people, associated mainly with the public procession with the grand chariot, housing the ancient Meitei deity Lainingthou Sanamahi. The Imphal city serves as the main location of the festival. It attracts thousands of pilgrims who join the procession. The festival was celebrated 350 years ago, and after a long pause, it was first recelebrated in the year 2018.

During the festival, thousands of devotees offer rice, fruits, vegetables, money, along with the traditional rites and rituals to seek blessings from the deity.

== Similar festival ==
Sanamahi Ahong Khong Chingba is purely a festival of Sanamahism. But after Hindunisation of Meitei society, a similar type of festival was created.
