= Sajibu Nongma Panba =

Lunar new tear festival of the Meitei people of India

Sajibu Nongma Paanba
- Also called: Meitei Cheiraoba, Meetei Cheiraoba
- Observed by: Meitei people
- Type: Asian
- Celebrations: 1 day
- Begins: 1st day of the Month of Sajibu
- Date: March (generally), April (occasionally)
- Frequency: Annual

Sajibu Nongma Pānba (Meitei for 'First day of Sajibu month'), also called Meitei Cheiraoba (Meitei for 'Meitei New Year') or Sajibu Cheiraoba (Meitei for 'Sajibu New Year'), is the lunar new year festival of the Meitei people who follow Sanamahism (traditional Meitei religion), celebrated predominantly in the Indian state of Manipur. The name Sajibu Nongma Pānba derives from the Manipuri words: Sajibu - the first month of the year which usually falls during the month of April according to Meitei lunar calendar, Nongma - first date of a Month, Pānba - to be. Literally, it means the first day of the month of Sajibu. It is also celebrated by the Indian diasporas in western countries, including but not limited to Canada and Australia. Similarly, it is also celebrated in many Indian cities outside Manipur, like in Bangalore, Guwahati, Kolkata, Mumbai, Pune, among many others.

However, according to the follower of the faith of Sanamahism, Meitei New Year/Sajibu Nongma Panba started during the reign of King Maliya Fambalcha (1359 BC-1329 BC) also known as Koi-Koi. Koikoi ascended the throne at the age of 25 years. From this day, the dating of Meitei calendar (Cheiraoba) known as Mari-Fam was introduced. Hence, 1359 BC will be 25 MF, and 2000 AD will be 3334 MF in Meitei calendar taking the birthday of KOIKOI as 00 MF. King Koikoi reigned till 1364 MF according to the Meitei calendar (the Meitei calendar is still unclear and unpublished though).↵Not to forget, Koi-Koi ascended the throne from King (Ningthou in Meitei) Kangba (1405-1359 BC).

== Observance of the festival ==
First Offering ritual: The Meitei people celebrates the festival with great fanfare; gatherings of the extended family and a sumptuous feast for lunch are 'de rigueur'. The day, begins with ritual offerings of fruits, vegetables, rice and other uncooked food items to the Meitei deity Lainingthou Sanamahi during the early morning of the festival.

The preparation of the feast: After getting blessings from Lainingthou Sanamahi, odd number of dishes ( basically 3, 5, 7 or 9 are prepared) are prepared using the offerings. Traditionally, the men of the house makes the dishes, with the women helping in chopping and washing the ingredients.

Second Offering ritual: After the dishes for the feast are made, they are ritually offered at two different traditional locations around the house: one at the front gate of the house and the other at the rear gate of the house. These locations are specially cleansed and sanctified before the offering by cleaning an area (around 2x2 feet) and decorating it with mud, flowers and leaves. Traditionally, the eldest son of the house will make the offering to these three deities - Kumsana Kumliklai (Lord of the golden year), Lamsenba Tusenba (Guardian of the Land) and Lammaba Tumaba (Lord of the land) at this sanctified area. The offering traditionally includes: an odd number (chang taaba) of dishes surrounding a small mound of steamed rice, a token currency, fruits, flowers, a candle, and an incense stick, all of them placed upon a plantain leaf. This ritual is performed in the late morning.

Feast: After this ritual, the dishes prepared for the feast are exchange with relatives/neighbours and this custom is called "Mathel Laanba" after which the feast will start. It is believed that on the day of new year anything that happens on that day will happen for the rest of the year i.e. if you are happy and healthy on that day, you will be happy and healthy for the rest of the year.

Ching Kāba: Hillock Climbing: After the feast, it is tradition that family members climb a small hillock specially prepared by the community near the locality to pay homage to the hill deity, signifying the elevation of the spirit to reach the divine. The "Chin-nga" at Singjamei and "Cheirao Ching" at Chingmeirong are such hillocks that are specially prepared for these hillock climbing ritual. Toy shops, eateries, and other varied small shops will line the road to the hillock on that day to attract the ritual climbers to buy their items. The Ching Kāba is usually done during the afternoon to early evening, before the sun sets.

== Traditional activities performed prior to the festival ==
Spring cleaning activities will be seen in all the families of the Meitei people prior to the festival. They will clean all things, including clothes, utensils, all household items, unused items around the house, etc. It is also traditional to buy new clothes to wear on the new year.
