= Konthoujam (disambiguation) =

Konthoujam may refer to:

- Konthoujam, a Meitei ethnic family name
- Konthoujam Tampha Lairembi, a Meitei goddess
  - Konthoujam Lairembi Stone Inscription, a stone inscription in the sacred place of the goddess
- Konthoujam Assembly constituency, a Legislative Assembly constituency in Manipur State, India
