= Meitei traditional toys =

Toys in Meitei culture

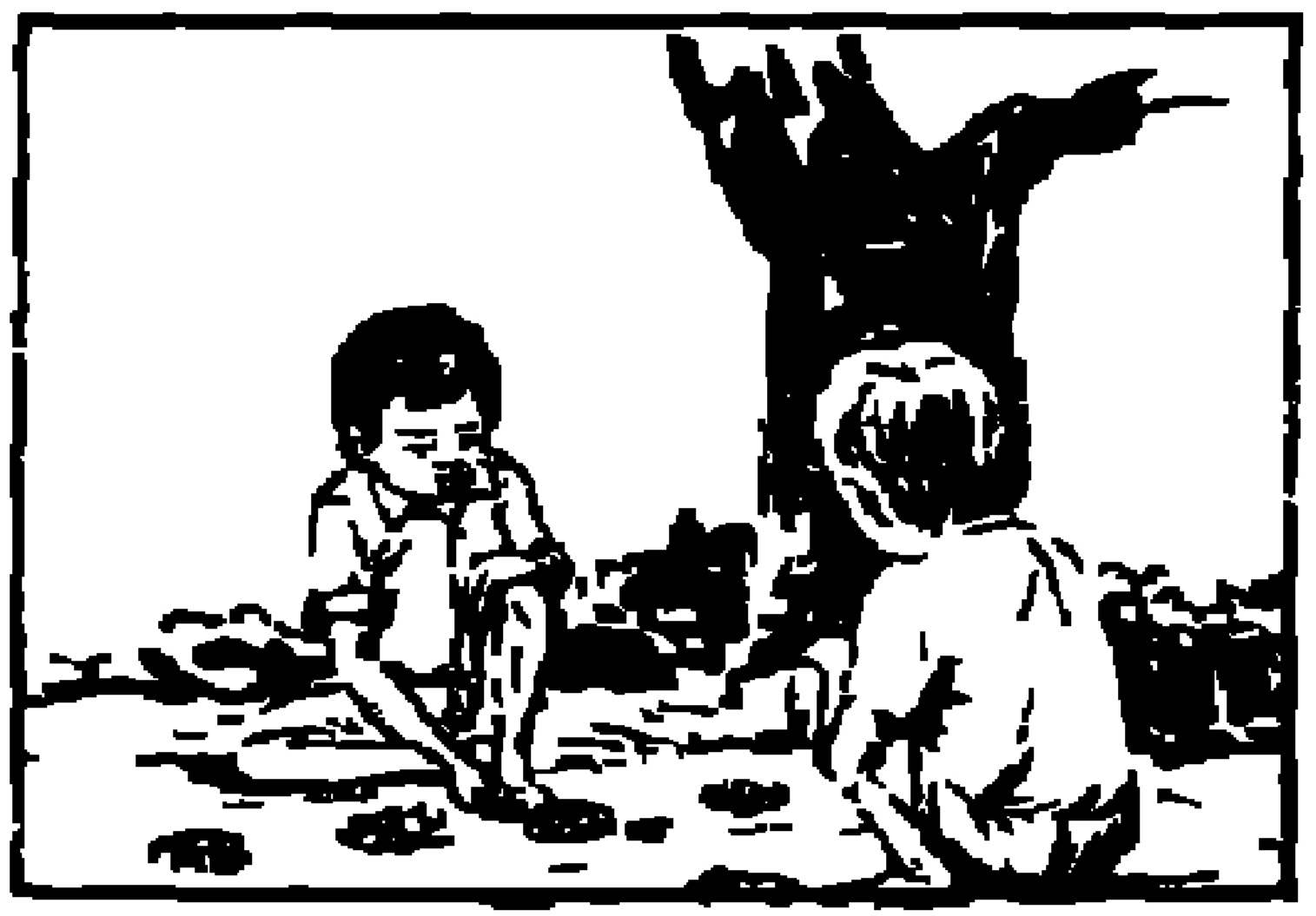
Ancient Meitei children playing toys

Toys or playthings (Meitei: Sānnapot/Shānnapot) play crucial roles in Meitei traditional games as well as different elements of Meitei culture, including but not limited to Meitei dances, Meitei festivals, Meitei folklore, Meitei folktales, Meitei history, Meitei literature, Meitei mythology, Meitei proverbs, traditional Meitei religion (Sanamahism), etc.

== Types ==
=== Kang ===
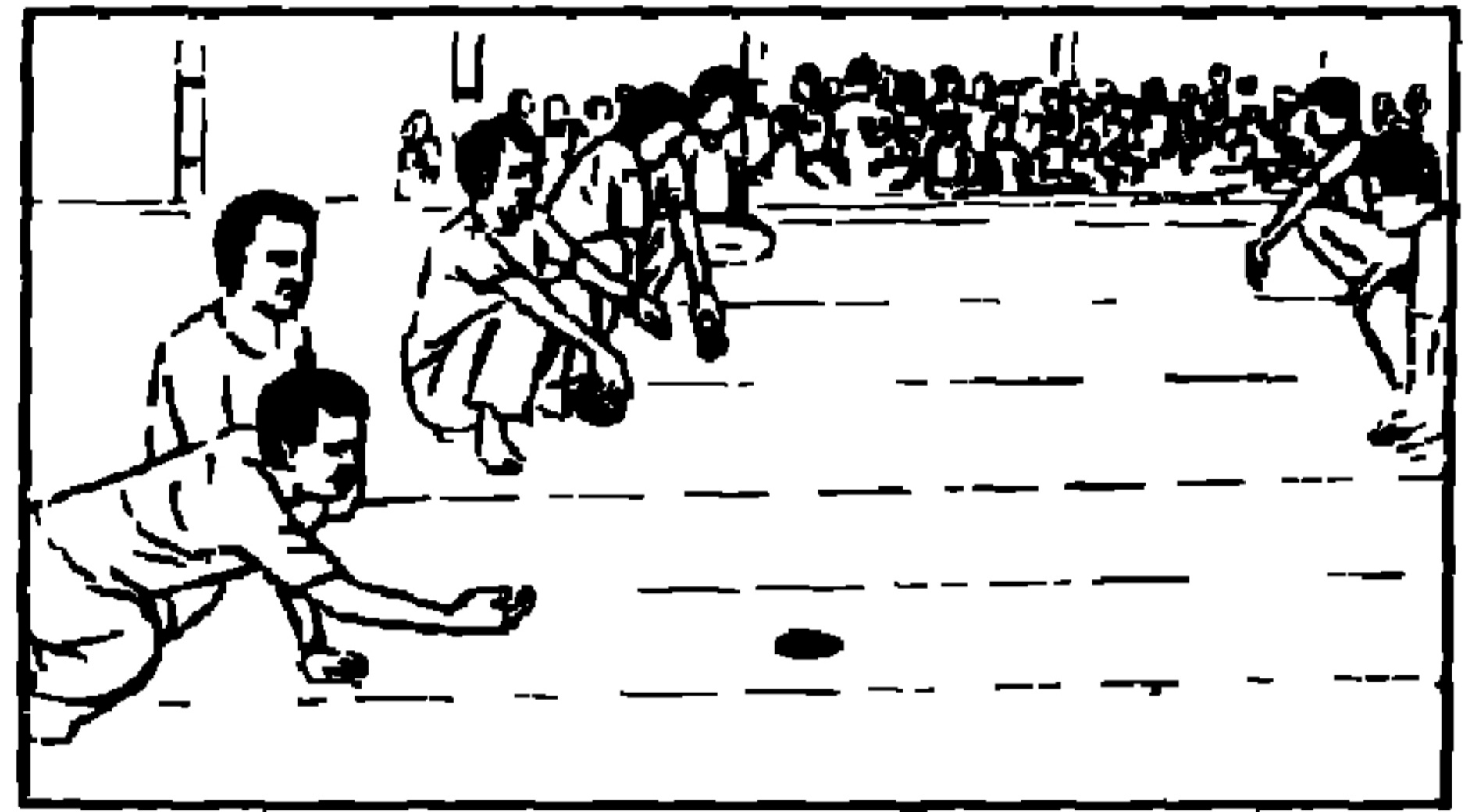
An illustration of playing Kaang

Kang (ꯀꯥꯡ) is a round or spherical object, made of ivory or lac, flat and oblong in shape, used as a plaything in the eponymous Meitei traditional game of Kang, played on the floor of an indoor place, setting goals, hit by kang playthings.

=== Kangdrum (Ball) ===
A kangdrum (ꯀꯥꯡꯗ꯭ꯔꯨꯝ) or a traditional Meitei small, hard ball, used in the Meitei traditional game of Sagol Kangjei (Meitei polo) as well as Khong Kangjei (Meitei hockey). It is usually made of seasoned bamboo and is hit with a Kangjei (mallet / polo stick / hockey stick) while riding on horses or running by feet. The goal of the game is to hit the kangdrum ball into the other team's goal using the Kangjei mallet.

=== Kangkhin ===
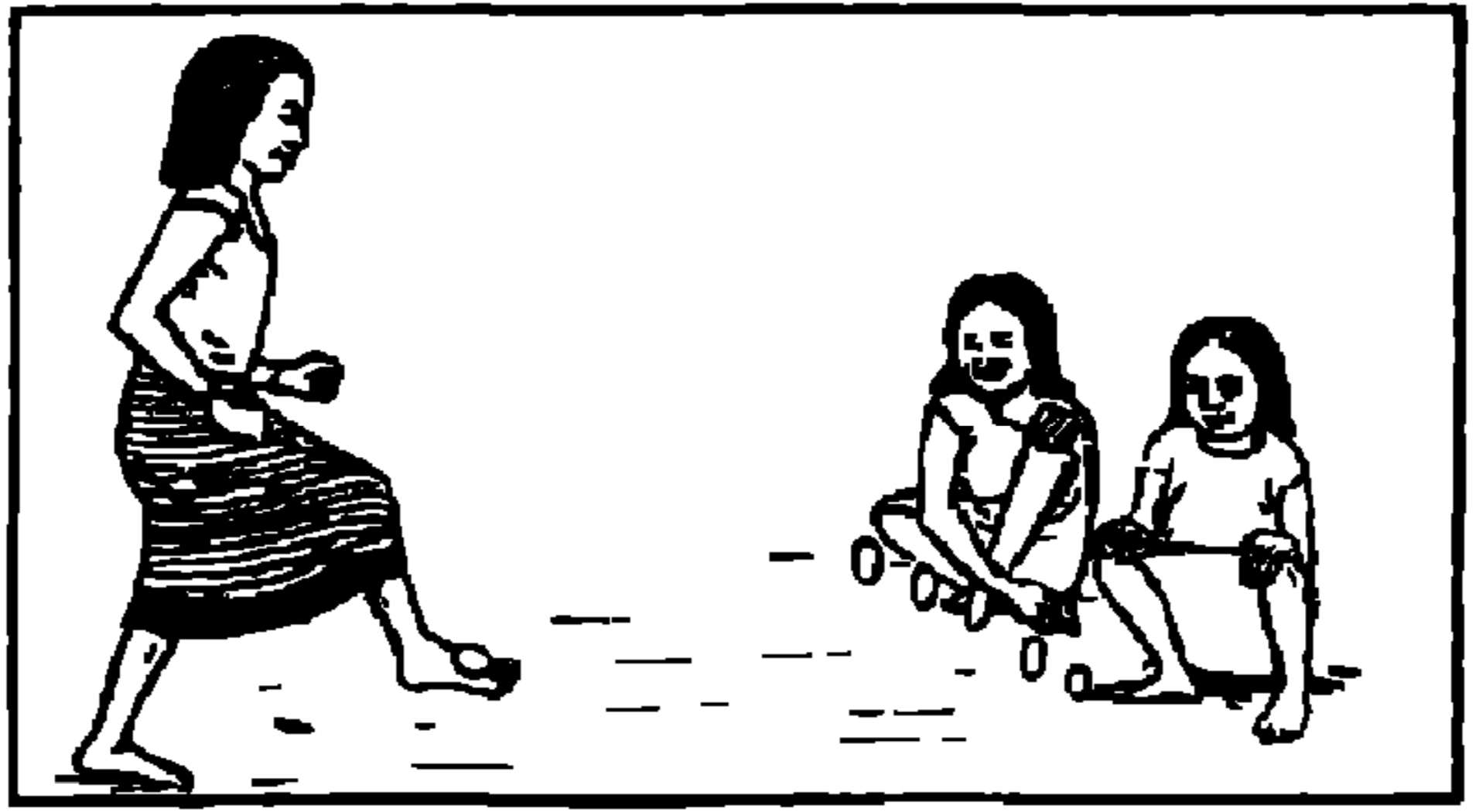
Kaangkhin playthings and players

Seeds of Kaangkhin (ꯀꯥꯡꯈꯤꯟ) or Kaangkhil (ꯀꯥꯡꯈꯤꯜ), a plant of a genus (Entada) of the mimoseae family, are traditionally used as playthings. In the eponymous game, a player places a Kaangkhin seed on the dorsal side of their foot and lifts that leg while jumping with the other leg to reach a destination. The player must not let the seed fall off her foot. At the destination, there are other Kaangkhin seeds already placed, and the goal is to hit those seeds by using their foot to throw her own Kaangkhin seed, without using their hands.

=== Kangpot ===
Kangpot (ꯀꯥꯡꯄꯣꯠ) is a Meitei term for vehicle. Traditional Meitei toy versions of vehicles or Kangpots, like carts, chariots, are popular toys that kids love to play with. They come in many types, such as with kangkhong (wheel) or without kangkhong. Playing with these toys helps children develop skills like hand-eye coordination, creativity, and problem-solving. It also lets them use their imagination and practice social skills by pretending and telling stories.

=== Khung ===
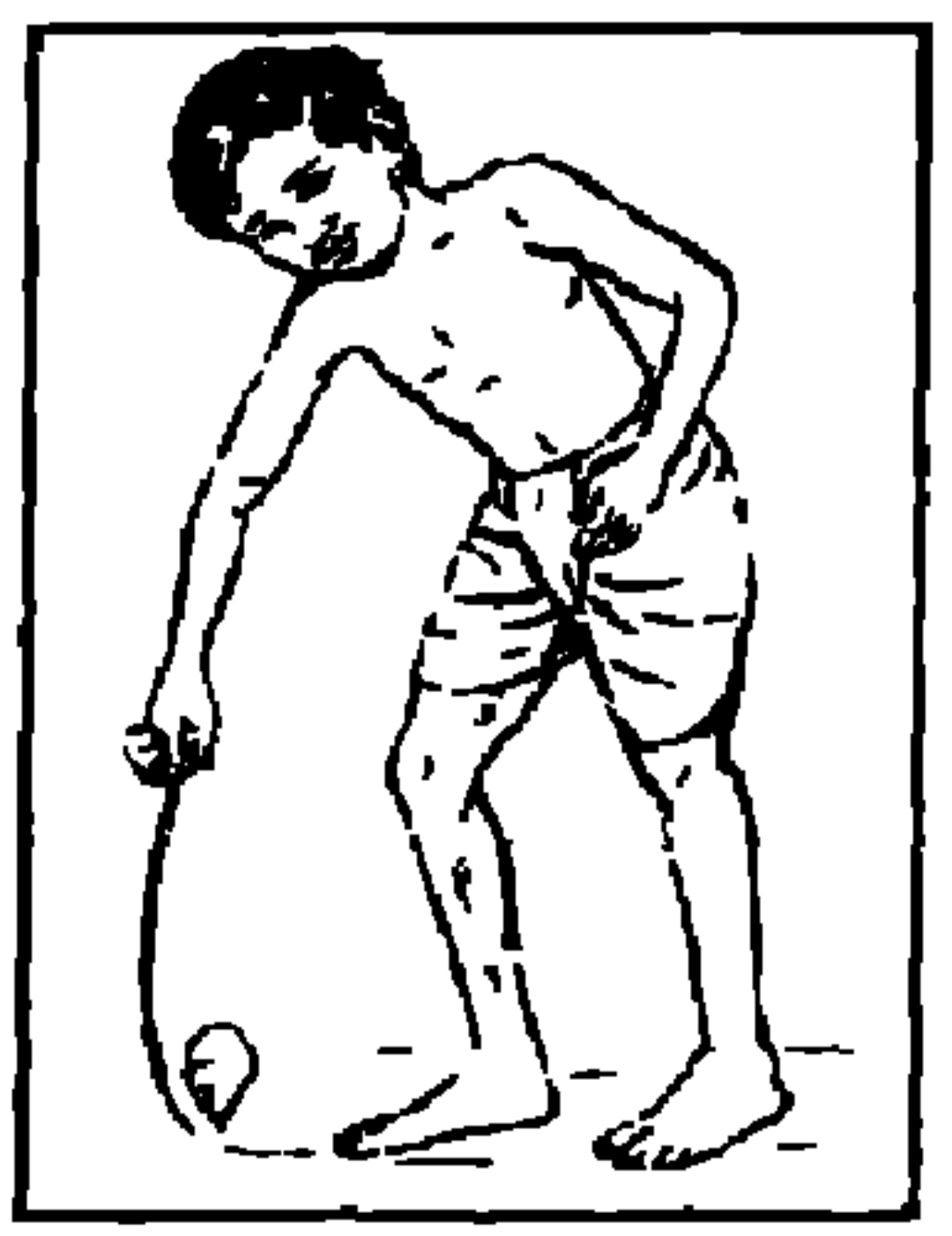
Khung top

Children play with khung or khoong tops (ꯈꯨꯡ) by tying a string around it and then pulling it to make it spin on the ground. The khung top spins quickly and stays balanced on its pointed end. Children may try to keep it spinning for a long time or make it spin in different ways. This game is usually played in open spaces where the khung top can spin freely.

=== Khullokpi items ===
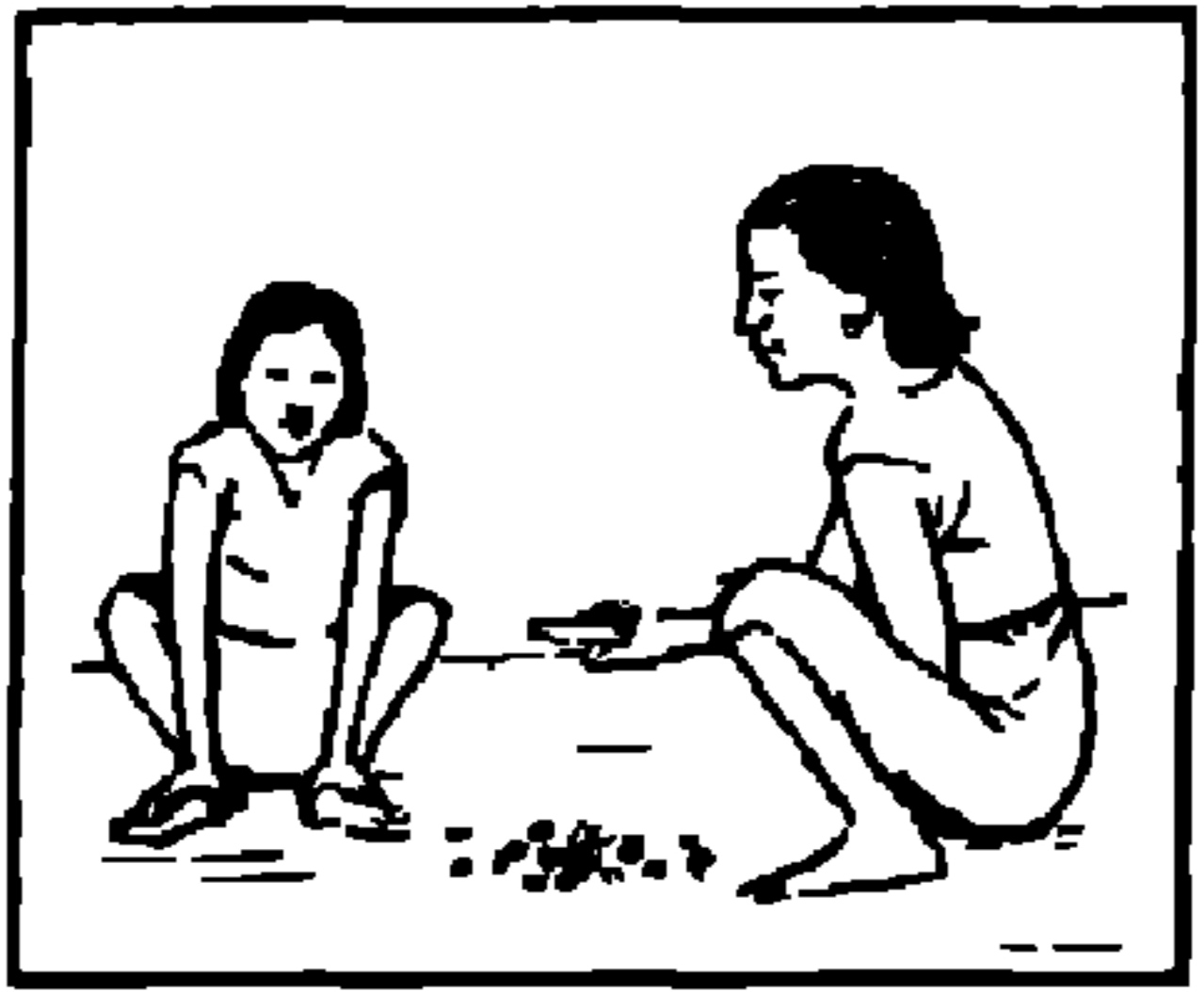
Khullokpi playthings and players

Plaything items of Khullokpi (ꯈꯨꯜꯂꯣꯛꯄꯤ) are usually small, durable objects like pebbles, brick fragments, or seeds. Players place these objects on the dorsal side of their palm, throw them upwards, and then quickly turn their palm upwards to catch as many falling objects as possible before they hit the ground. The objects that are caught are used in the next round, and the process continues until all objects are used.

=== Laidhibi (Doll) ===
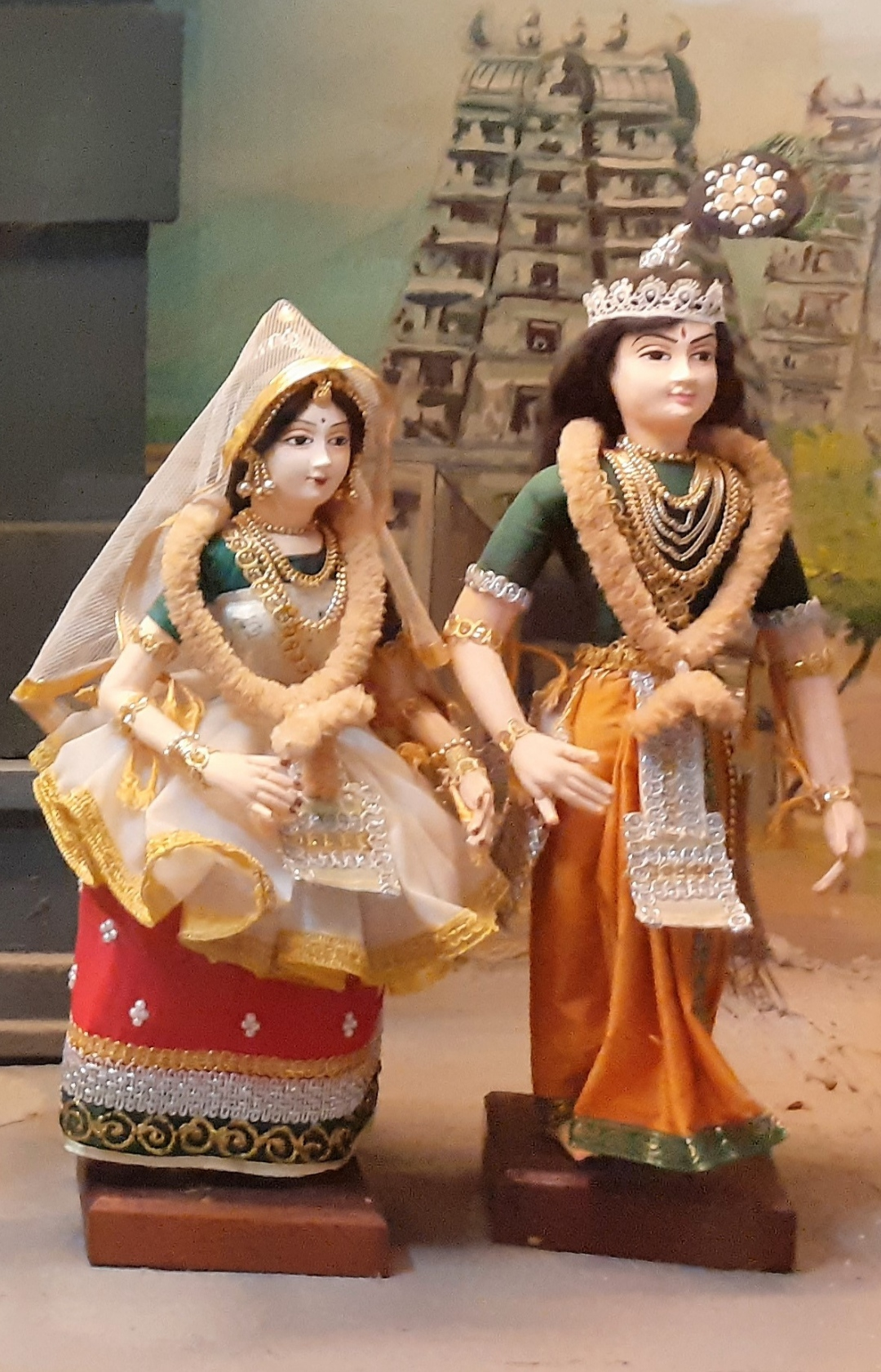
Traditional Meitei dolls of Hindu deities

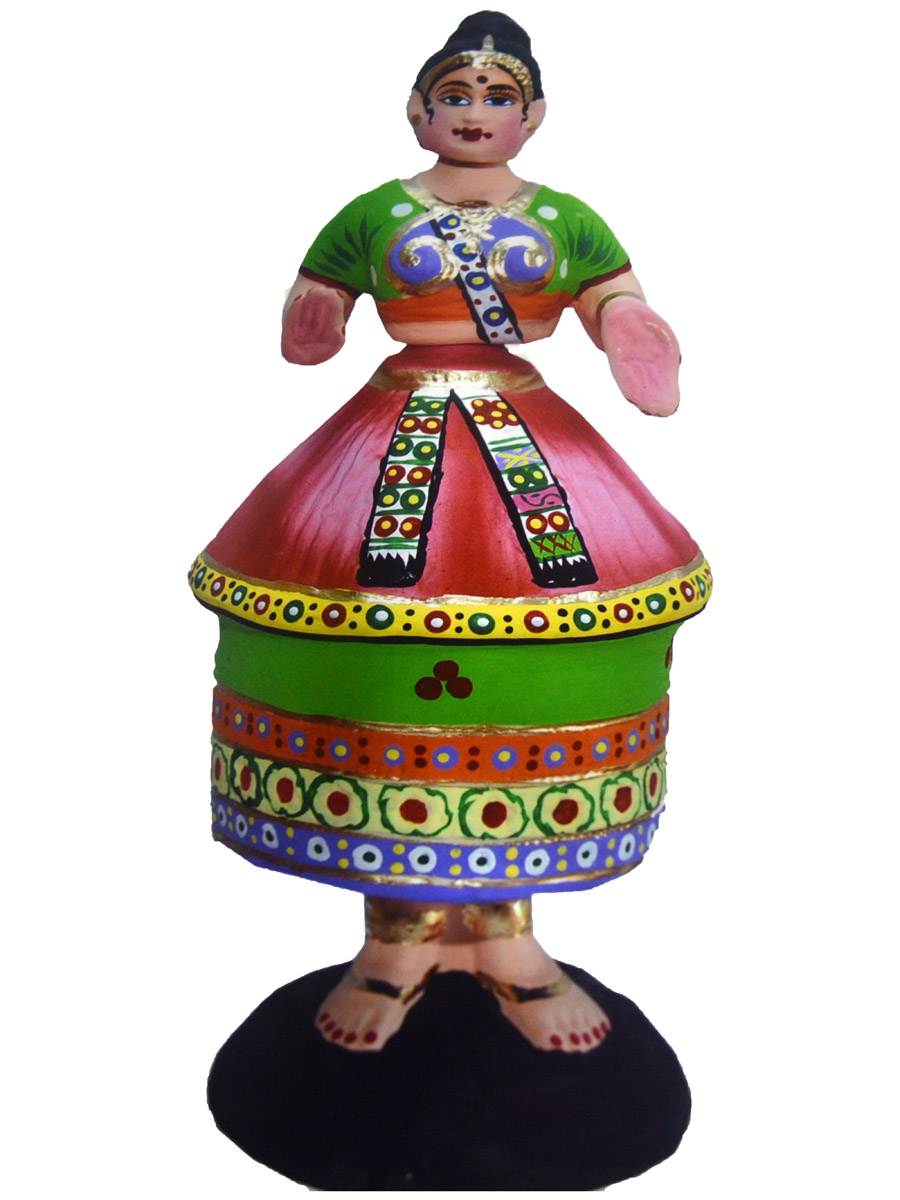
Traditional Meitei doll of a female dancer

The traditional Meitei dolls, or Laiphadibi (ꯂꯥꯏꯐꯗꯤꯕꯤ), also known as Laiphadabi (ꯂꯥꯏꯐꯗꯕꯤ) or Laidhibi (ꯂꯥꯏꯙꯤꯕꯤ) or Laidhabi (ꯂꯥꯏꯙꯕꯤ) or Laidhi, are primarily used as toys but also used as an important part of rituals of traditional Meitei religion. They are treated as if they are living spirits, with own feelings, referring to them as ‘Ita’ (ꯏꯇꯥ), which means ‘a female companion’.

Popular laiphadibi dolls are made based on characters like Khamba and Thoibi, the famous lovers from Meitei stories, Sandrembi and Chaisra, the good and evil sisters from Meitei folktales, and Radha and Krishna, the eternal lovers from the raslila in Hinduism. There are also laiphadibi dolls representing different ethnic groups of Manipur, brides and grooms, goddesses, fishing women, and even Disney princesses like Cinderella.

=== Phipul (Phibul) ===
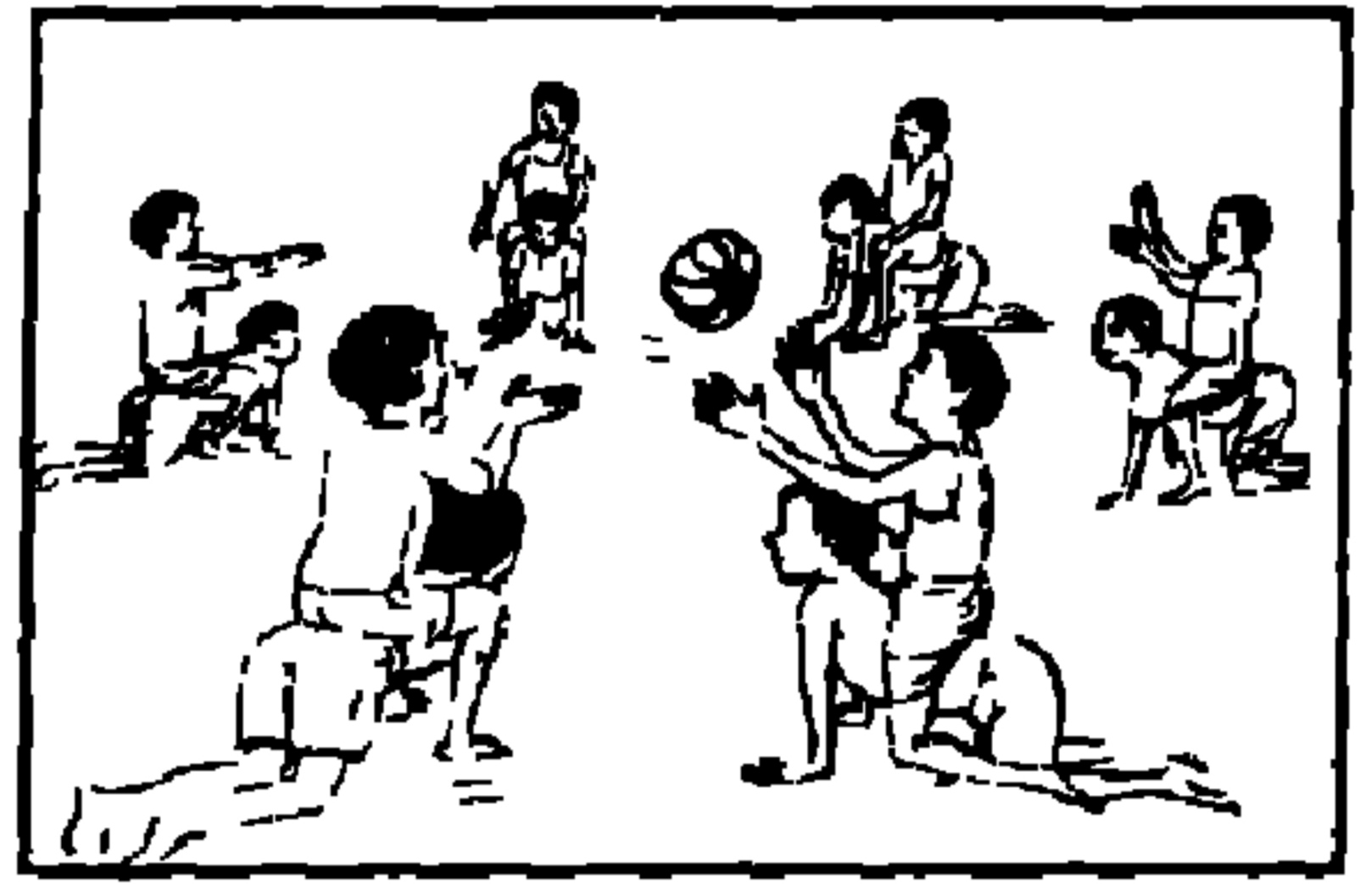
Phipul plaything and players

Phipul or Phipun (ꯐꯤꯄꯨꯜ), or Phibul or Phibun (ꯐꯤꯕꯨꯜ), the plaything of the Meitei traditional game of Phipul Haapi (ꯐꯤꯄꯨꯜ ꯍꯥꯄꯤ), or Phibul Haabi (ꯐꯤꯕꯨꯜ ꯍꯥꯕꯤ), is a large ball made from a pile of clothes, with one player throwing and another catching it. In the game, one player acts as a horse while another becomes the rider, sitting on the horse's back. Teams are formed, and the players create a large circle facing inward. They pass There are six horses and six riders, forming six pairs. The roles of horse and rider are swapped regularly. Team members cheer and encourage each other throughout the game. Unfortunately, this game is now nearly extinct and is no longer widely played.

=== Nungshit Mapi ===
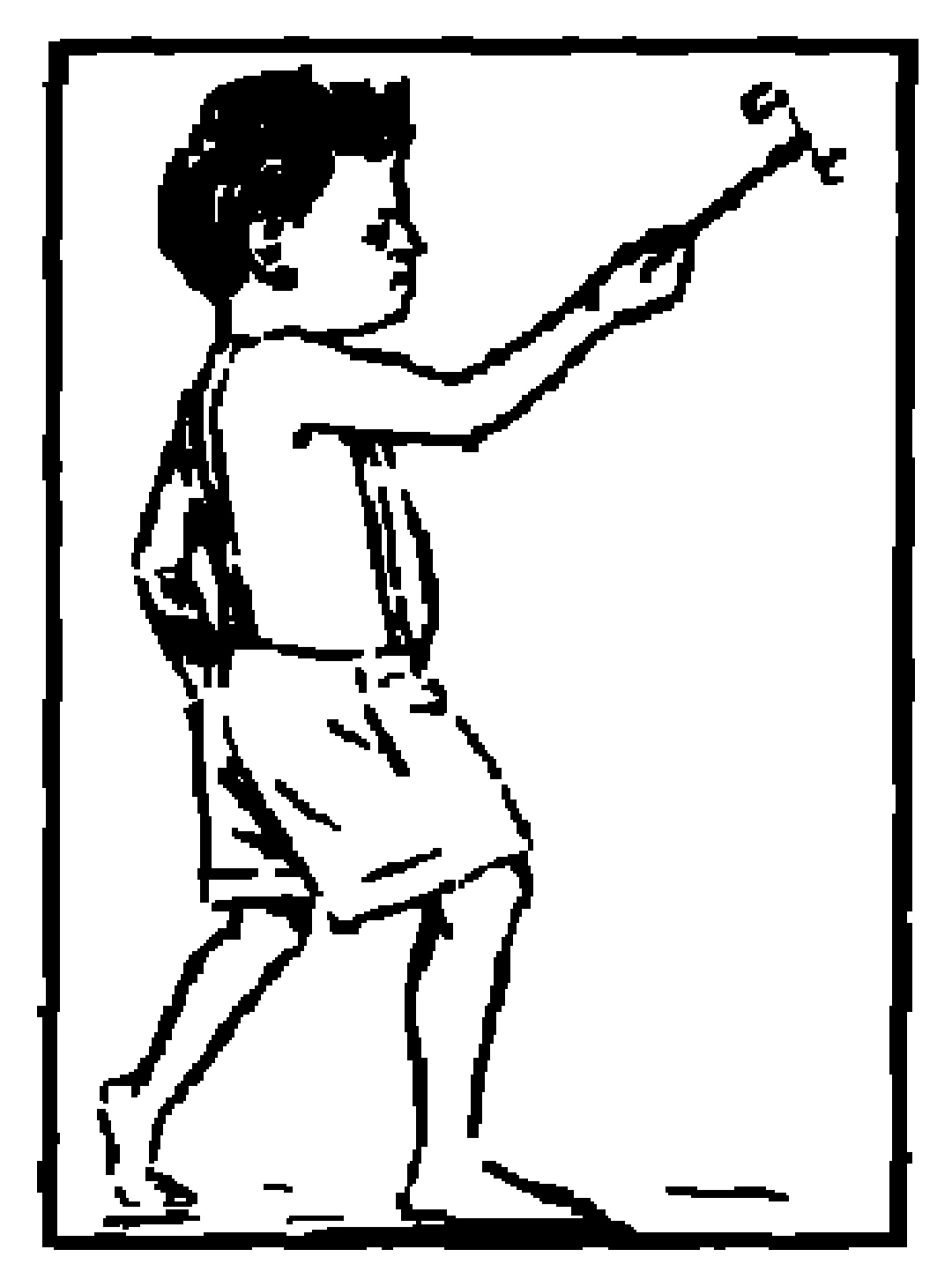
Nungshit Mapi plaything and player

Nungshit Mapi or Nungsit Mapee (ꯅꯨꯡꯁꯤꯠ ꯃꯄꯤ) is a traditional Meitei mechanical toy fan made of bamboo or wooden objects. It is played by children, creating airflow. These fans are mainly used for cooling or just for enjoyment.

=== Telanga (kite) ===
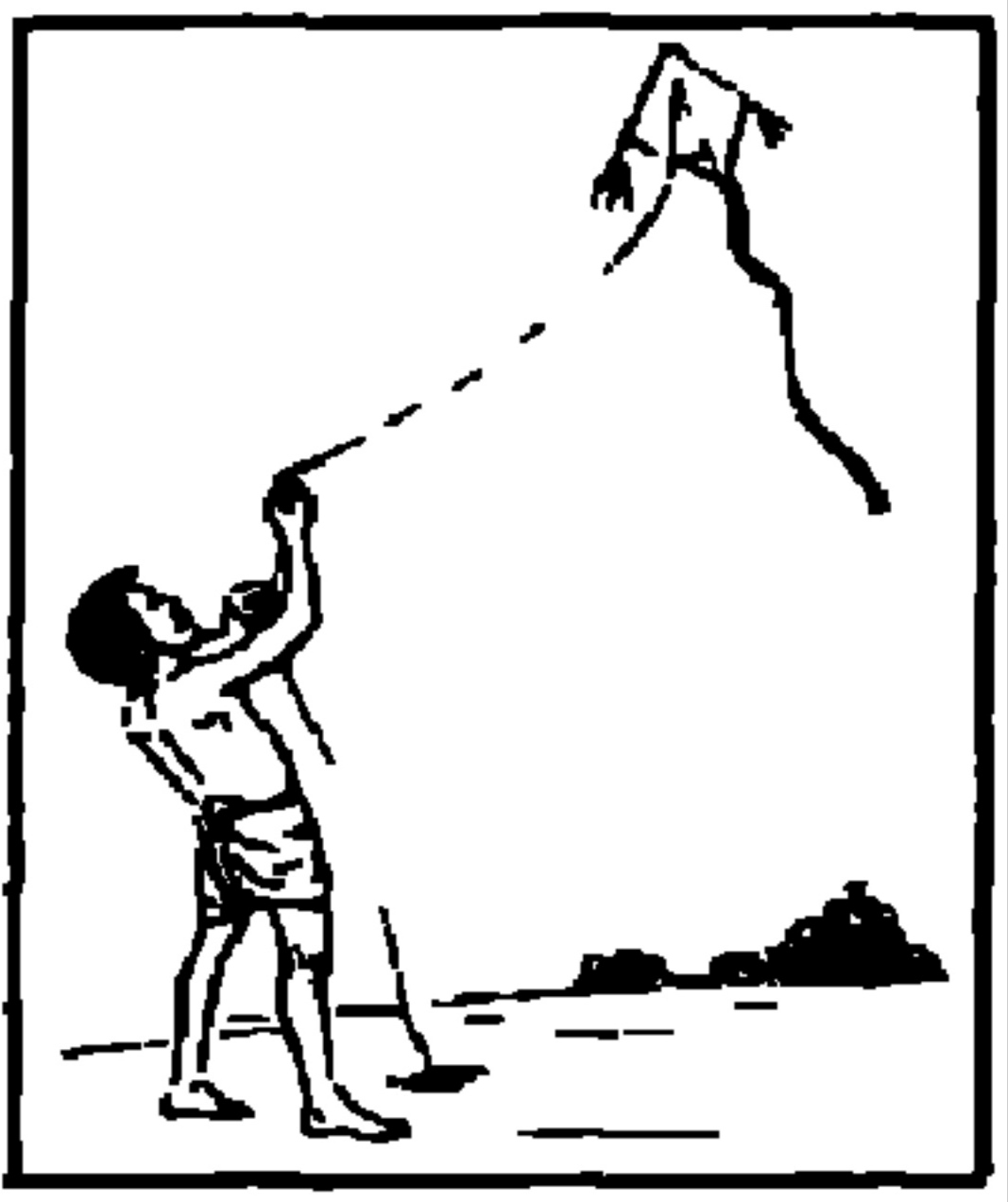
Telanga kite flying

Children fly Telanga kites (ꯇꯦꯂꯪꯒꯥ / ꯇꯦꯂꯡꯒꯥ) by holding the string and running to generate wind lift, allowing the Telanga to ascend into the air. They control the Telanga's movement by adjusting the tension on the string, guiding its direction through shifts in the wind. This activity often takes place in open areas where wind conditions are suitable for Telanga flying.

=== Yubi (Coconut) ===
Players use a slippery, oiled coconut (ꯌꯨꯕꯤ, yubi) as a ball in the Meitei traditional game of Yubi Laakpi (ꯌꯨꯕꯤ ꯂꯥꯛꯄꯤ), literally meaning "coconut snatching". The coconut is hard to hold because it is smooth and oily, making the game more difficult. Players try to pass, carry it, but it often slips or bounces in unexpected ways, making the game more fun and challenging. This is common in rural areas or during festivals.

== In mythology and folklore ==
=== Khoriphaba's toys ===
In the ancient Meitei mythology of God Khoriphaba, he cried nonstop when his mother Konthoujam Tampha Lairembi was not coming to him for a long time. He was gifted multiple precious toys, such as golden horse, golden peacock, golden tortoise, among many, by many gods, to stop him from crying.

=== Story of Ita Laiphadibee ===
There is a popular Meitei story called "Ita Laiphadibee" about a young girl who was very close to her laiphadibi (doll). When she grew up and had to marry, both she and her laiphadibi felt sad. As a gift for her love, the laiphadibi gave her the ability to understand animals' language. On her wedding night, the girl heard a fox talking about a dead man with a magic ring that would bring good luck. She went to find the body, not knowing her husband was following her. After struggling, she managed to get the ring off, but her husband thought she was a witch and reported her to the king. At court, the king asked what a crow was saying, and the girl replied that there was treasure under the tree, which was true. The king married her, made her queen, and the kingdom became prosperous. The story teaches that laiphadibis care for their human friends and can bring good fortune if treated well.

=== Laiphadibi's protection ===
According to legends, if traditional Meitei dolls, called laiphadibis, are placed at the entrance of a home, they protect the people inside and bring them good fortune. This belief comes from the ancient Meitei mythology about the goddess Panthoibi. The story says that evil spirits tried to enter the goddess's house to kidnap a family member, but a figure that looked like both a human and a god stopped them at the entrance. The spirits were scared and ran away. The laiphadibi had scared them off and kept the family safe. Because of this, people believe the laiphadibi protects homes, even when no one is there.

== In market ==
In addition to regular markets like that of the Ima Keithel, playthings are also sold at Meitei festivals like Meitei Cheiraoba (Meitei New Year), and Hindu festivals like Rath Yatra, Krishna Janmashtami, Radha Asthami, and Durga Puja. They are also sold at trade fairs, exhibitions, and tourism festivals. More and more people are buying playthings as gifts for birthdays and other occasions.

== In popular culture ==
- Laiphadibi amei yum, a book translated by G.C. Tongbra
- Ita Laiphadibi (My Dear Doll): A Manipuri Folk Tale, a book
- Ema Laiphadibi (2010), a Meitei language movie

== See also ==
- Women in Meitei civilization
- Meitei martial arts
- Meitei traditional weapons
- Lai Haraoba
- Meitei astronomy
