= Konthoujam =

Konthoujam is a Meitei ethnic family name (surname). Notable people with this family name are:

- Govindas Konthoujam, Indian politician
- Konthoujam Tampha Lairembi, a princess that turned into a goddess in Meitei mythology
- Khonthoujam Boboi Singh, Indian footballer
- Khonthoujam Hrishikesh Singh, Former Director of Administration of a project of IFAD in North Eastern India.

== See also ==
- Konthoujam (disambiguation)
