= Se Se Seboti =

Traditional Meitei song and game

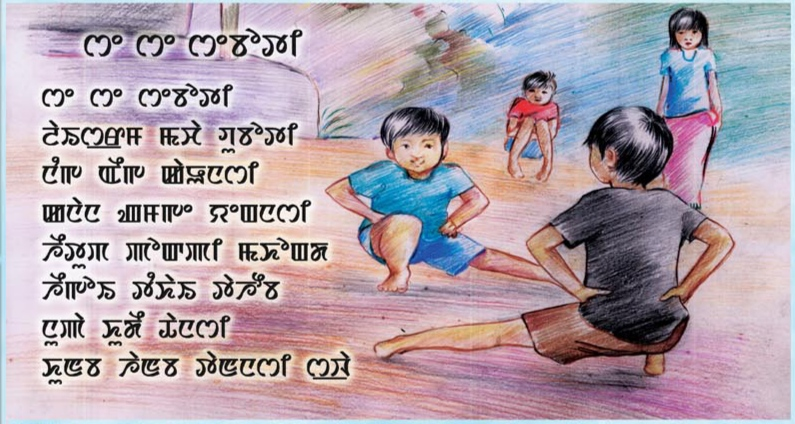
Se Se Seboti - a traditional Meitei children's song of Kangleipak

Se Se Seboti (or Seboti Kaonaba, also known as Seboti Kaonabi) refers to both a Meitei traditional game and a Meitei language song, sung during the game. It is very popular among the children of Meitei ethnicity of Manipur. It has traditional cultural meaning and is played by both boys and girls. The game is accompanied by singing, with players singing in a rhythmic pattern.

== Lyrics ==
Se se seboti Boboti son of Laishram, Let us have a duel To see who defeats who Like a Kouna (reed) I can uproot you Like a Thambou (stalk of lotus) I can break you Let's bid for girls cloth Then let's bid for Khudei At the foot of the Heitroi (Flocourtia Cataphracta) tree Heitroi fruit fallen into half Let us see who pick it first Swah! (Disperse)

— English translation

== Analysis ==
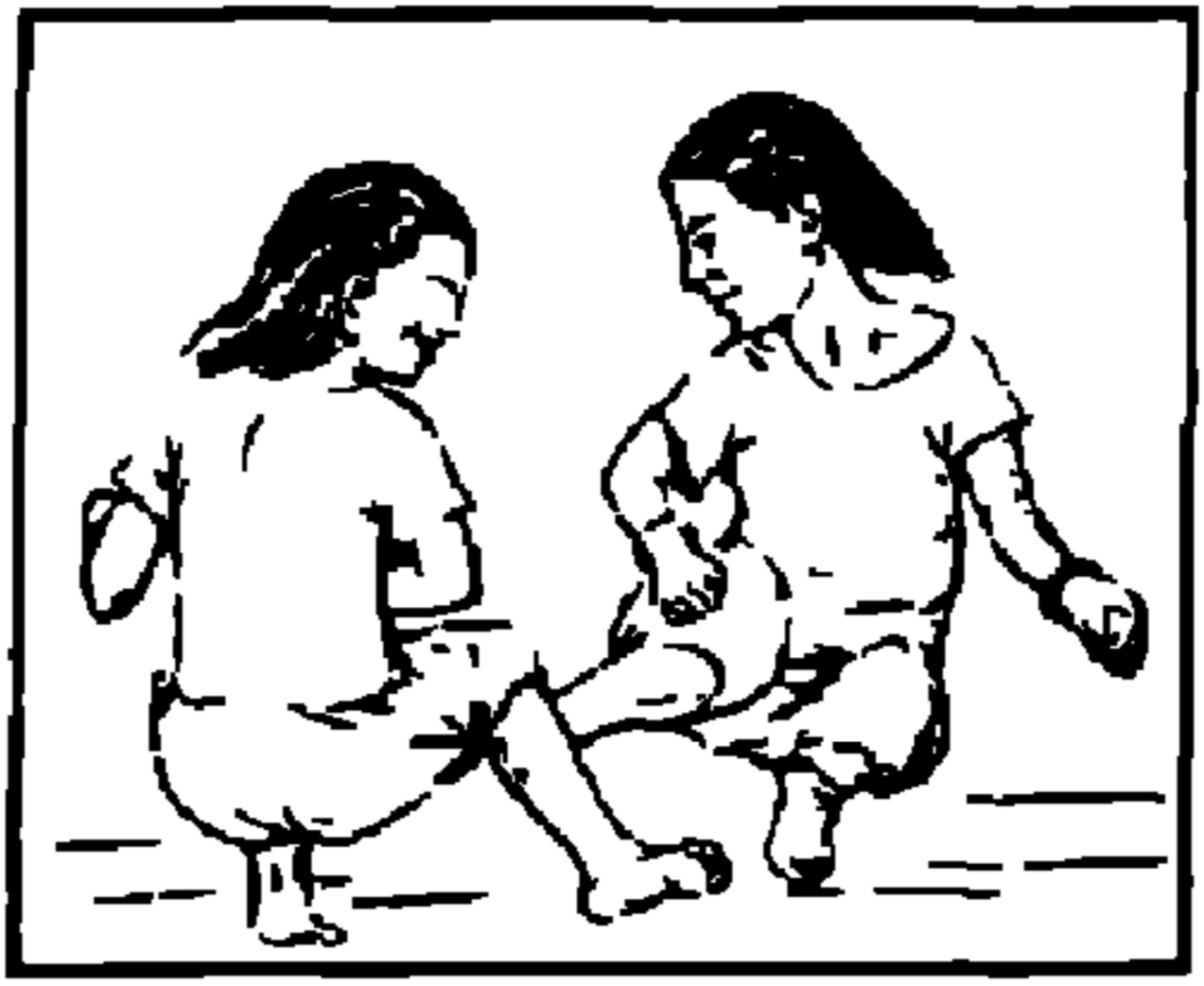
An illustration of the Seboti Kaonaba (aka Sepoti Kaonapa) game

In the phrase "Nupa Khudei Thanasi," which means "Then let's bid for Khudei," Khudei refers to a short cloth worn by men around the waist, covering up to the knee (Sanahal, 1969, p. 29). Manipur has always been a place of conflict, with battles between different clans and outsiders from Burma, Shan kingdom, Pong, and other areas. The early history of Manipur was marked by continuous fights and challenges, showing the strength and skills of its people.

Every Manipuri male was a born warrior fighter in the past. To express and maintain the dignity of the heroic ancestors was their foremost deity. Hero worship is their cult. Their motto is "the world is for the brave"... The culture of Manipuri martial art went hand in hand with the consolidation of their political power and society.

— Singh (1993b, p. 47)

Meitei martial arts show the rich and unique culture of people who believe in nature spirits. Meitei stories often praise the bravery and strength of men. Seboti Kaonaba is one example, as it helps young boys get stronger. Girls also play a similar game. Manipur grows many tasty fruits and vegetables, like peaches and pears. The fruit called Heitroi (Puneala plum) represents the rich and fertile land of Manipur.

== In popular culture ==
An eponymous music video album 'Se Se Seboti' by Malem and Matou Production was released in 2023 at Ibotombi Khumancha's home in Yairipok Bishnunaha Pukhri Achouba Mapal. Sur Lai, Anand, and Amrika are the singers featured in the album. Se Se Seboti is the fifth music video album by Malem and Matou Production, continuing their work to create music that celebrates the region's culture.
