= Meitei traditional games =

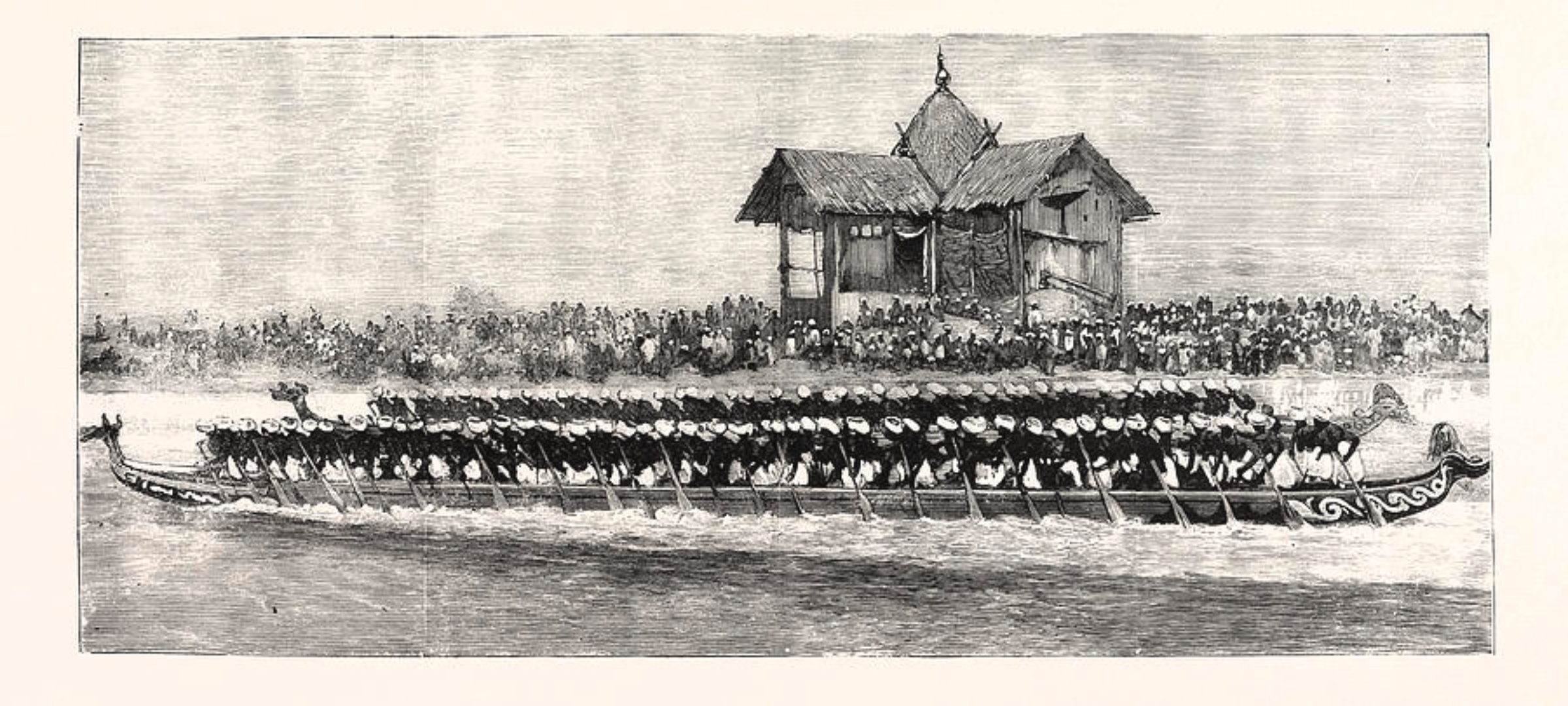
Hiyang Tannaba in the imperial moat of the Kangla Fort of Imphal

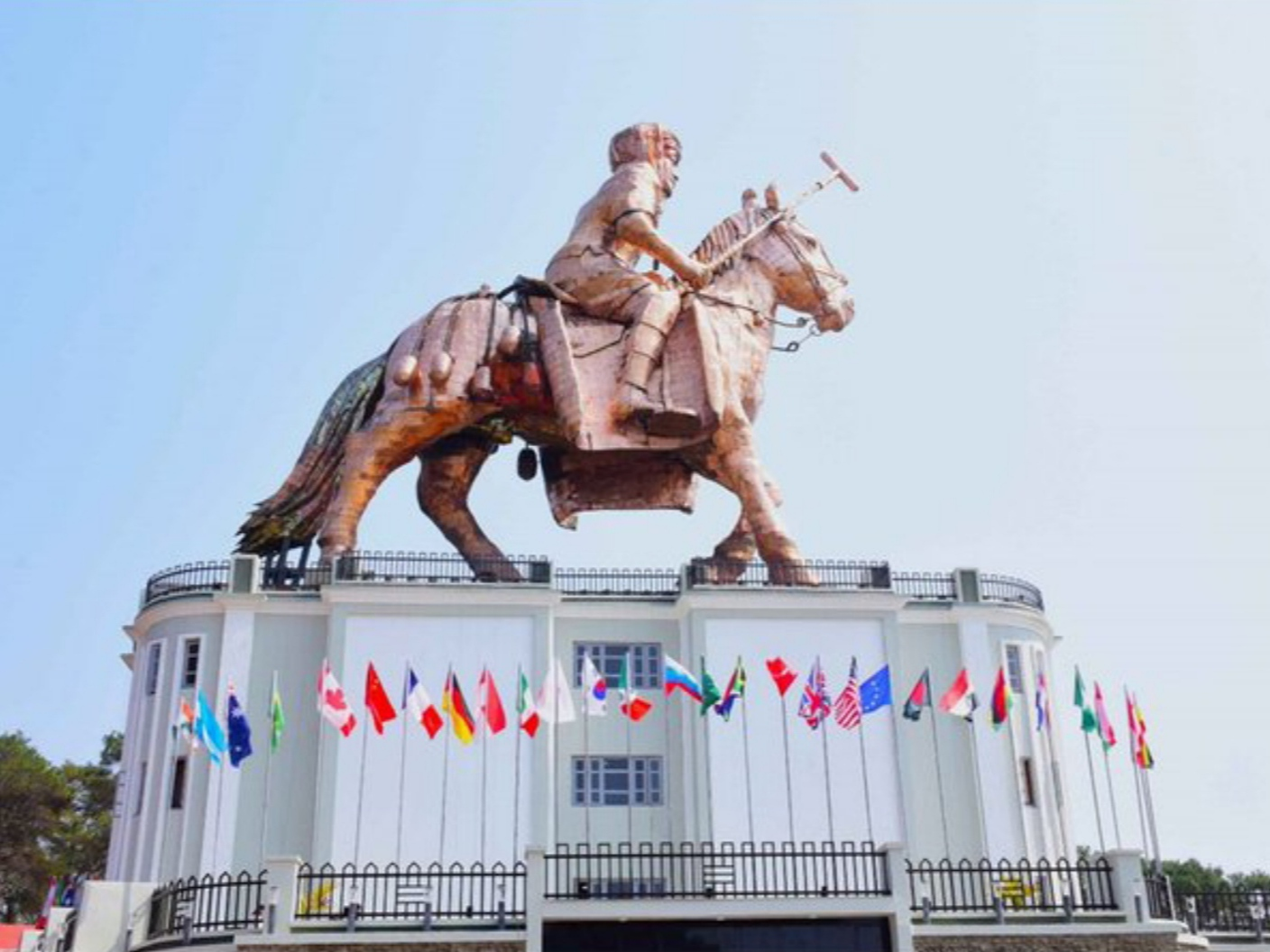
Marjing Polo Statue, the world's tallest statue of a polo player, depicted as playing Sagol Kangjei (traditional Meitei polo)

Meitei traditional games or Meitei indigenous games are an important part of the Meitei intangible cultural heritage. Originally developed by the Meitei people (also known as Manipuris) in Manipur, Assam, Tripura as well as in Bangladesh and Myanmar, these games are not just for fun; they are closely connected to social, spiritual, and community life. These often use Meitei traditional toys. They have ancient roots and show the values, skills, and beliefs of the Meitei civilisation, often focusing on agility, teamwork, strategy, and endurance. Played during different seasons and festivals, these games encourage unity, a sense of belonging, and respect for nature, while also helping pass down knowledge to future generations.

== Multigenerational games ==
=== Arambai Hunba ===
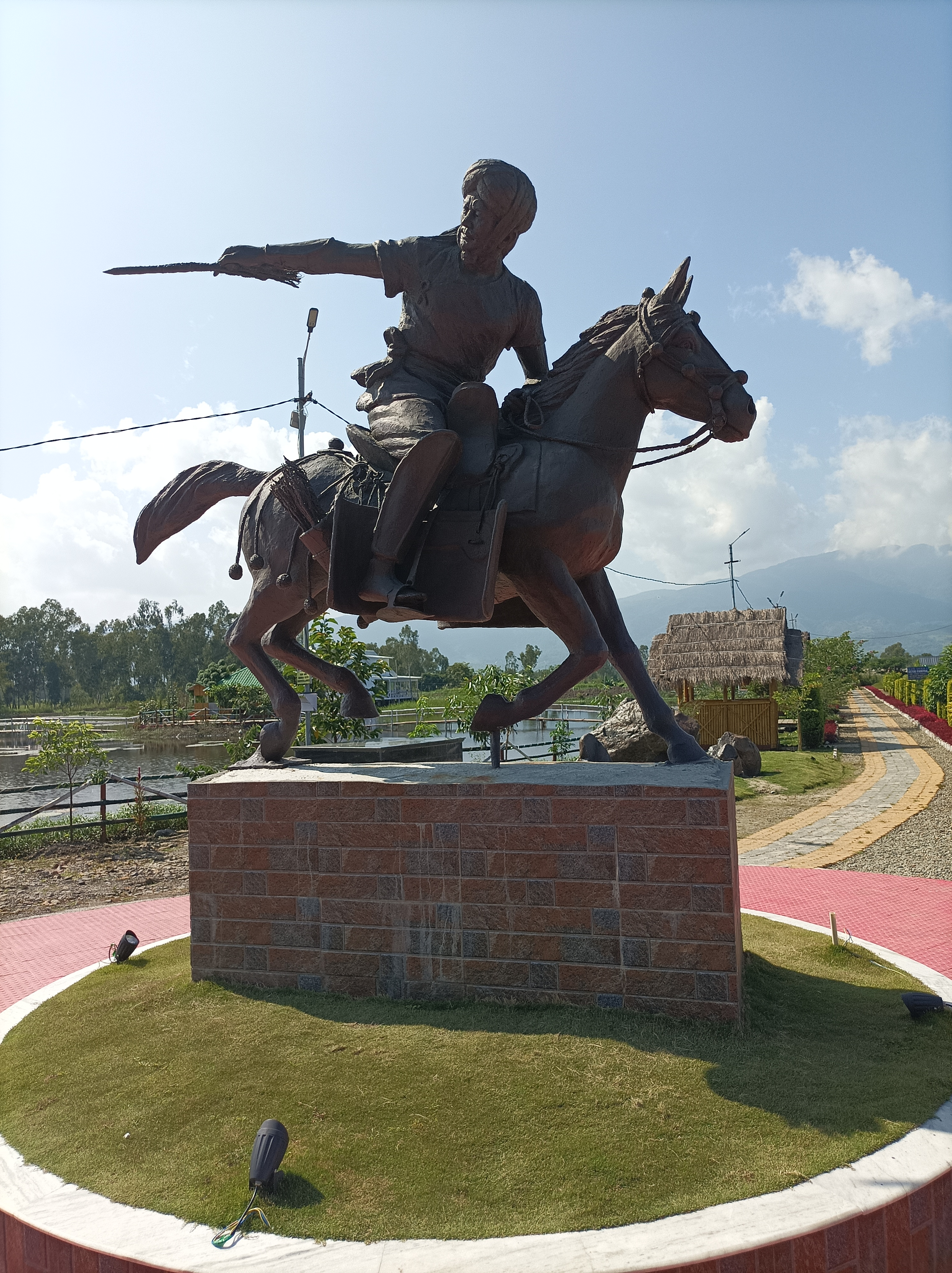
Depiction of an ancient Meitei cavalry soldier, trying to throw an Arambai weapon backwards (traditionally towards the pursuing enemies)

Arambai Hunba (ꯑꯔꯥꯝꯕꯥꯏ ꯍꯨꯟꯕ) is a traditional Meitei practice that involves riding ponies, especially in villages near breeding areas. Young boys ride ponies without saddles, sometimes using a rope instead of a bridle and branches of small trees as Arambai weapons. This practice helped develop the Arambai force, a martial art that was crucial for military operations, including advancing and withdrawing forces.

=== Hiyaang Taannaba ===
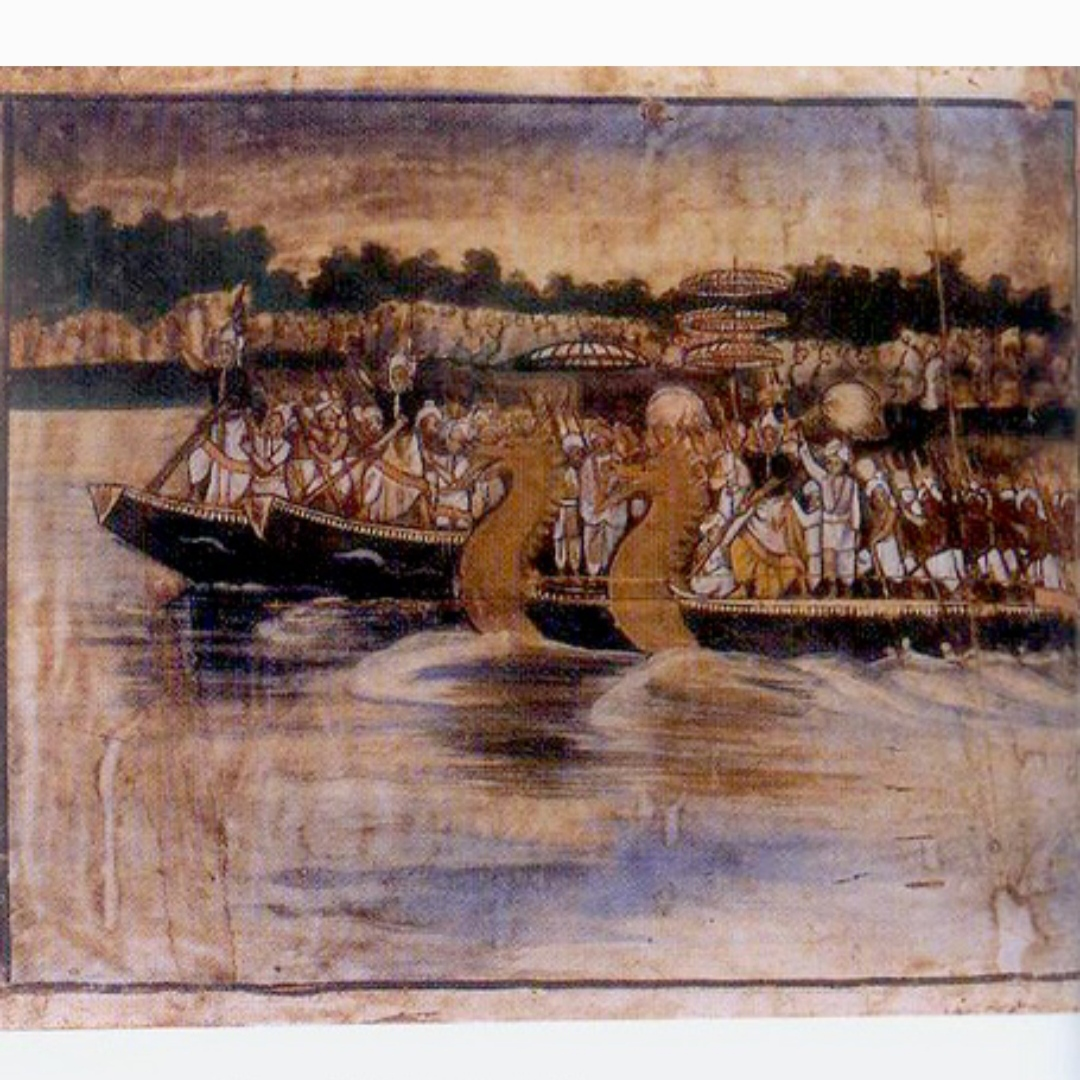
A watercolor painting of Hiyang Tannaba

Hiyang Tannaba (/hiyaang taannaba/), or boat race (ꯍꯤꯌꯥꯡ ꯇꯥꯟꯅꯕ), is a traditional Meitei game held in November. It was introduced during the reign of King Khunjaoba, the son of King Khagemba, who built the Kangla Fort moat in 1660.

In the race, two boats called "Tanahi" are prepared for the leaders, known as "Tengmai Lappa." Each boat is rowed by forty Hiroys (boatsmen). The "Hiyang Hiren" (Main Boat) carries the king and follows the two race boats. The first boat to reach the finish line wins, and all boatsmen raise their oars to signal the victory.

=== Kaang ===
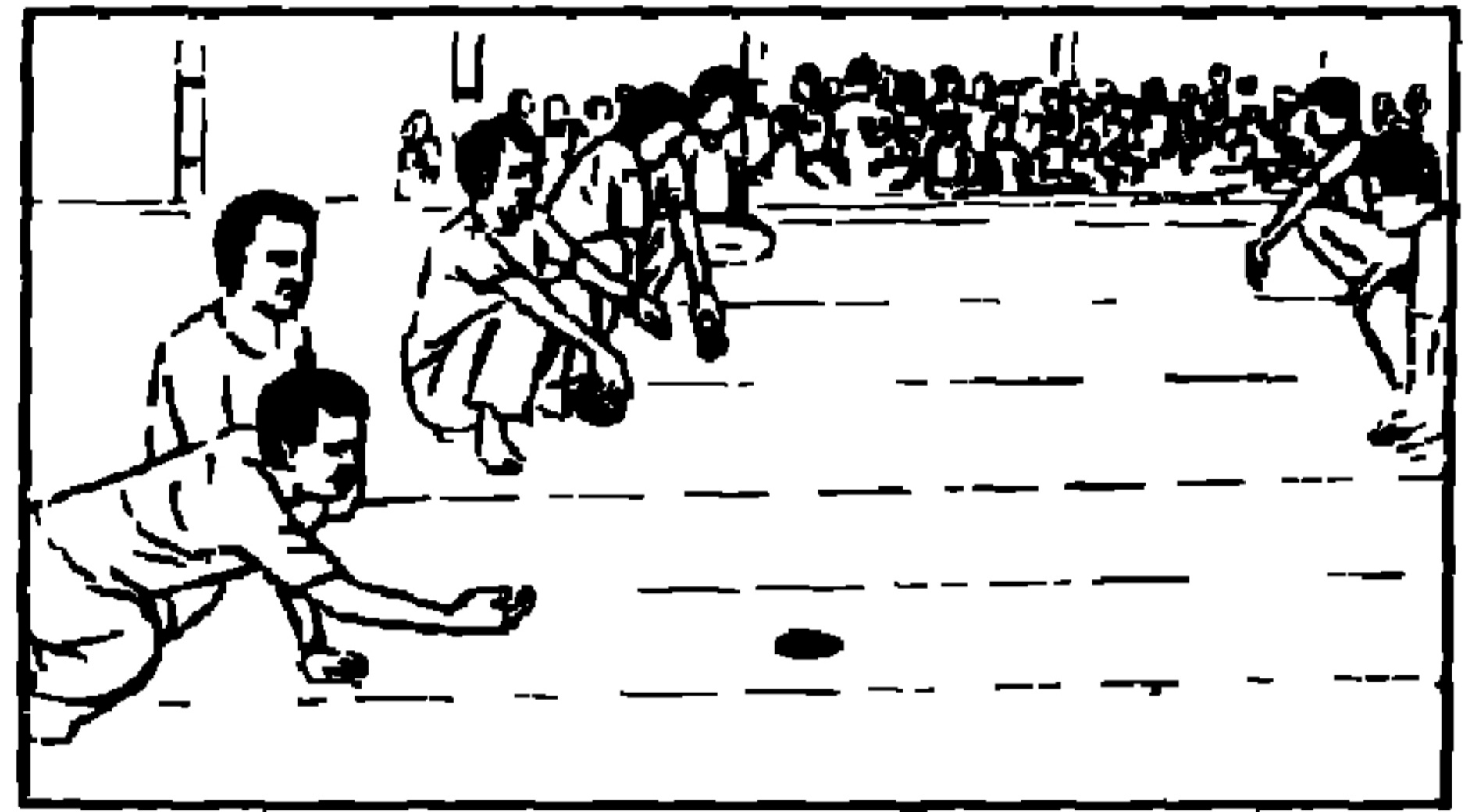
An illustration of playing Kaang

Kang (ꯀꯥꯡ, /kaang/) is an indoor game played by both male and female Meiteis, believed to have been played by the goddess Panthoibi. It is played on a smooth, level earth court, with well-marked positions for players to hit a target. The game follows specific rules set by associations, which apply to both tournaments and friendly matches. Historically, it was played from Cheiraoba (Meitei New Year) to Kang Chingba (Meitei chariot pulling festival) during the summer. Today, Kang is played in various tournaments throughout the year, with modified rules to improve the game. The royal family, including the king and queen, also participated in the game during social functions.

=== Mukna Kangjei (Khong Kangjei) ===
Mukna Kangjei (ꯃꯨꯛꯅꯥ ꯀꯥꯡꯖꯩ), also known as Khong Kangjei (ꯈꯣꯡ ꯀꯥꯡꯖꯩ), is a traditional game of the Meitei people that combines Mukna (wrestling) and Kangjei (cane stick). It originated from the Lai Haraoba festival and was patronized by King Khagemba in the 17th century. The game is played between two teams of seven players each, using a cane stick and a ball made of bamboo roots. The objective is to carry or hit the ball to the opponent's goal line. The game has evolved over time and was featured in the 1999 National Games held in Imphal.

=== Mukna ===
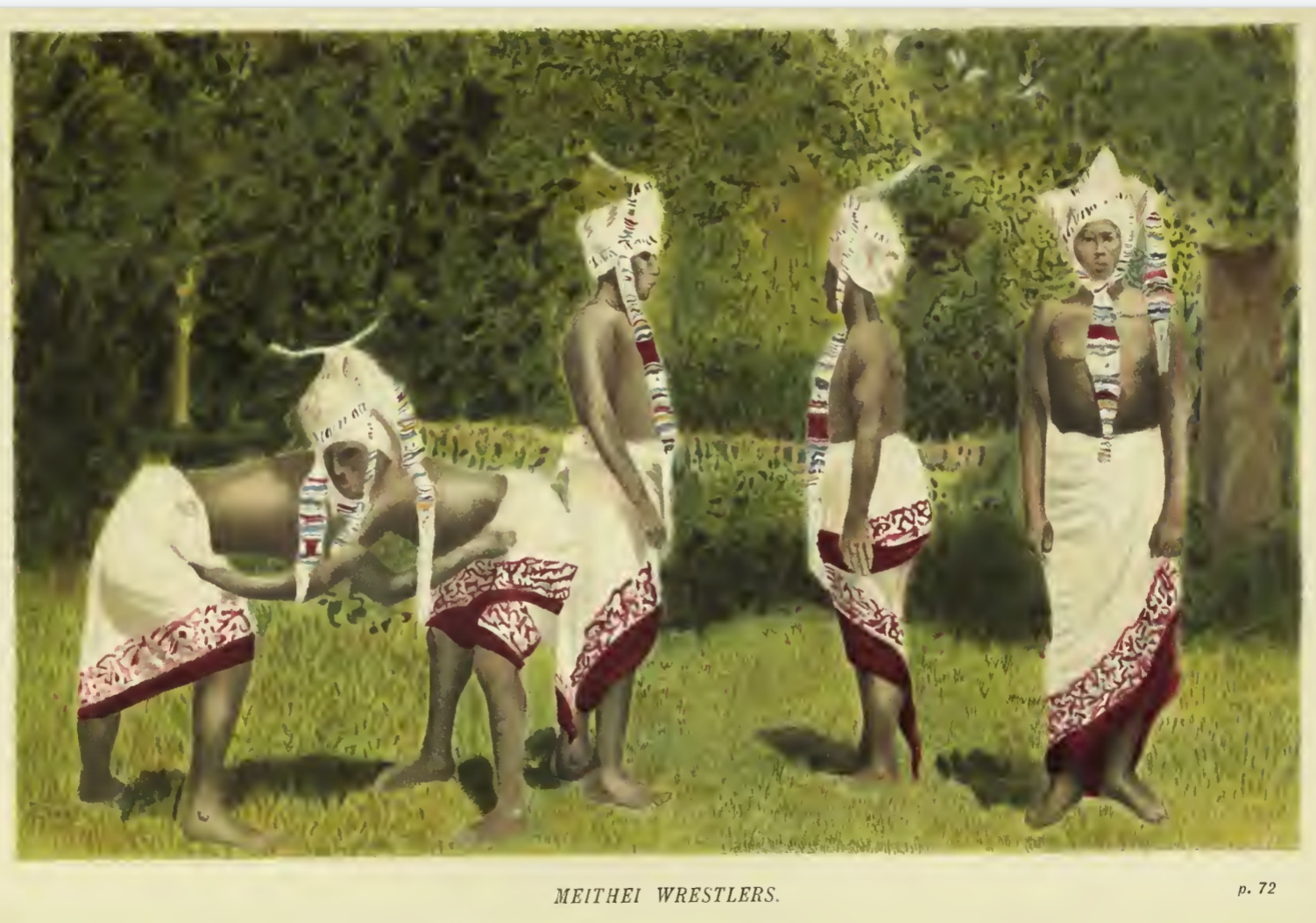
Meitei wrestlers

Mukna (ꯃꯨꯛꯅꯥ), a traditional Meitei wrestling sport, is considered one of the toughest and has been a part of Meitei cultural heritage for a long time. It should not be confused with Mukna Kangjei. It is a popular game played by two people trained by a village Master, who is known as the "Unbeaten person." The game follows basic rules agreed upon by Mukna organizations and with royal approval. It is organized by the Pana Loisang, under the control of the ruler and village groups. There are four Panas—Ahallup, Naharup, Khabam, and Laipham—that manage the schedule and events, with the final match attended by the ruler, who awards the Champion of the Year title, along with prizes such as Thum Nama (a bag of salt), Ngabong Phi (handmade cotton cloth), exemption from state duties, and traditional Ningham Samjin clothing.

The sport has two categories: (1) Takhatnabi (League) and (2) Naitom (Knockout). Young players train and compete year-round to earn the title of Mukna Champion of Manipur.

=== Sagol Kangjei ===
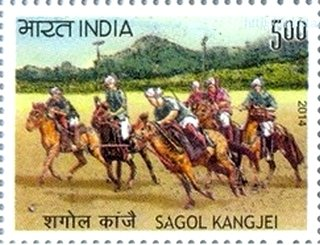
A stamp of India showing Sagol Kangjei

Sagol Kangjei (ꯁꯒꯣꯜ ꯀꯥꯡꯖꯩ), meaning "Kangjei on horseback," is a traditional Meitei game originating in ancient Kangleipak, introduced by King Kangba. Regular play began in 1606 under King Khagemba, with formal rules established later. The game is played by two teams of seven players on horseback, requiring skill in riding and controlling a stick and ball. It is governed by the principle of fair play. The game was further organized in the early 20th century by Maharaja Sir Chandrakirti Singh at Mapal Kangjeibung. Manipur is considered the birthplace of polo, with notable players like Yubaraj Bir Tikendrajit Singh and (L) Oja Tombi.

=== Yubi Laakpi ===
Yubi Lakpi (ꯌꯨꯕꯤ ꯂꯥꯛꯄꯤ, /yubi laakpi/), meaning "coconut capturing," is a traditional Meitei game that is physically demanding. Before the game begins, players rub mustard oil and water on their bodies to make them slippery. A coconut soaked in oil is placed in front of a chief guest.

Players wear a langot (cloth undergarment) securely tied in front. A senior umpire oversees the game, ensuring no fouls are committed. The game is typically played during a holy festival at the royal palace ground in Imphal, with the royal presence.

=== Woo Laobi ===
Woolaobi (ꯋꯨꯂꯥꯎꯕꯤ) is an outdoor game mainly played by females in Meitei culture. According to Meitei mythology, the game is believed to be played by the seven celestial sisters, Helloi Taret, in the courtyards of temples dedicated to Umang Lai deities.

The participants are divided into two groups: Raiders (Attackers) and Defenders (Avoiders). The Raiders must say "woo" continuously while trying to touch the Defenders. If a Raider touches a Defender, the Defender is out. If a Raider stops saying "woo" or gets too tired, the Raider is out. Points are counted based on the elimination of Raiders or Defenders.

If the Raiders are tired, they can request a change of sides, and a time limit is set for the change. The game's basic principles are similar to Kabaddi.

== Children's games ==
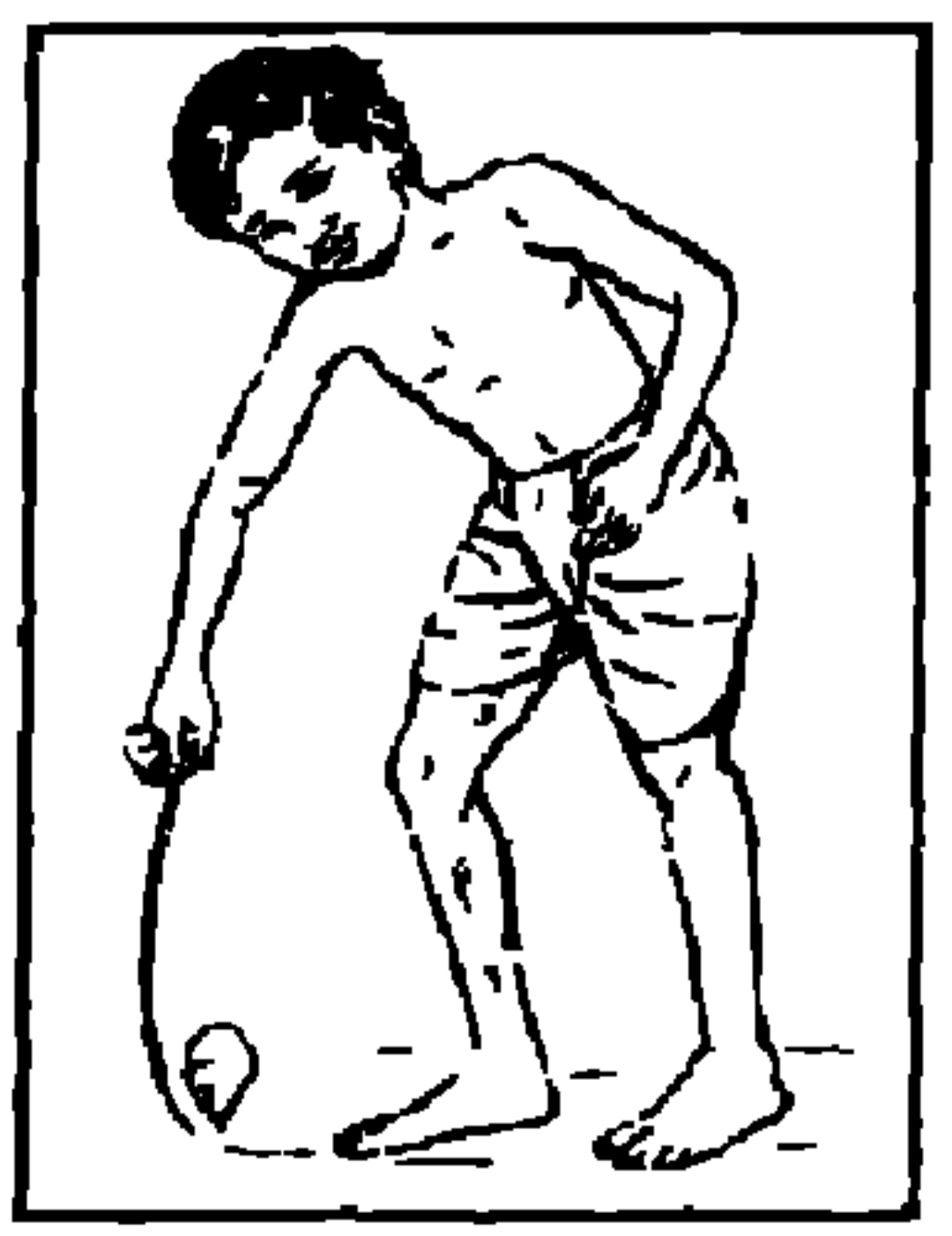
Playing traditional Meitei tops

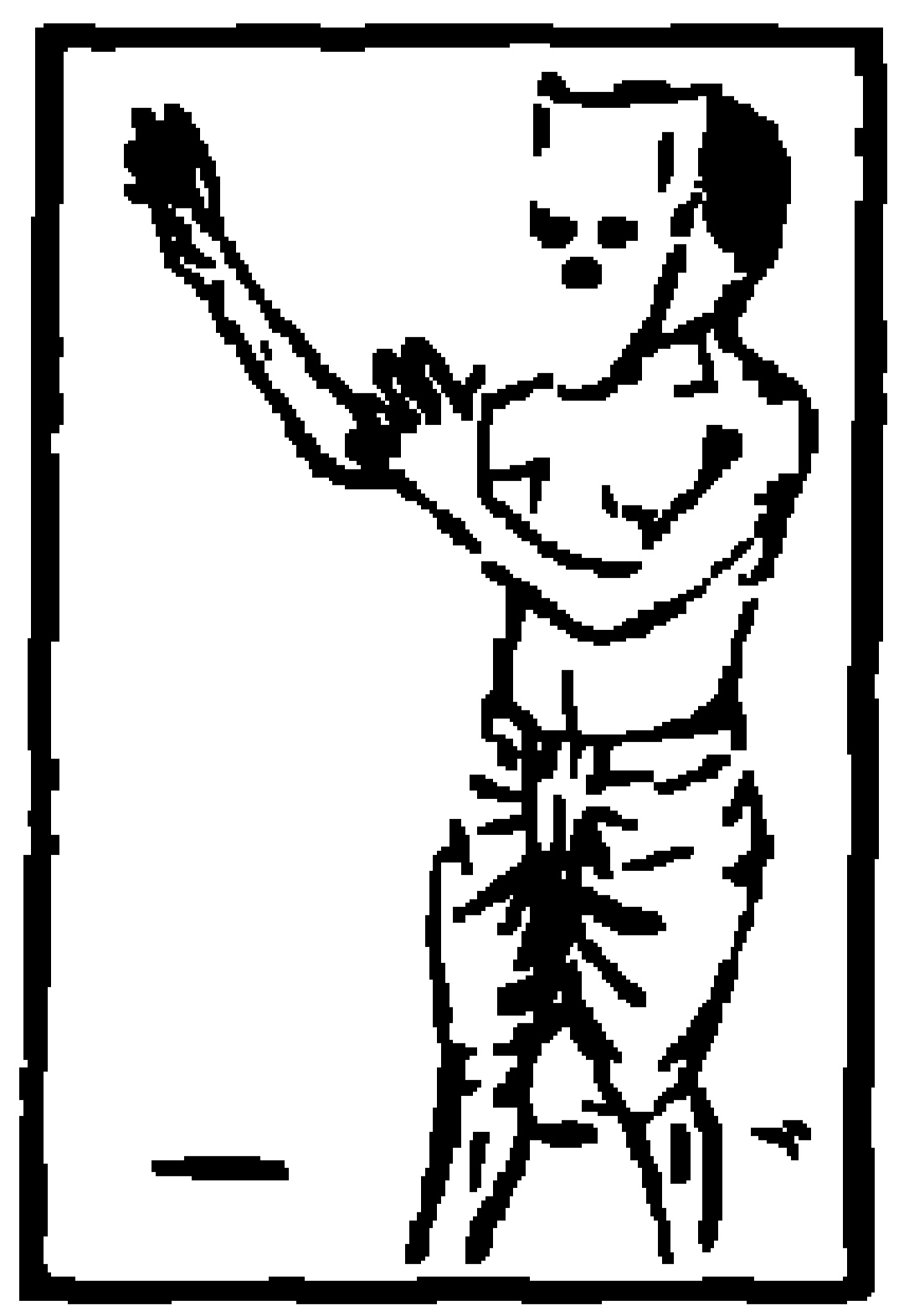
Playing traditional Meitei face masks

=== Cheitek Kotpi ===
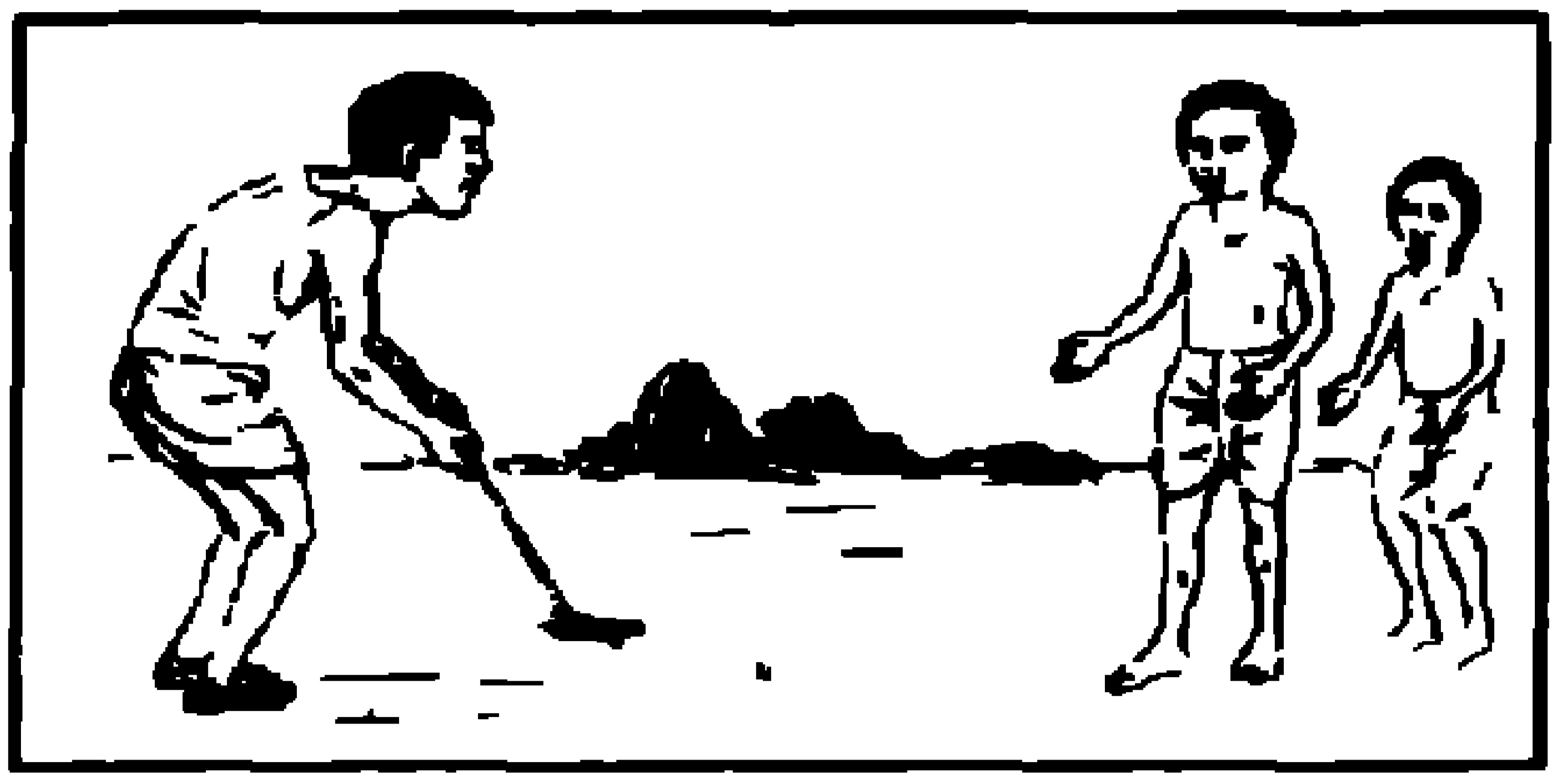
Playing Cheitek Kotpi

Cheitek Kotpi (ꯆꯩꯇꯦꯛ ꯀꯣꯠꯄꯤ) is a traditional Meitei children's game in which a player uses a bamboo stick to scoop soil or dust from the ground and throw it at another person. If the targeted person is hit by the soil or dust, they are out of the game, and a new player replaces them.

=== Kaangkhin ===
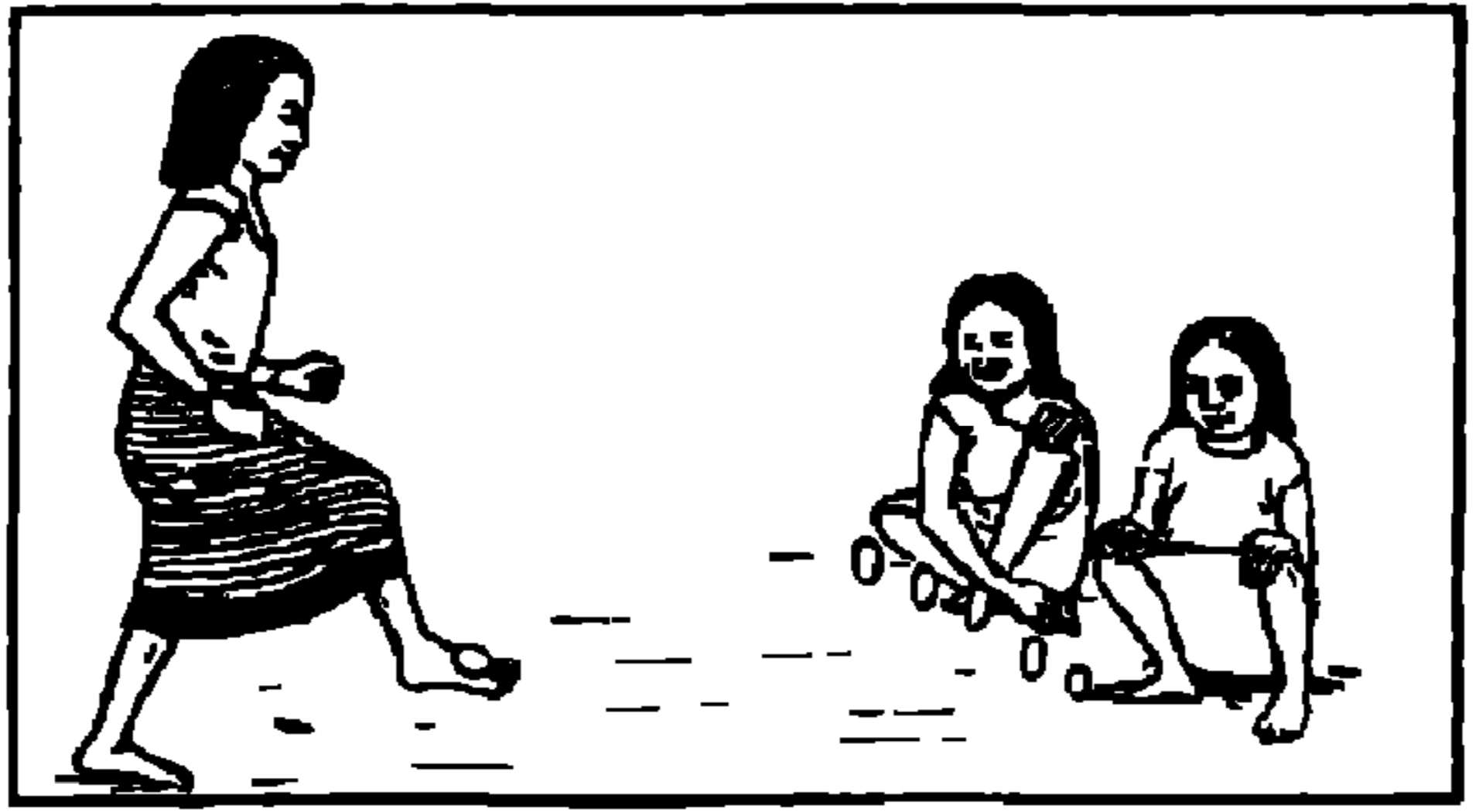
Playing with Kaangkhin seeds

Kaangkhin (ꯀꯥꯡꯈꯤꯟ) or Kaangkhil (ꯀꯥꯡꯈꯤꯜ) is a plant whose seeds are traditionally used in a Meitei children's game, especially by girls. In the game, a player places a Kaangkhin seed on the dorsal side of her foot and lifts that leg while jumping with the other leg to reach a destination. The player must not let the seed fall off her foot. At the destination, there are other Kaangkhin seeds already placed, and the goal is to hit those seeds by using her foot to throw her own Kaangkhin seed, without using her hands.

=== Khullokpi ===
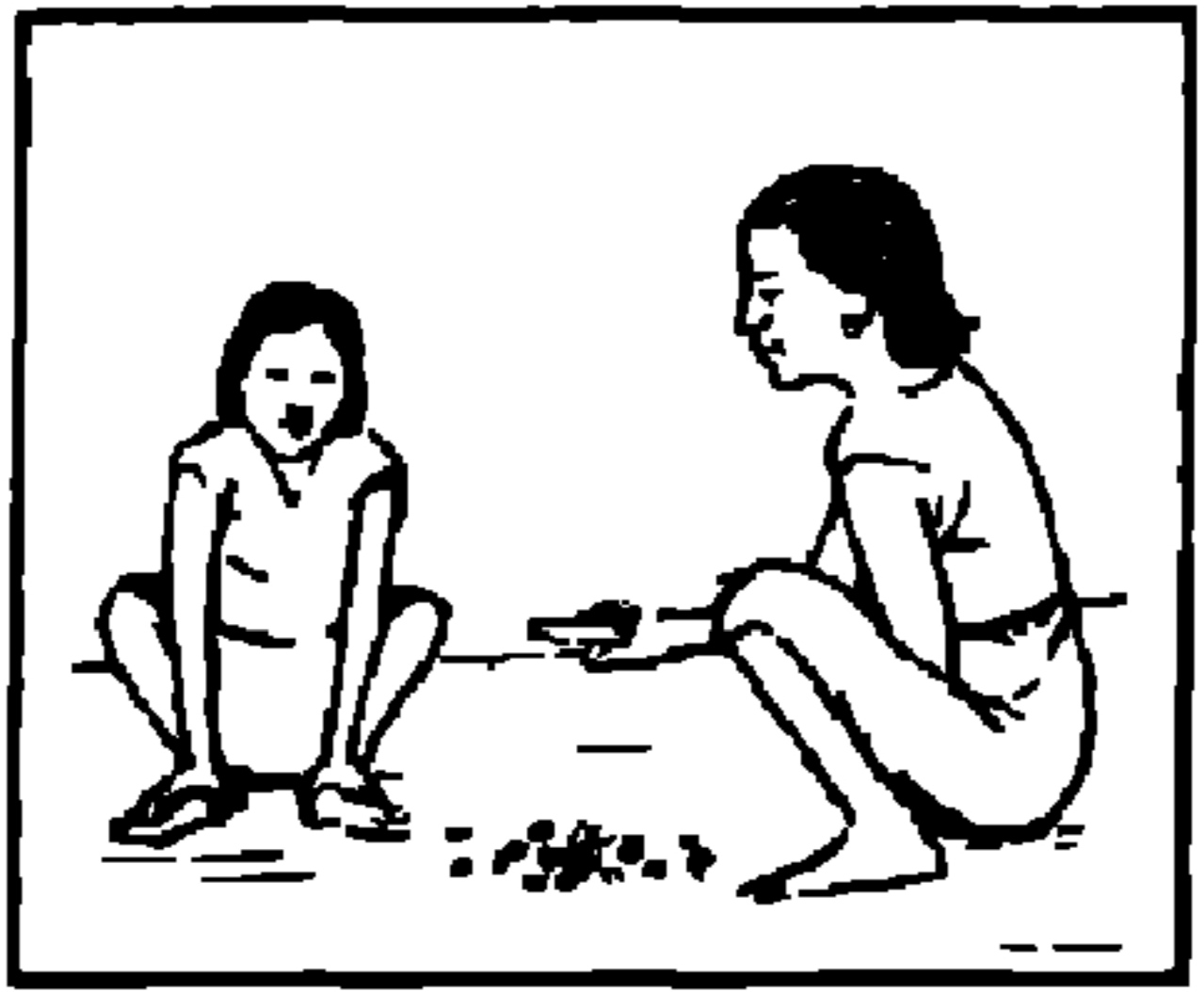
Playing Khullokpi

Khullokpi (ꯈꯨꯜꯂꯣꯛꯄꯤ) is a traditional Meitei children's game in which players gather small, durable objects like pebbles, brick fragments, or seeds. They place these objects on the dorsal side of their palm, throw them upwards, and then quickly turn their palm upwards to catch as many falling objects as possible before they hit the ground. The objects that are caught are used in the next round, and the process continues until all objects are used.

=== Marum Konbi ===
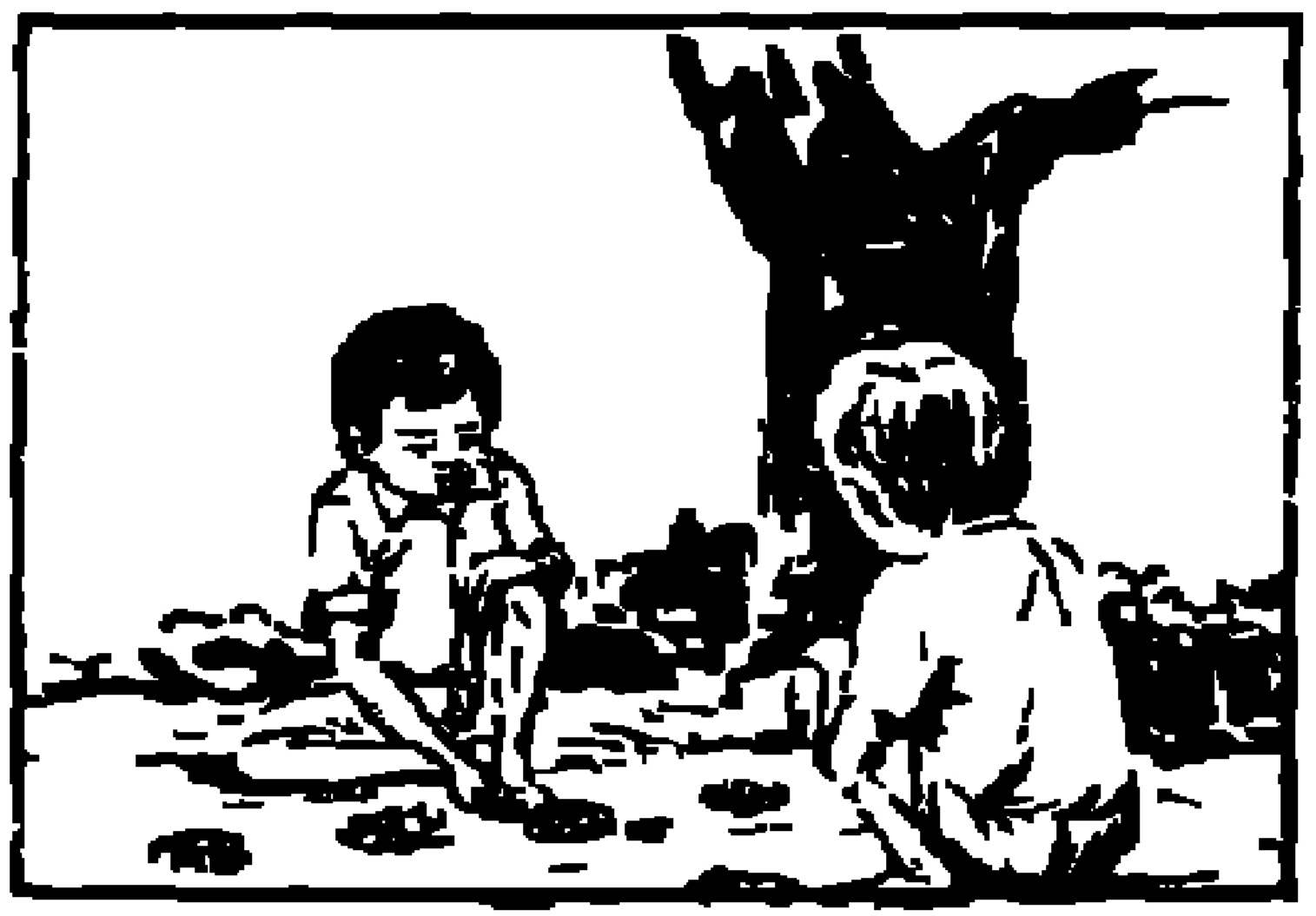
Playing Marum Konbi or incubation of supposed eggs

Marum Konbi (ꯃꯔꯨꯝ ꯀꯣꯟꯕꯤ) or Malum Konpi (ꯃꯂꯨꯝ ꯀꯣꯟꯄꯤ) is a traditional Meitei children's game where children simulate the incubation of eggs. They dig small ditches in the ground and use spherical or roughly round objects, such as marble balls, seeds, or other items, as "eggs" to be placed in the ditches.

=== Phibul Haabi ===
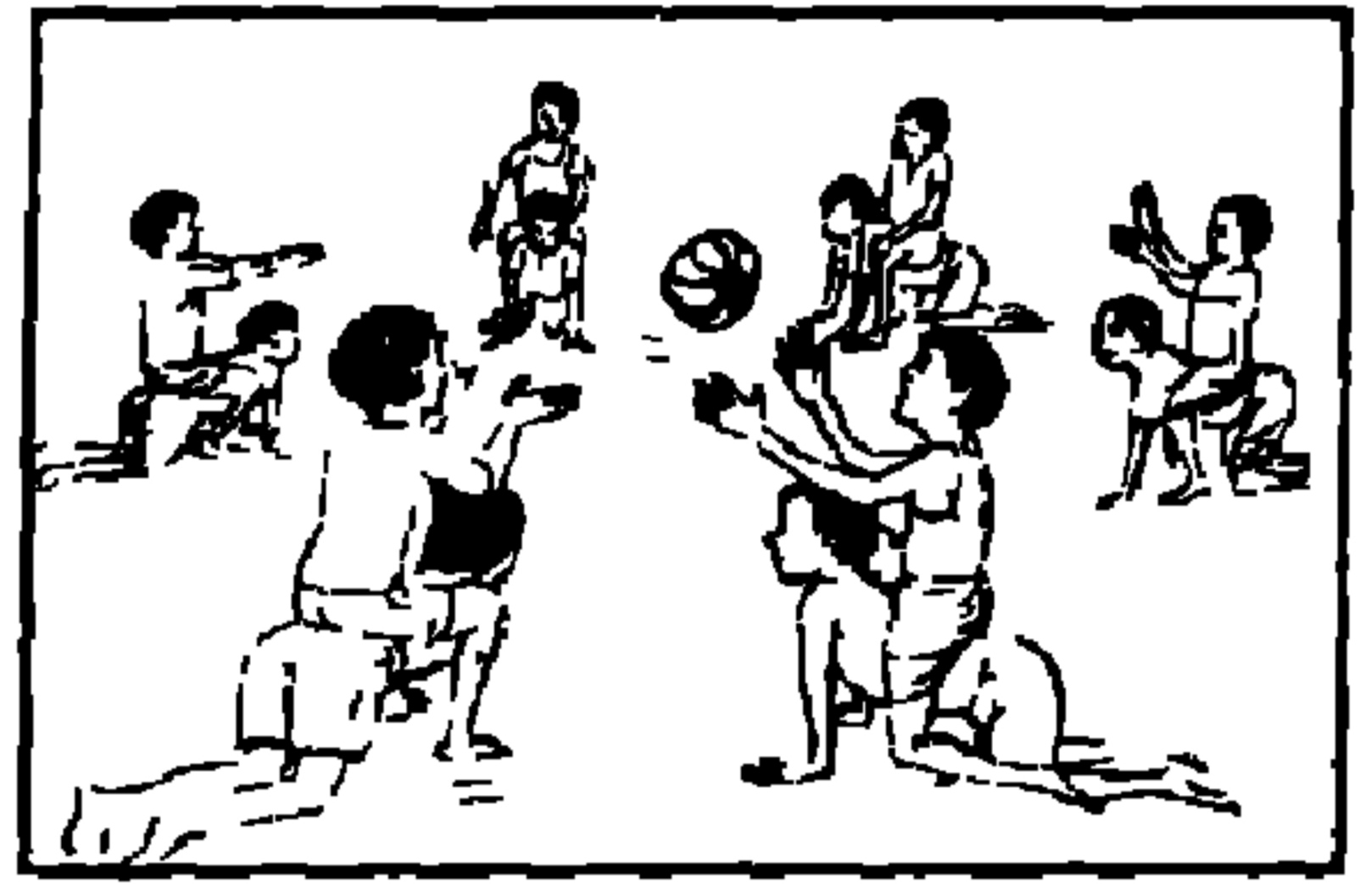
Playing Phibul Haabi

Phipul Haapi (ꯐꯤꯄꯨꯜ ꯍꯥꯄꯤ), or Phibul Haabi (ꯐꯤꯕꯨꯜ ꯍꯥꯕꯤ), is a traditional Meitei children's game open to both genders. In the game, one child acts as a horse while another becomes the rider, sitting on the horse’s back. Teams are formed, and the players create a large circle facing inward. They pass a large ball made from a pile of clothes, with one player throwing and another catching the ball. There are six horses and six riders, forming six pairs. The roles of horse and rider are swapped regularly. Team members cheer and encourage each other throughout the game. Unfortunately, this game is now nearly extinct and is no longer widely played.

=== Seboti ===
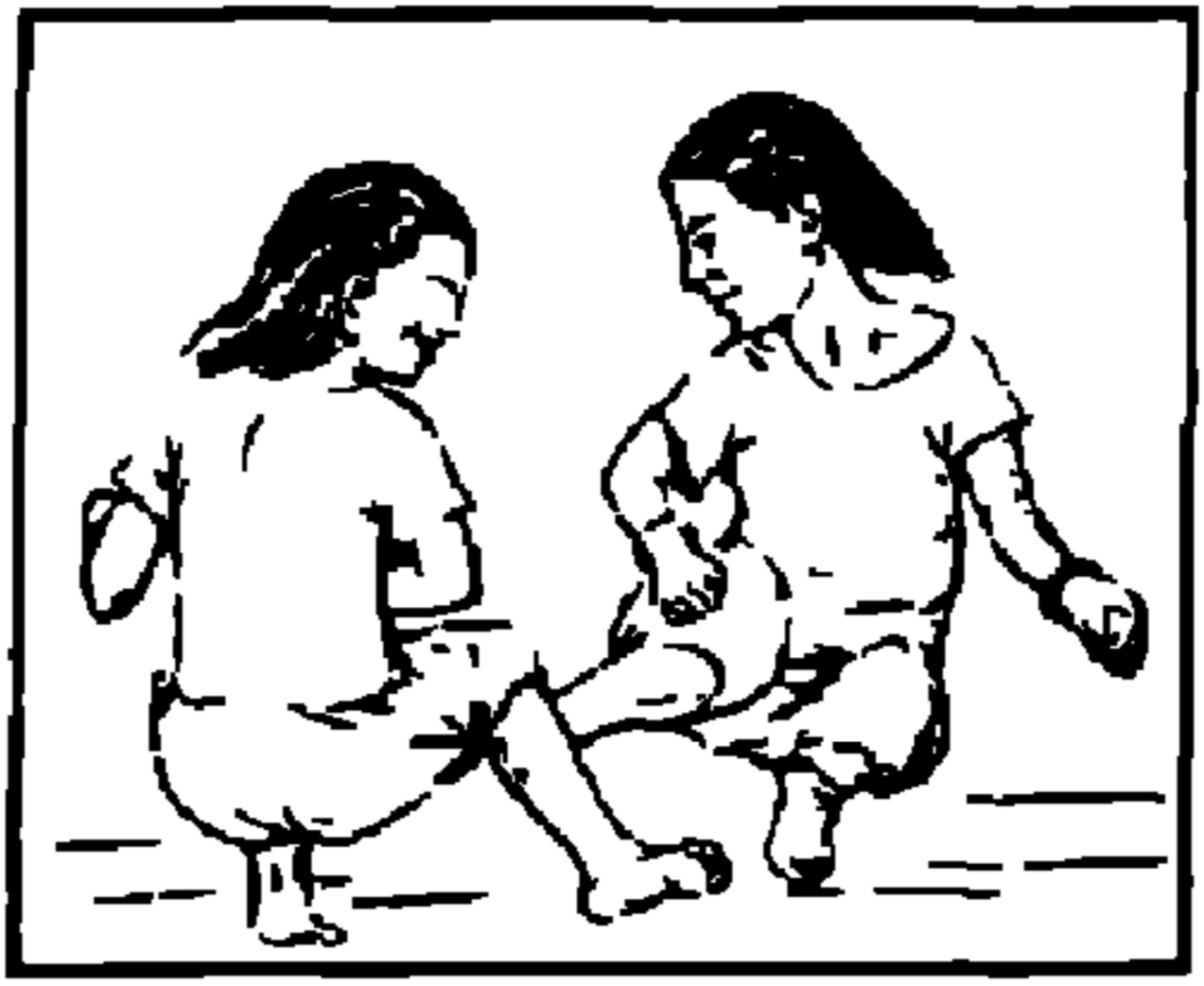
Playing Seboti

Sepoti Kaonapa (ꯁꯦꯄꯣꯇꯤ ꯀꯥꯎꯅꯄ), or Seboti Kaonaba (ꯁꯦꯕꯣꯇꯤ ꯀꯥꯎꯅꯕ), is a traditional Meitei children's game where two players squat and try to kick their opponent as long as possible. The game is typically played by one pair of players, but can involve up to 7 or 8 pairs of participants. The winner is the player who can kick the opponent for the longest duration while maintaining the squat position.

=== Yen Kaonabi ===
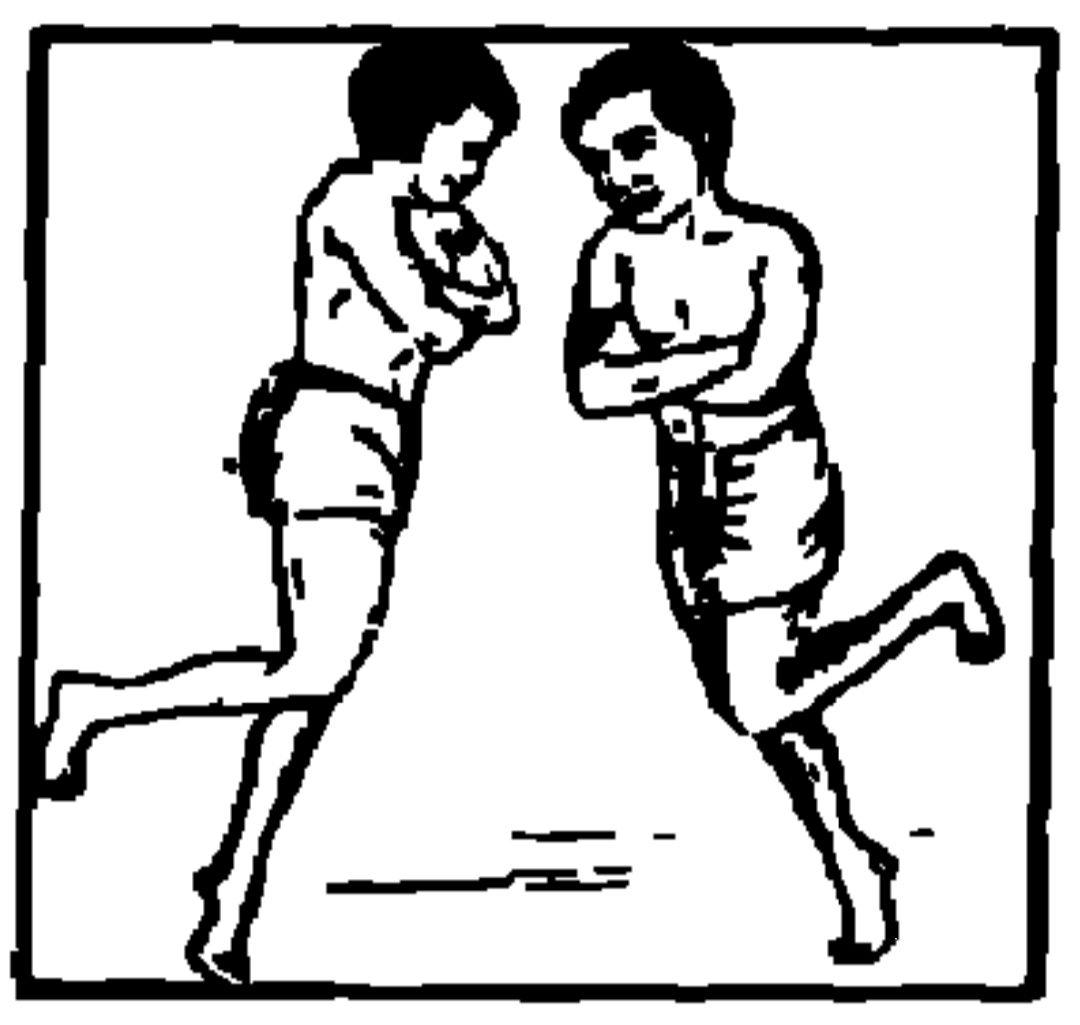
Playing Yen Kaonabi

Yen Kaonabi (ꯌꯦꯟ ꯀꯥꯎꯅꯕꯤ) or Yen Kaonapi (ꯌꯦꯟ ꯀꯥꯎꯅꯄꯤ) is a traditional Meitei children's game where two boys play the roles of "cock/rooster fighting." The players fold their arms, raise one leg, and hop to push the opponent to the ground.

== Related pages ==
- Meitei traditional weapons
- Meitei martial arts
- Meitei festivals
- Meitei people in Bangladesh
- Meitei people in Myanmar
- Traditional games of South Asia
- Traditional games of India
- Traditional games of Bangladesh
- Indian physical culture
- Sport in South Asia
