= Konthoujam Lairembi Stone Inscription =

Meitei language stone inscription

- Old Manipuri: Konthoucham Lailempi Lailik Eepa Nungpaak; Meitei: Konthoujam Lairembi Lairik Eeba Nungpaak
- Material: Sandstone
- Writing: Meitei script
- Created: written in 2 different eras first writings : c. 1592 AD-1652 AD second writings : c. 1697 AD-1709 AD
- Discovered: Konthoujam Tampha Lairembi sacred site, Konthoujam village, south of the National Highway No. 53 in the west of Imphal city, Imphal West district, Manipur
- Present location: Konthoujam Tampha Lairembi sacred site, Konthoujam village, south of the National Highway No. 53 in the west of Imphal city, Imphal West district, Manipur
- Culture: Meitei culture

The Konthoujam Lairembi Stone Inscription Meitei: Konthoujam Lairembi Lairik Eeba Nungpaak) or Konthoujam Lairemma Stone Inscription (Old Manipuri: Konthoucham Lailemma Khut-ee Nungpak; Meitei: Konthoujam Lairemma Khut-ee Nungpak) is a Meitei language stone inscription found in a sacred site dedicated to Goddess Konthoujam Tampha Lairembi of Sanamahism (Meitei religion) in Konthoujam village of Manipur.

== Description ==
The stone inscription is in the sacred temple complex of Goddess Konthoujam Tampha Lairembi (Old Manipuri: Konthoucham Tampha Lailempi) in the Konthoujam village. It is on the south of the National Highway No. 53 in the west of Imphal city. The stone engaged in this inscription is the sandstone. The inscription consists of 14 lines of writings in Meitei language (Manipuri language) in archaic Meetei script. Notably, the writings from the fifth to the seventh lines were highly damaged and distorted. So, proper study on these particular lines has been very hard and unsuccessful.

== History ==
It does not mention any particular date. But paleographic study confirmed that it was written in two different times. The first seven lines were carved in the time of King Khagemba (1592 AD-1652 AD). The remaining seven lines were added in the time of King Charairongba (1697 AD-1709 AD).

== Reading ==
The inscription shows that King Khagemba assigned compulsory state duty for the Konthoujam clan to worship goddess Huimu Leima. Notably, the Loyumba Shinyen Constitution also assigned the Konthoujam clan to look after the worship of Goddess Huimu Leima, and not Konthousu (Tampha Lairembi). And according to the Konthoujam Nongarol (Old Manipuri: Konthoucham Nongkalol), Goddess Huimu Leima is the mother of goddess Konthoujam Tampha Lairembi (Chingphulon Konthousu), the one married Salailen (Soraren), the king of heaven.
