= Laiphadibi =

Dolls in Meitei culture

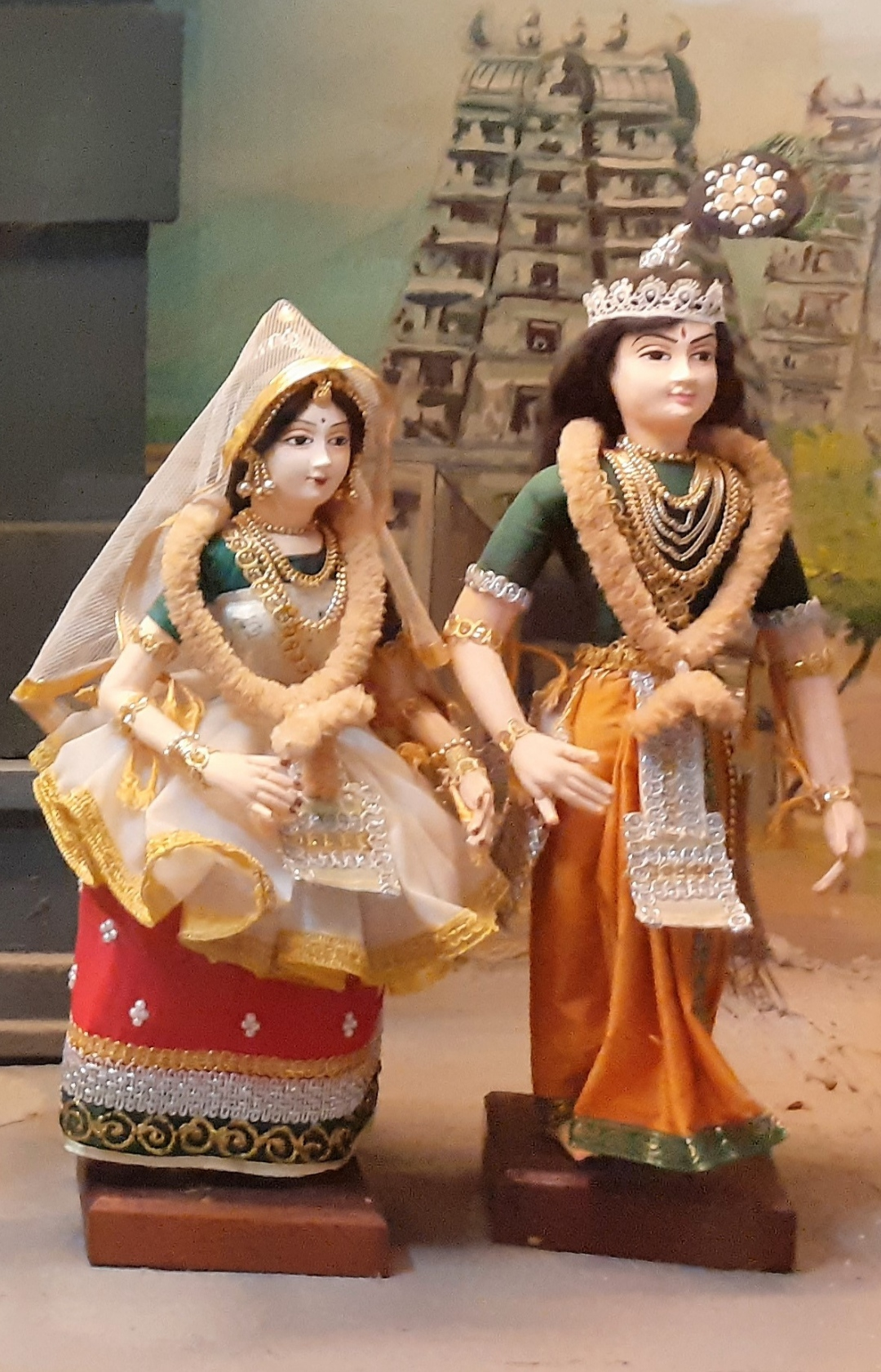
Special kinds of traditional Meitei dolls of Hindu gods (Radha and Krishna) in the Chennai museum

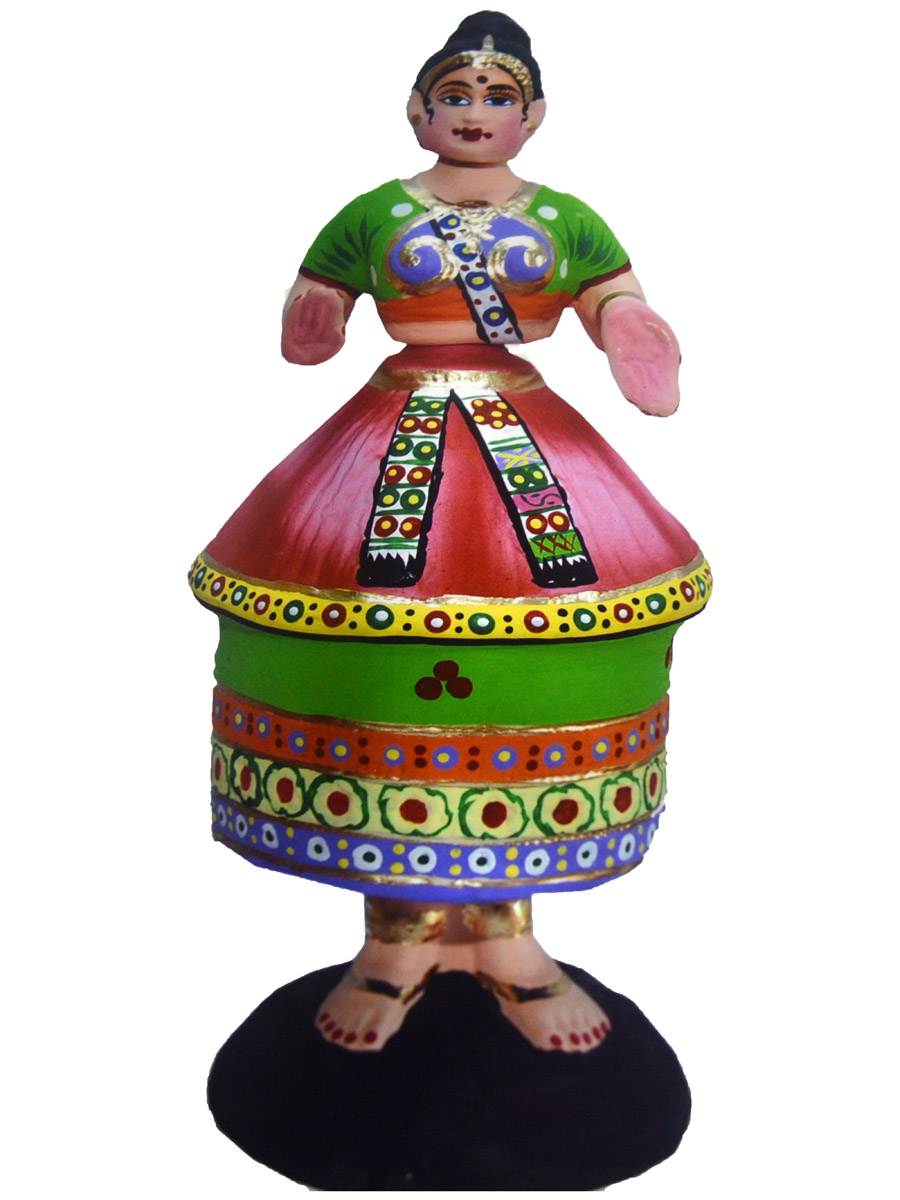
A special type of traditional Meitei doll of a Manipuri dancer in Tanjore

Laiphadibi (), also known as Laiphadabi (ꯂꯥꯏꯐꯗꯕꯤ) or Laidhibi (ꯂꯥꯏꯙꯤꯕꯤ) or Laidhabi (ꯂꯥꯏꯙꯕꯤ) or Laidhi (ꯂꯥꯏꯙꯤ), refers to the traditional Meitei handmade dolls, usually made of clothes and straws. It is one of the masterpieces of the Meitei handicrafts. These dolls play crucial roles in different elements of Meitei culture, including but not limited to Meitei dances, Meitei festivals, Meitei folklore, Meitei folktales, Meitei history, Meitei literature, Meitei mythology, Meitei proverbs, traditional Meitei religion (Sanamahism), etc.

These traditional Meitei dolls, or laidhibi, start as toys but also become an important part of rituals. They are treated as if they are living spirits, with own feelings, referring to them as ‘Ita’ (ꯏꯇꯥ), which means ‘a female companion’.

The laidhibi dolls has changed a lot since it was first made from old clothes. The early versions sold commercially wore tonga-phanek and lai-phi (clothes meant for the gods). Later, dolls wore simple potloi without decorations. Now, dolls in the market often copy the costumes and jewelry from the raslila dance. The simple doll has evolved into a much more detailed one, wearing potloi and boswan.

The Koktumbi dolls, with a thin, transparent veil, are especially popular with tourists visiting Manipur. These dolls have a conical cap on their head instead of hair or other decorations. They are unique and became well-known because of the raslila dance.

When the British people came to Manipur in the late 19th century, they discovered the local handicrafts, and traditional Meitei dolls were some of the first items they took back. Over time, the doll changed from being an important part of religious rituals and toys for children into a showpiece and souvenir.

Popular dolls are made based on characters like Khamba and Thoibi, the famous lovers from Meitei stories, Sandrembi and Chaisra, the good and evil sisters from Meitei folktales, and Radha and Krishna, the eternal lovers from the raslila in Hinduism. There are also dolls representing different ethnic communities of Manipur, bride and groom dolls, goddesses, fishing women, and even Disney princesses like Cinderella.

== Etymology ==
The word for doll in the Meitei language is Laiphadibi (ꯂꯥꯏꯐꯗꯤꯕꯤ). The word "lai" (ꯂꯥꯏ) means god, and "phadi" (ꯐꯗꯤ) means a shabby piece of cloth. The last part, "bi," (ꯕꯤ) shows that it’s feminine. So, Laiphadibi or a doll is a female image of a god made from old clothes.

== In ancient texts ==
The ancient Meitei text Leisemlol Sai-on-ba (ꯂꯩꯁꯦꯝꯂꯣꯟ ꯁꯥꯏꯑꯣꯟꯕ) talks about how dolls are made and used both in rituals and as toys. The dolls are an important part of some rituals.

== Uses ==
The children, mostly girls, would gather at a friend's porch with their dolls and accessories. They had many things for their dolls, like phanek (a long piece of cloth), phi (a shawl), beds, sofas, and sometimes even kitchen items. These were made by hand using cloth, mud, and leftover wood, and kept in a lubak (bamboo basket). After playing, the dolls were put to sleep, covered with a blanket inside the lubak. If the dolls were left out and not taken care of, the elders would warn, "If you don’t put your dolls back in the lubak after playing, they will cry at night under the banana trees." This was something no child wanted to happen.

=== Ending the relationship ===
When the child grew up and stopped playing with the laidhibi, it was time to say goodbye. The laidhibi wasn’t thrown away, but given to a younger sibling or buried under a banana tree. It was important to end the connection properly.

=== Need to respect ===
Today, children have more dolls than they can play with. The dolls are often thrown around, losing their arms or heads, which makes adults scold the child for being careless and unkind. This happens because people believe that laidhibis are living spirits and should be treated with respect.

== Appearances and materials ==
In the past, children or their elders made laidhibi at home for everyday play, using old clothes or pieces of cloth from local tailors. The laidhibi usually didn't have any facial features. Instead, a colorful thread running vertically across the face was used to show their face.

The dolls made by professionals have clear features. Their faces are mostly round, possibly because round faces are seen as the most beautiful. The eyes and eyebrows are stitched with black thread, which is also used for the hair, and the nose and lips are sewn with red. The face is made of plain white cloth, and the head is filled with rags. The arms and body of the doll are made of straw. These dolls don’t have legs and stand on their potloi (decorative lower dress).

To make a laidhibi, one needs cloth in different materials and colors—plain white cotton for the face, velvet for the blouse, bright-colored fabric for the potloi (lower dress), colorful beads and shiny sequins for decoration, zari fabric for the boswan (flared cloth around the waist), net or see-through material for the veil, laces, and jewelry. One also needs needles, threads, metal wires, glue, a stapler, and scissors. Old cardboard boxes, bought in bulk, are used to make the base for the potloi. If the client is willing to pay more, the potloi can be made from rubber, which is stronger.

The dolls' heads are stuffed with rags, and their hands and bodies are made of straw. The dolls can be decorated differently based on what the client wants and how much they are willing to pay. Making the eyes is the hardest part because they need to look the same. The eyes, eyebrows, nose, and mouth are sewn onto the face. The hair is made separately and then attached to the head. After the body is finished, the makers dress the dolls in potloi, which is decorated with beads and lace. The laidhibis, where the decorations are glued or stapled, are cheaper than those where the decorations are sewn.

Next, the boswan is sewn around the waist so that it sticks out. The necklaces, earrings, and veil are also made by threading them onto the doll.

Unlike the regular dolls, the ones used in rituals and religious purposes don't have faces or hair, and they don't wear colorful clothes. They are made from plain white cloth. These rules go back to a time when there were no needles or decorations, and they have stayed the same for many centuries.

== In lores ==
"If you don't put your laiphadibi back in the lubak (bamboo basket) after playing, they will cry at night under the banana plants."

This was a scary thought for children in Meitei society. Elders would often use this warning whenever children left their dolls scattered after playing.

=== Meitei folktale ===
There is a popular Meitei folktale in Manipur called ‘Ita Laiphadibee’ (ꯏꯇꯥ ꯂꯥꯏꯐꯗꯤꯕꯤ) about a young girl who was very close to her laidhibi. When she became old enough to marry and had to leave, both the girl and her laidhibi were sad. To show her gratitude for the girl’s love, the laidhibi granted her a wish: the ability to understand the language of animals.

On her wedding night, the girl heard a fox talking about a dead man floating in the river, wearing a magic ring. The fox said that whoever owned the ring would never have any problems in life. The girl decided to go look for the body, not knowing her husband was following her. The body had been in the water for a long time, and the fingers were swollen. The girl struggled to get the ring off, so she covered the finger with a cloth and pulled it off. Her husband, who secretly saw this, thought she was a witch and reported her to the king. The couple was summoned to the court. The husband refused to take her back, but before the king could make a decision, a crow started cawing from a nearby tree. The king asked the woman what the crow was saying. She told him that there was treasure buried under the tree, which turned out to be true.

The king married the woman, made her queen, and the kingdom thrived. The moral of the story is that laidhibis care for their human companions and, if treated with respect, can bring prosperity.

== In sociocultural practices ==
According to legends, if the traditional Meitei dolls or laiphadibis are placed at the entrance of a home, they protect the people inside and bring them wealth. This belief comes from the ancient Meitei mythology of the goddess Panthoibi (ꯄꯥꯟꯊꯣꯏꯕꯤ). The story says that some evil spirits tried to enter the goddess's house to kidnap a family member, but they were stopped by a figure that looked like both a human and a god at the entrance. The spirits were scared and left. The laidhibi had successfully scared them away, preventing harm to the family. Because of this, it is believed that the laidhibi protects homes, even when the people are not there.

That’s why, even after marriage, a woman cannot move her laidhibi from her parents' home until a month later. Meitei people in Manipur also hang these dolls on their vehicles, believing they help prevent accidents.

The dolls are an important part of certain rituals. If someone dies on Thursday, nongmapanba (the first day of the month according to the lunar calendar), or tatnaba (unlucky days), two dolls are placed on the grave after the funeral. The shaman gives the dolls two different tasks—to open the door for the living and to close the door for the dead. It is believed that if this is not done, there will be more deaths in the family in a short time.

In religious rituals, a laidhibi is tied to the top of a flag before being offered to the god. In Meitei homes, the house-deities Sanamahi (ꯁꯅꯥꯃꯍꯤ) and Leimarel (ꯂꯩꯃꯔꯦꯜ) are placed under a thakan (a cloth roof where the deity sits), with four dolls at each corner to protect the directions. Dolls are also used in ushin-touba and chabanthaba (rituals where offerings are made to calm spirits and end sickness or bad events) and semjinba (a ritual similar to black magic, where spells are cast to harm or defeat someone).

Among the Lois, a section of Meitei people of Manipur, if an unmarried man dies, a female doll is placed in his coffin. If an unmarried woman dies, a male doll is placed in her coffin. The Loi people believe this gives the deceased person a companion in the afterlife.

== In market ==
The laidhibi is popular in the market. Many doll makers use plastic dolls and dress them in laidhibi clothes. They often change the dolls' blonde hair to black threads or put chandan (sandalwood) on their faces to make them look more local. They buy plain plastic dolls for 420 INR per dozen, but since each pack has two dolls, buying a dozen actually means getting 24 dolls.

Once the dolls are dressed as laidhibis, they are sold for 80 INR at wholesale and 100 INR at retail per doll. If the costume is more detailed, the price goes up to 150 INR, especially during festivals.

The original cloth dolls are more expensive. Sellers say plastic dolls are more popular because their colors don’t fade and they last longer. Cloth dolls are hand-stitched, so they can wear out and lose their eyes, nose, and lips.

In addition to regular markets, dolls are also sold at Meitei festivals like Meitei Cheiraoba (New Year), and Hindu festivals like Rath Yatra, Krishna Janmashtami, Radha Asthami, and Durga Puja. They are also sold at trade fairs, exhibitions, and tourism festivals organized by the government.

More and more people are buying laidhibi dolls as gifts for birthdays and other occasions. Some of this is because they want to support local producers.

== In popular culture ==
- Laiphadibi amei yum, a book translated by G.C. Tongbra
- Ita Laiphadibi (My Dear Doll): A Manipuri Folk Tale, a book
- Ema Laiphadibi (2010), a Meitei language movie

== See also ==
- Barbie

== Bibliography ==
- PANDEMIC AND ITS IMPACT ON TRADITIONAL DOLL SELLERS OF IMA MARKET: A CASE STUDY
- Indira, Khangembam. ‘Social Organisation and Religion among the Lois in Manipur.’ PhD thesis, JNU, 2013.
- Sharma, A. Chitreshwar. ‘The significance of Laiphadibee in Manipur Society.’ A paper written for a workshop on traditional dolls and toys of Manipur, 7 December 2007.
- Singh, Sanasam Birendra. Khut-heiba-Lak ta gi. Thokchom Ningon Sanasam Ongbi Radheshyam Devi, 2013.
