= Bindi (disambiguation) =

A bindi is a forehead decoration worn on the Indian subcontinent.

Bindi may also refer to:

- Bindi (name), a list of people with the surname or given name
- Bindii or bindi, the name of several plant species
- Bindi, a Groovy Girls fashion doll

== See also ==
- Bindiya (disambiguation)
- Bhindi, term for okra in Indic languages
- Bindy, a name
- Binddii, a 2025 Indian TV series
