= Belinda =

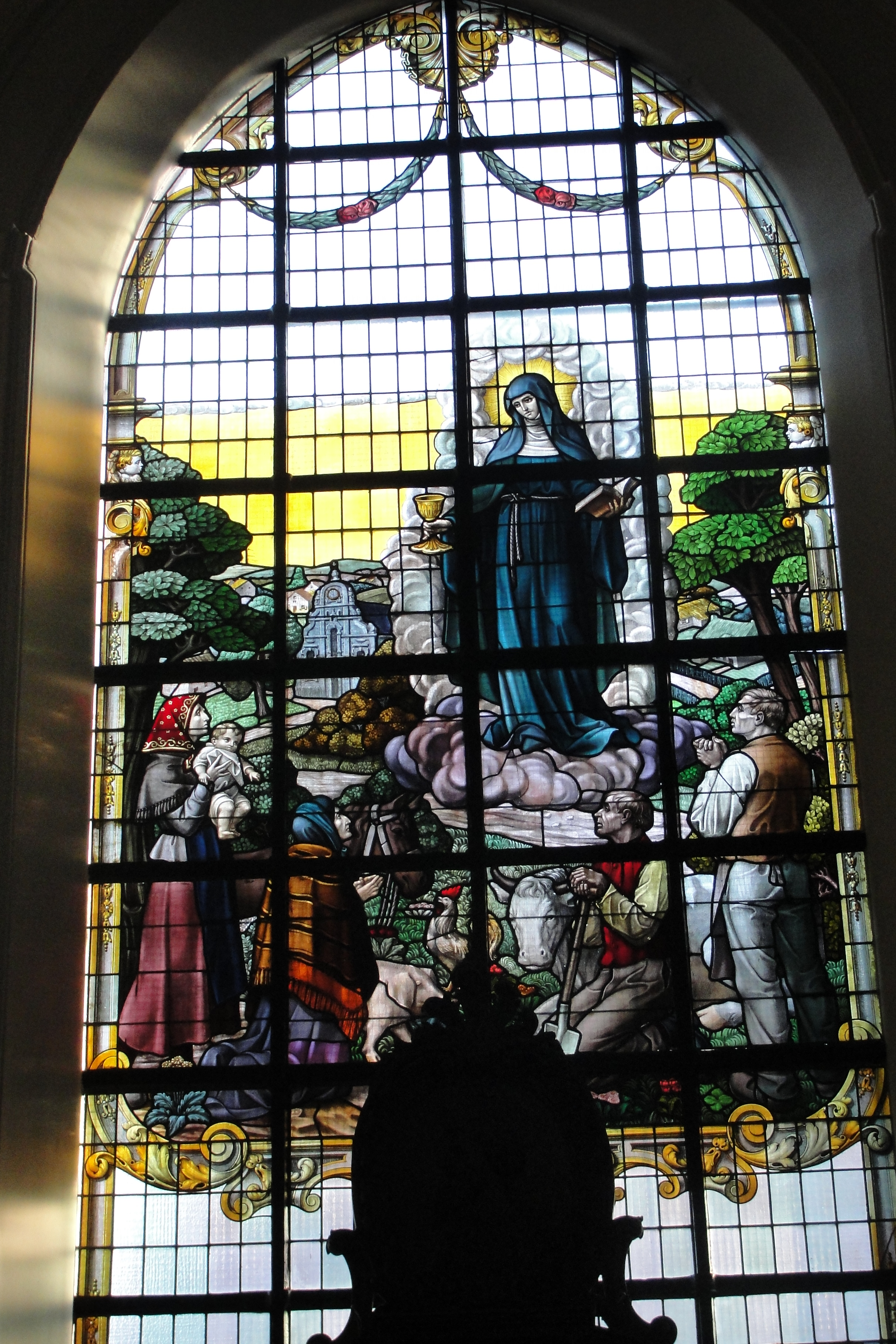
- Berlinda of Meerbeke
- Pronunciation: /bəˈlɪndə/
- Gender: Feminine

Origin
- Origin: Italian
- Meaning: Beautiful

Other names
- Related names: Bindy, Linda, Melinda

Belinda is a feminine given name of unknown origin, apparently coined from Italian bella, meaning "beautiful". Alternatively it may be derived from the Old High German name Betlinde, which possibly meant "bright serpent" or "bright linden tree".

== People ==
- Belinda C. Anderson (born 1954), American academic administrator
- Belinda Ang (born 1954), a judge of the Supreme Court of Singapore
- Belinda Bauer (actress) (born 1950), Australian actress
- Belinda Bauer (author) (born 1962), British writer
- Belinda Bencic (born 1997), Swiss tennis player
- Belinda Carlisle (born 1958), lead vocalist for the rock and roll band The Go-Go's and solo artist
- Bilinda Butcher (born 1961), vocalist and guitarist of the alternative rock band My Bloody Valentine
- Belinda Clark (born 1970), Australian former cricketer
- Belinda Cordwell (born 1965), former tennis player from New Zealand
- Belinda Cowling, Australian-born French medical researcher
- Belinda Effah (born 1989), Nigerian movie actress
- Belinda Emmett (1974–2006), Australian actress and singer
- Belinda Green (born 1952), Australian model
- Belinda Harris (born 1951), American politician
- Belinda Kirk, British entrepreneur and explorer
- Belinda Lima, American-born Cape Verdean singer also known simply as "Belinda"
- Belinda Mulrooney (1872–1967), Irish-American entrepreneur who made a fortune in the Klondike Gold Rush
- Belinda Neal (born 1963), former member of the Australian Senate (1994–1998) and House of Representatives (2007–2010)
- Belinda Noack (born 1977), Australian cricketer
- Belinda Peregrín, a Mexican singer and actress
- Belinda Snell (born 1981), Australian basketball player
- Belinda Stewart-Wilson (born 1971), English actress
- Belinda Stronach (born 1966), businessperson and former Member of Parliament in the Canadian House of Commons
- Belinda Sutton (c. 1712 – 1790), slave in colonial America, emancipated upon the death of her owner
- Belinda Vernon (born 1958), former Member of Parliament of New Zealand
- Belinda Wright (conservationist) (born 1953), wildlife photographer and wildlife conservationist in India
- Belinda Wright (dancer) (1929–2007), English ballerina
- Belinda Wright (softball) (born 1980), softball player from Australia

== Fictional characters ==
- Belinda, deaf-mute heroine of the play Johnny Belinda and various adaptations
- Belinda, heroine of Maria Edgeworth's novel Belinda* Belinda Blumenthal, main character of Rocky Flintstone's series Belinda Blinked
- Belinda, on the Canadian animated television show Mona the Vampire
- Belinda, a cow and the title character of a book by Pamela Allen
- Belinda Peacock (née Slater), a minor recurring character in EastEnders
- Belinda Chandra, companion of the Fifteenth Doctor in Doctor Who
