= Bindi (name) =

Bindi is both a surname and a given name. Notable people with the name include:

== Surname ==
- Clara Bindi (1927–2022), Italian actress
- Daisy Bindi (1904–1962), Australian Aboriginal activist
- Emanuele Bindi (born 1981), Italian cyclist
- Giacomo Bindi (born 1987), Italian footballer
- Rosy Bindi (born 1951), Italian politician
- Umberto Bindi (1932–2002), Italian singer-songwriter

== Given name ==
- Bindi Irwin (born 1998), Australian actress, television presenter, and daughter of wildlife conservationist Steve Irwin
- Bindi Kullar (born 1976), Canadian field hockey player
- Bindi Hindowa Samba, Sierra Leonean paramount chief

== See also ==
- Bindi
- Bindy
