= Leanne Leggieri =

Australian cricketer

Domestic team information
- Years: Team
- 1997/98: Victoria

Career statistics
| Competition | WLA |
|---|---|
| Matches | 2 |
| Runs scored | 8 |
| Batting average | 8.00 |
| 100s/50s | 0/0 |
| Top score | 7* |
| Balls bowled | 18 |
| Wickets | 0 |
| Bowling average | – |
| 5 wickets in innings | – |
| 10 wickets in match | – |
| Best bowling | – |
| Catches/stumpings | 3/– |
- Source: CricketArchive, 1 July 2021

Leanne Leggieri is a former Australian cricketer. She played two List A matches for Victoria during the 1997–98 season of the Women's National Cricket League (WNCL).
