= Jackie Boyce =

Australian cricketer

Domestic team information
- Years: Team
- 1997/98: Victoria

Career statistics
Competition	WLA
Matches	2
Runs scored	1
Batting average	–
100s/50s	0/0
Top score	1*
Balls bowled	120
Wickets	3
Bowling average	23.00
5 wickets in innings	0
10 wickets in match	0
Best bowling	3/35
Catches/stumpings	0/–
- Source: CricketArchive, 1 July 2021

Jackie Boyce is a former Australian cricketer. She played two List A matches for Victoria during the 1997–98 season of the Women's National Cricket League (WNCL).
