= Bindiya =

Bindiya may refer to:

- Bindi (decoration)
- Bindiya (film), a 1960 Indian Hindi-language drama film
- Bindiya (Pakistani actress) (born 1960), Pakistani actress and singer
- Bindiya (novel), a 1956 novel by Ramnath Pandey
- Bindiya, a character played by Swara Bhasker in the 2013 Indian film Raanjhanaa

== See also ==
- Bindi (disambiguation)
