= Third eye =

Spiritual concept

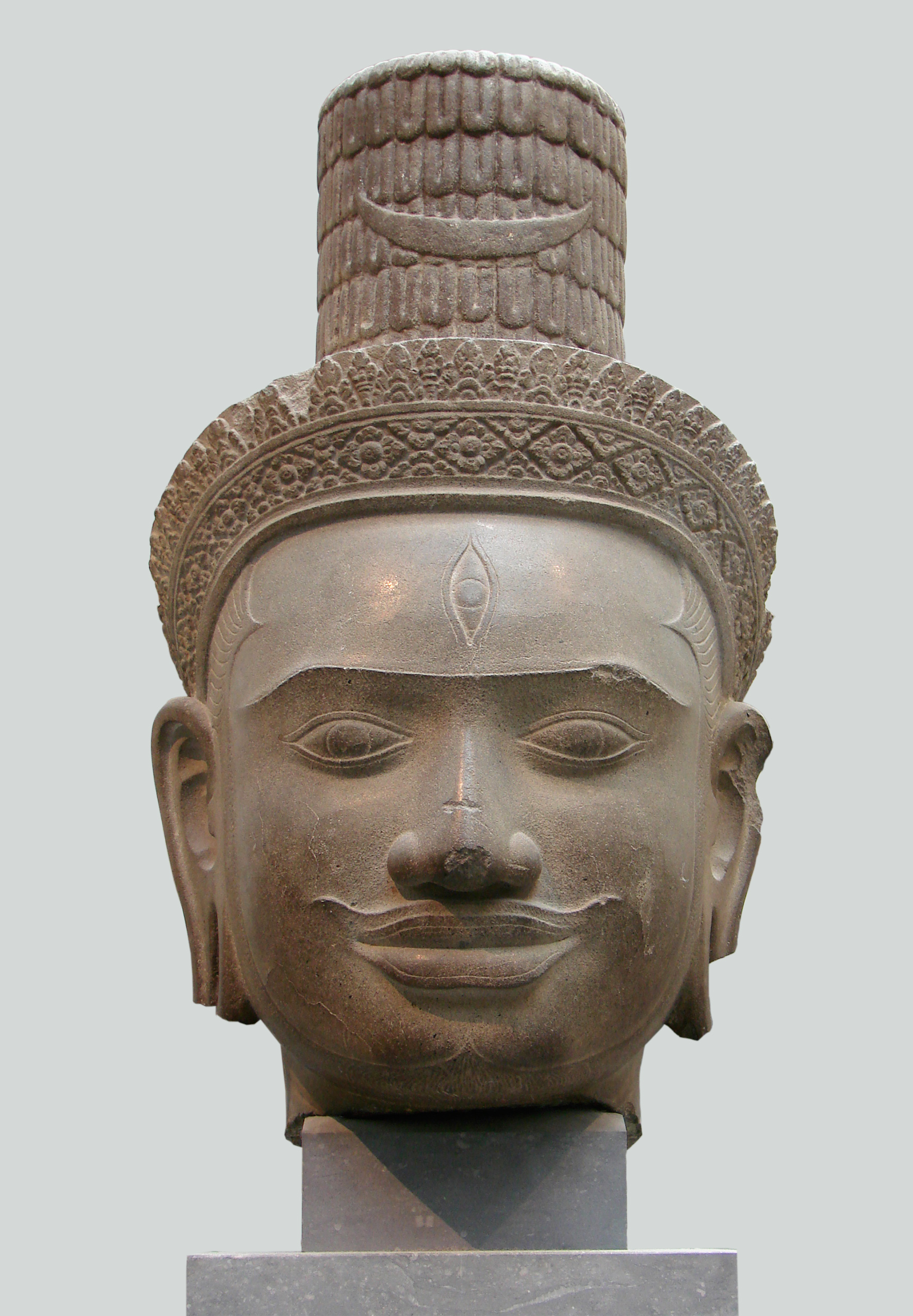
Shiva head showing a third eye

The third eye (also called the spiritual eye, mind's eye, or inner eye) is an intangible eye, usually depicted as located on the forehead, supposed to provide perception beyond ordinary sight. In Hinduism, the third eye refers to the ajna (or brow) chakra. In both Hinduism and Buddhism, the third eye is said to be located around the middle of the forehead, slightly above the junction of the eyebrows, representing the enlightenment one achieves through meditation.

Especially in Eastern spiritual practices, the third eye refers to the gate that leads to the inner realms and spaces of higher consciousness, and often symbolizes a state of enlightenment. The third eye is often associated with religious visions, clairvoyance, the ability to observe chakras and auras, precognition, and out-of-body experiences.

== In Hinduism ==
In Hinduism, the third eye refers to the ajna (or brow) chakra, said to be located around the middle of the forehead, slightly above the junction of the eyebrows. Hindus place a "tilaka" between the eyebrows as a representation of the third eye, which is also seen on expressions of Shiva. He is referred to as "Tryambaka Deva", or the three-eyed lord, where his third eye symbolizes the power of knowledge, and the detection of evil. His eye is depicted by three horizontal lines in the middle of his forehead.

== In Buddhism ==
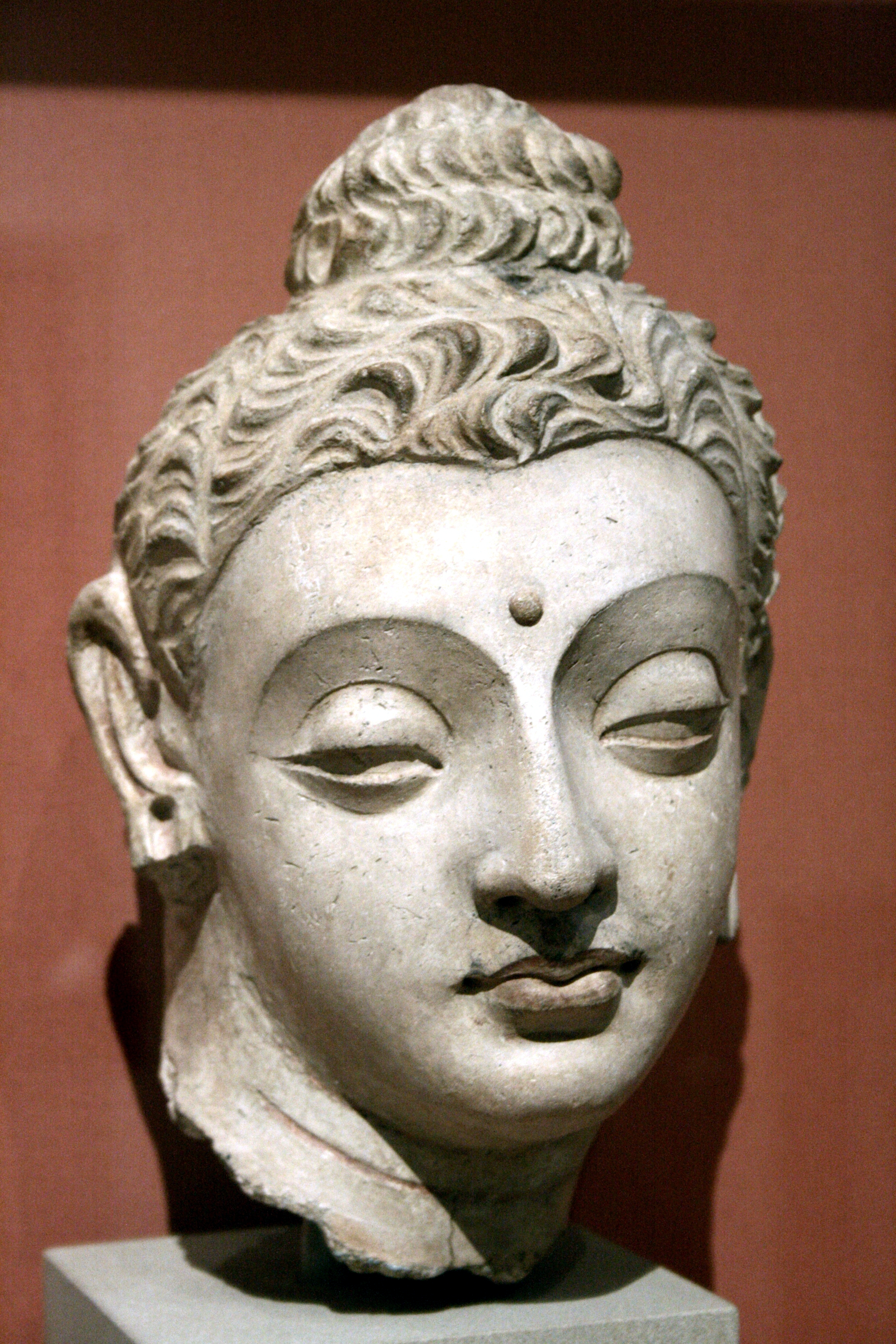
Buddha with an urna

In Buddhism, there is no widespread term that translates as "third eye". Nevertheless, there are two concepts which have thought to have similarities with this concept: the "divine eye" and the ūrṇā. In Buddhist doctrine, the “divine eye” (Sanskrit: divyacakṣus, Pāli: dibbacakkhu) is one of the supernormal knowledges (abhijñā) or higher cognitive faculties attainable through advanced meditative cultivation. It denotes a form of non-ordinary visual cognition that surpasses normal human sight, enabling the practitioner to perceive phenomena beyond sensory limits, such as distant objects, the divine realms, and the karmic destinies of sentient beings. In Mahāyāna contexts, the divine eye is often integrated into broader schemata of spiritual vision, such as the “five eyes” (pañca-cakṣūṃṣi), where it represents a level of insight superior to the physical eye but still subordinate to the Buddha’s omniscient wisdom-eye. It is not regarded as salvific in itself, but as an auxiliary capacity that supports wisdom, compassion, and pedagogical activity.

The ūrṇā is a distinctive physical mark located between the Buddha’s eyebrows and is counted among the thirty-two major marks (mahāpuruṣa-lakṣaṇa) of a great person. Classical descriptions portray it as a tuft or curl of fine white hair, sometimes said to emit rays of light that illuminate innumerable worlds, symbolizing the Buddha’s penetrating insight and beneficent influence. In iconography, the ūrṇā is frequently rendered as a small raised dot or spiral on the forehead, serving as a visual shorthand for the Buddha’s superhuman qualities rather than a literal anatomical feature. Textually and doctrinally, the ūrṇā functions as a corporeal sign of accumulated merit and perfected wisdom from past lives, reflecting the Buddhist view that the Buddha’s physical form is a karmically conditioned manifestation of past spiritual attainments. Unlike the divine eye, which is an inner meditative faculty that advanced practitioners may acquire, the ūrṇā is a physical feature unique to fully awakened Buddhas.

== In Taoism ==
In Taoism, third eye training involves focusing attention on the point between the eyebrows with the eyes closed, and while the body is in various qigong postures. The goal of this training is to allow students to tune into the correct "vibration" of the universe and gain a solid foundation on which to reach a more advanced meditative state. Taoism teaches that the third eye, also called the mind's eye, is situated between the two physical eyes, and expands up to the middle of the forehead when opened. Taoism asserts that the third eye is one of the main energy centers of the body located at the sixth Chakra, forming a part of the main meridian, the line separating left and right hemispheres of the body.

== In Theosophy ==
Adherents of theosophist H. P. Blavatsky have suggested that the third eye is in fact the partially dormant pineal gland, which resides between the two hemispheres of the brain. Reptiles and amphibians sense light via a third parietal eye—a structure associated with the pineal gland—which serves to regulate their circadian rhythms, and for navigation, as it can sense the polarization of light. She states that certain functions of the mind are associated with the pineal gland and the acervulus cerebri was absent in children below the age of six. C. W. Leadbeater thought that by extending an "etheric tube" from the third eye, it is possible to develop microscopic and telescopic vision. It has been asserted by Stephen Phillips that the third eye's microscopic vision is capable of observing objects as small as quarks. According to this belief, humans had in far ancient times an actual third eye in the back of the head with a physical and spiritual function. Over time, as humans evolved, this eye atrophied and sunk into what today is known as the pineal gland. Rick Strassman has hypothesized that the pineal gland, which maintains light sensitivity, is responsible for the production and release of DMT (dimethyltryptamine), an entheogen which he believes could be excreted in large quantities at the moments of birth and death.

== See also ==
- Bindi – Dot worn on the centre of the forehead
- Body of light – Hermetic starfire body
- Consciousness – Awareness of internal and external existence
- Erlang Shen – Deity in the Chinese pantheon
- Eye of Horus – Ancient Egyptian symbol of protection, royal power and good health
- Eye of Providence – Symbol
- History of the pineal gland – Scientific research on the pineal gland as the third eye
- Occult – Knowledge of the hidden or the paranormal
- Parietal eye – Part of the epithalamus
