= Huadian (make-up) =

Traditional Chinese forehead decoration`

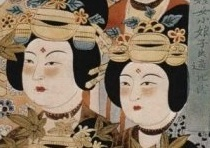
- Buddhist donors wearing huadian on the forehead and Tang dynasty clothing, Mokao Cave.
- Type: Traditional Chinese women's facial makeup
- Material: Diverse
- Place of origin: Spring and Autumn period and Warring States period, China

Huadian
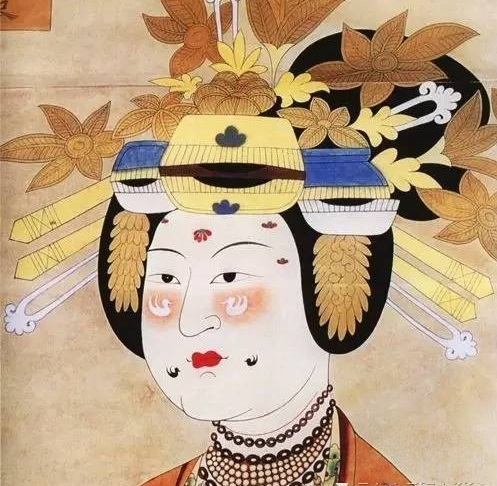
- Huadian applied on the forehead, dimples, temples, and cheeks of a Buddhist donor in Tang dynasty hanfu, from Mokao Cave.

Chinese name
- Traditional Chinese: 花鈿
- Simplified Chinese: 花钿
Transcriptions
Standard Mandarin
- Hanyu Pinyin: Huādiàn

Huazi
- Chinese: 花子
- Literal meaning: Little flower
Transcriptions
Standard Mandarin
- Hanyu Pinyin: Huāzǐ

English name
- English: Shouyang makeup/plum blossom makeup

Huadian (traditional Chinese: 花鈿; simplified Chinese: 花钿), also known as huazi (Chinese: 花子; lit. 'little flower'), mianhua (Chinese: 面花), meizi (Chinese: 媚子), plum blossom makeup or plum makeup (Chinese: 梅花妝; pinyin: méihuāzhuāng or Chinese: 落梅妝; pinyin: luòméizhuāng) or shouyang makeup (Chinese: 壽陽妝), is a form of traditional Chinese women's ornamental forehead makeup, which is located between the eyebrows and sometimes on the cheeks, the temples, and the dimples. According to folklore, the huadian in floral shape originated in the Southern dynasty period; its creation is attributed to Princess Shouyang, a daughter of Emperor Wu of Liu Song (420 – 479 AD). However, the origins of huadian can be traced back earlier than these legends to the Qin and Han dynasties, and even in the pre-Qin period with its customs arising as early as the Spring and Autumn period (c. 770 – 476 BC) and Warring States period (c. 475 – 221 BC) based on archaeological artifacts and studies. Its origins has no connection with the diandan (Chinese: 点丹; lit. 'cinnabar dot'), i.e. baihao (Chinese: 白毫), found on the middle of the forehead of Buddha statues. The huadian was also popular among Tang and Song dynasty women. The popularity of huadian declined in the Yuan dynasty. Huadian is an integral part of Chinese clothing culture. In present days, huadian is often combined with the wearing of hanfu, the traditional clothing of the Han Chinese.

== Designs and colours ==
Huadian come in various different shapes and patterns, including flowers, plum blossoms, butterfly, coins, peaches, birds, phoenixes and other animals. They are typically red in colour but can also be found in different colours, such as green and gold. Different materials such as emerald bird feathers or cuidian (Chinese: 翠鈿), gold leaf, silver leaf, paper, fish scales, feathers, pearls, jewels, or dragonfly wings can be used.

=== Application location ===
Huadian is typically applied on the forehead between the eyebrows; sometimes, it is applied on the cheeks, on the temples, and even on the dimples, where it was specifically referred to as mianye (Chinese: 面靨). Mianye were typically about 1 cm from each sides of the lips and were red in colour. During the prosperous period of the Tang dynasty and the Five Dynasties and Ten Kingdoms period, the mianye reached high up to the two sides of the nose.

== History ==
The customs of applying early prototypes of huadian can be traced back to the pre-Qin period; for example, female figurines unearthed from the tomb of Chu dating to the Warring States period in Changsha, Hunan province, have decorative shapes or patterns painted on their face, which shows that prototypes of huadian predate the folk legends of their origin.

=== Northern and Southern dynasties ===
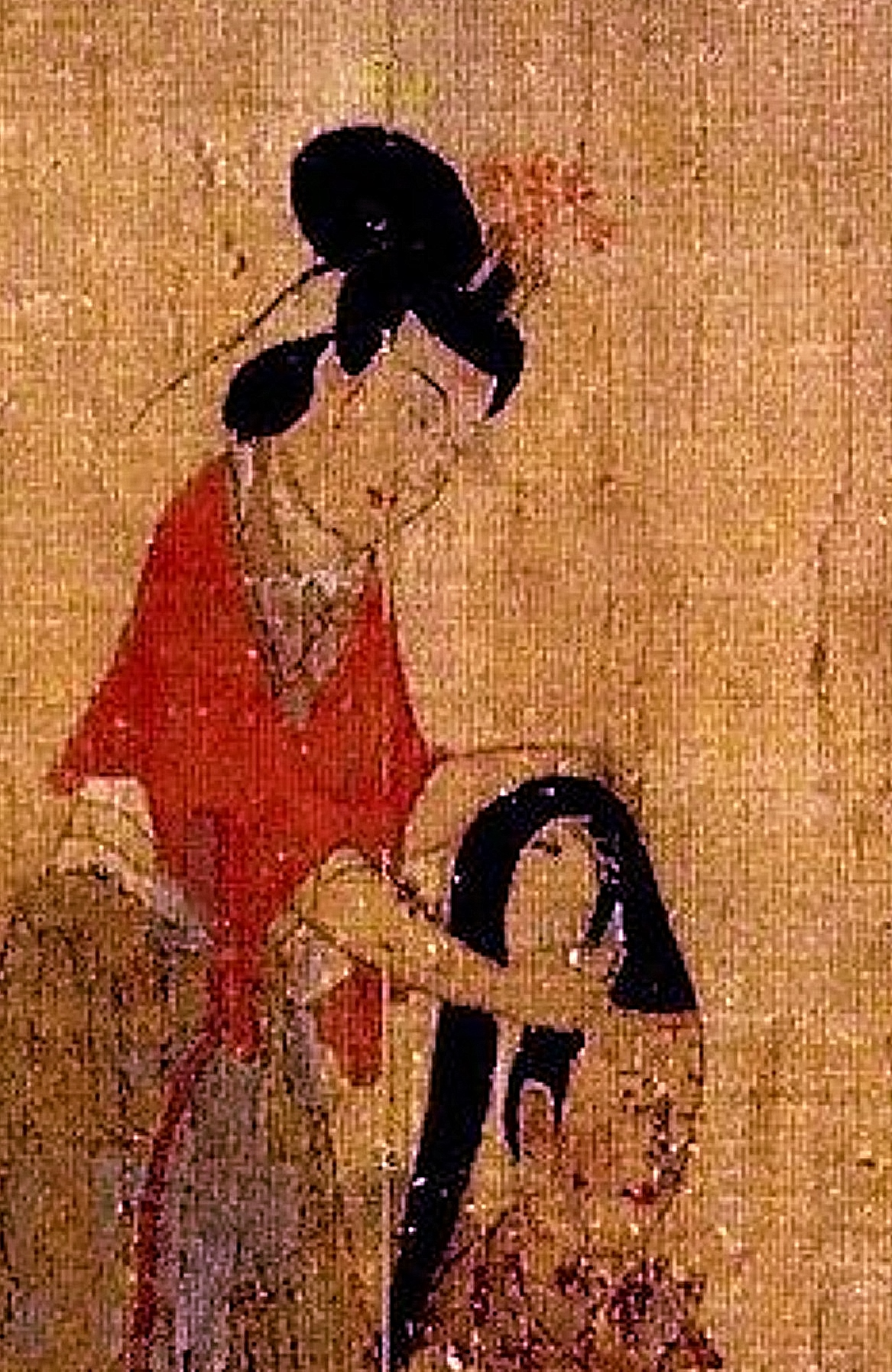
Women with huadian painted on forehead, from the painting Admonitions Scroll, attributed to Gu Kaizhi.

According to a legend, floral huadian originated in the Southern dynasty period when a plum blossom was blown onto the forehead of Princess Shouyang (a daughter of Song Wudi) when she was taking a walk in the palace in early spring. The plum blossom for some reason could not be removed or washed off; but since it looked beautiful on the princess, it became a fashion trend.

Another legend says that Princess Shouyang was taking a nap when a plum blossom fell on her forehead (and cheeks) leaving imprints; these imprints then lasted for three days. The effect of the flower imprint was so striking that it formed a new vogue and was copied by other ladies. This fashion trend soon became popular across the country.

=== Tang dynasty and Five Dynasties and Ten Kingdoms period ===
According to the Youyang zazu (酉陽雜俎), women in the Tang dynasty painted huazi (Chinese: 花子) on their face, which originated from Shangguan Wan'er. According to the Chinese folk legend, red plum blossom huadian became popular in the Tang dynasty under the influence of Shangguan Wan'er. Shangguan Wan'er had her face ruined by Wu Zetian with a scar on the forehead. To disguise it, she tattooed a red plum blossom around her scar and dyed it red, taking inspiration from the plum blossom makeup created by Princess Shouyang. In addition to covering her scar, the red plum blossom also made her look more beautiful and charming. The makeup became popular among both palace ladies and commoners, turning it into a representative makeup of the Tang dynasty. This became known as hongmei zhuang (Chinese: 紅梅妝; lit. 'red plum makeup').

In the Tang dynasty, huadian could also be painted or made of tiny pieces of metal, such as gold or silver foil. Other materials such as paper, fish scales or dragonfly wings were also used to make huadian. During this period, there were more than 10 variations of plum blossoms which were used as facial adornments. Bird, snake, and lead-shaped decorations were also popular.

During the prosperous period of the Tang dynasty and the Five Dynasties and Ten Kingdoms period, the mianye reached high up to the two sides of the nose, and they were shaped in the form of coins, peaches, birds, and flowers.

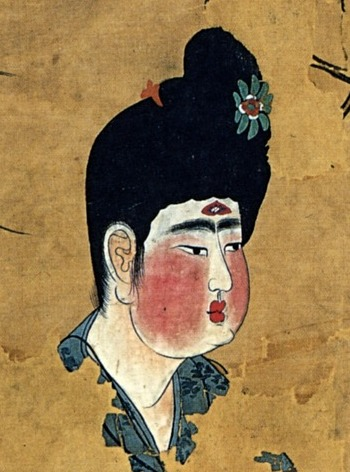
Courtesan with huadian on forehead, Tang dynasty

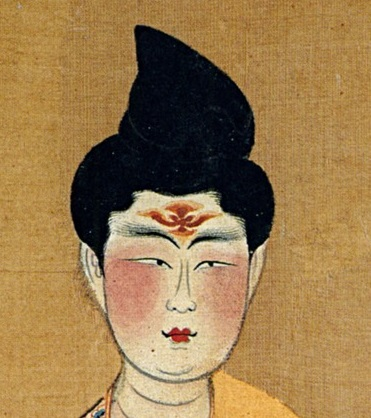
A Tang dynasty woman

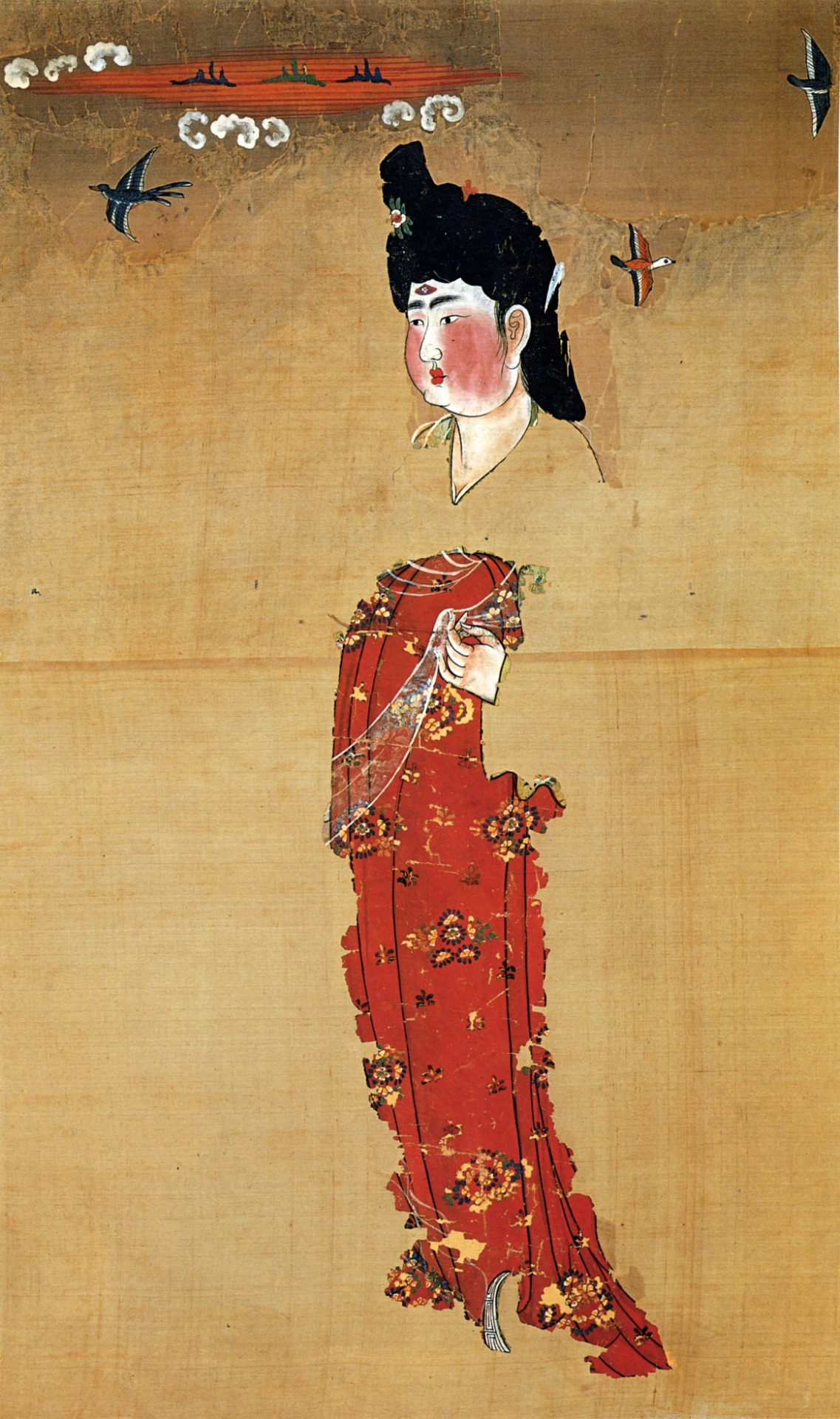
A Tang dynasty woman

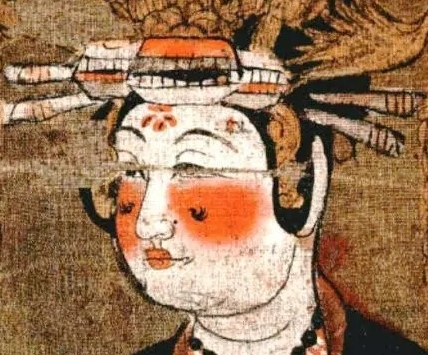
Woman wearing huadian on forehead and mianye, Five dynasties period.

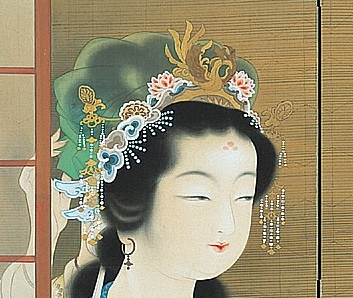
Tang era empress Yang Guifei with huadian

=== Song dynasty ===
In the Song dynasty, huadian embellished with pearls became popular.

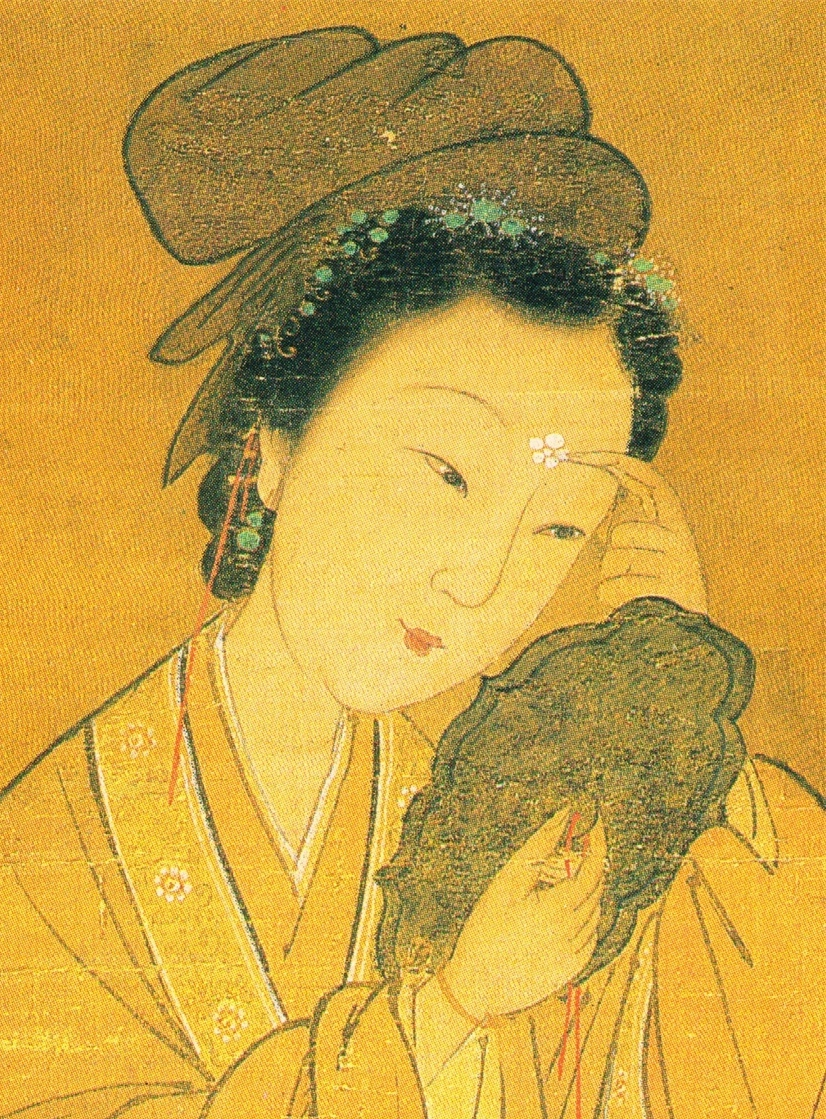
Woman applying huadian in the shape of a flower

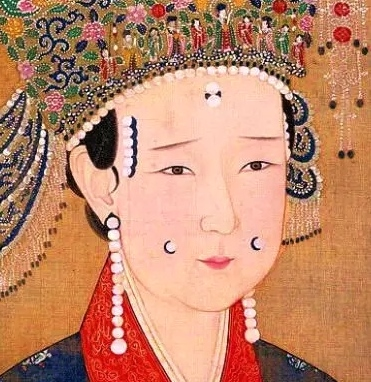
Song dynasty empress of Qinzong wearing pearl huadian

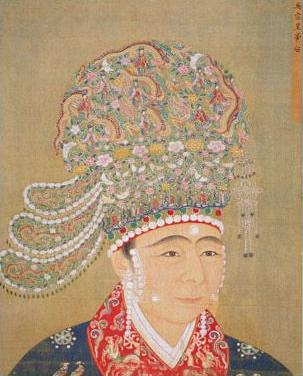
Empress of Yingzong wearing pearl huadian

== 21st century ==
In the 21st century, huadian typically do not appear on women's faces as daily makeup. However, traditional designs of huadian are still used in the designs of contemporary wedding accessories, and are depicted in many Chinese television dramas. Huadian is also used as a form of makeup for women when wearing hanfu. Nowadays, huadian can either be painted on the face or be applied as a temporary tattoo.

== See also ==
- Hanfu
- Hanfu accessories
- Paklei Namsa
