= Belinda Noack =

Australian cricketer (born 1977)

Personal information
- Born: 20 March 1977 (age 49); Adelaide, South Australia
- Batting: Right-handed
- Bowling: Right-arm fast-medium
- Role: Bowler

Domestic team information
- Years: Team
- 1997/98–2002/03: South Australia

Career statistics
Competition	WLA
Matches	43
Runs scored	9
Batting average	1.28
100s/50s	0/0
Top score	3
Balls bowled	1,408
Wickets	36
Bowling average	24.52
5 wickets in innings	0
10 wickets in match	0
Best bowling	4/4
Catches/stumpings	15/–
- Source: CricketArchive, 8 January 2022

Belinda Noack (born 20 March 1977) is a former Australian cricketer. A right-arm fast-medium bowler, she is also a right-handed batter. Born in Adelaide, South Australia, she represented her home state in 43 List A matches in the Women's National Cricket League (WNCL) between the 1997–98 and 2002–03 seasons.
