= Bindii =

Bindii, bindi (/bɪn.di/), bindyi or bindi-eye may refer to the following plant species:

- Soliva sessilis, also known as lawnweed, common soliva, and field burrweed
- Tribulus terrestris, also known as puncturevine, caltrop, cathead, goathead, and burra gokharu.
- Calotis hispidula, also known as Bogan flea.
- Alternanthera pungens, more commonly known as khaki weed.
Plants called bindii
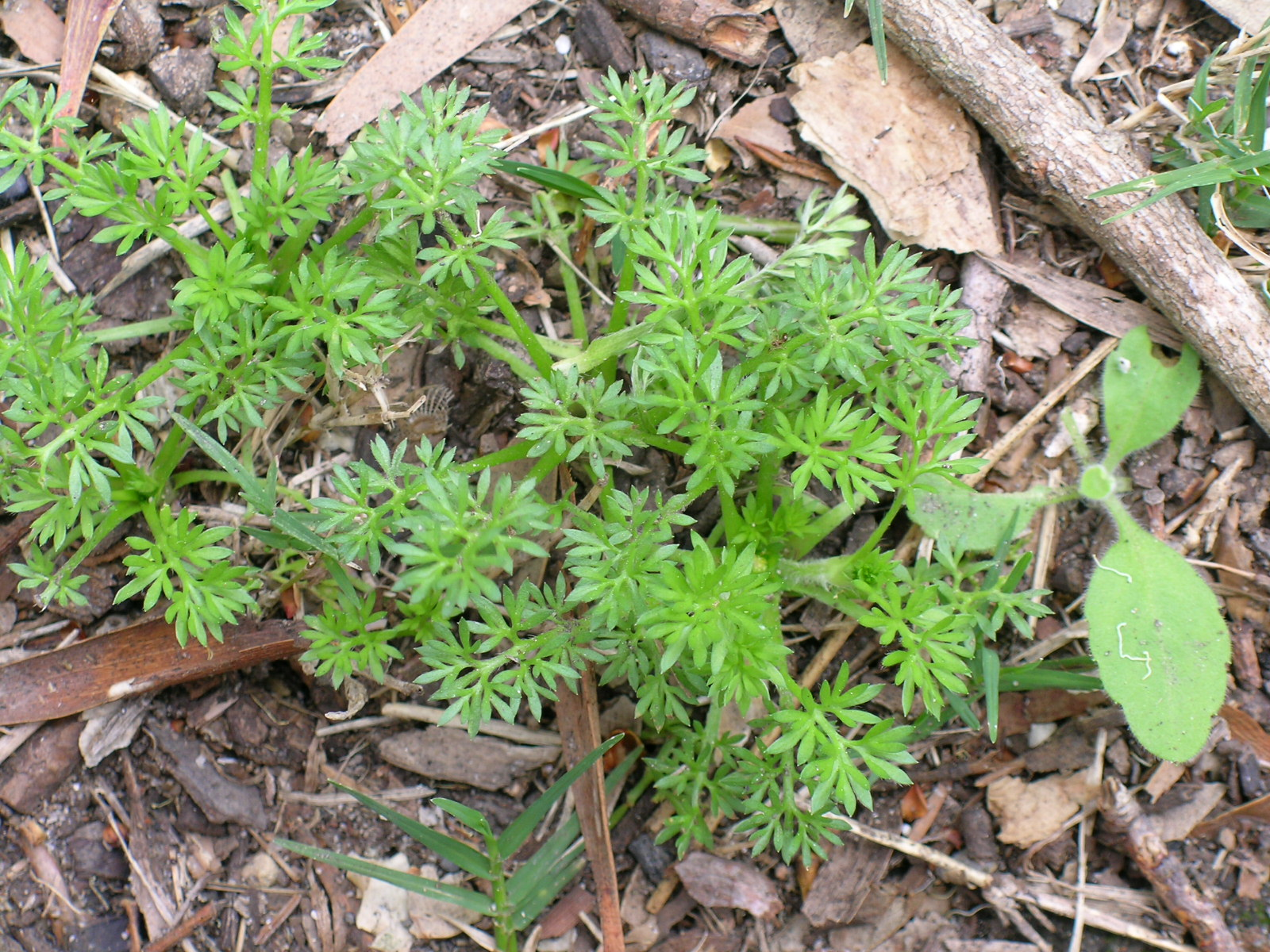
Soliva sessilis habit

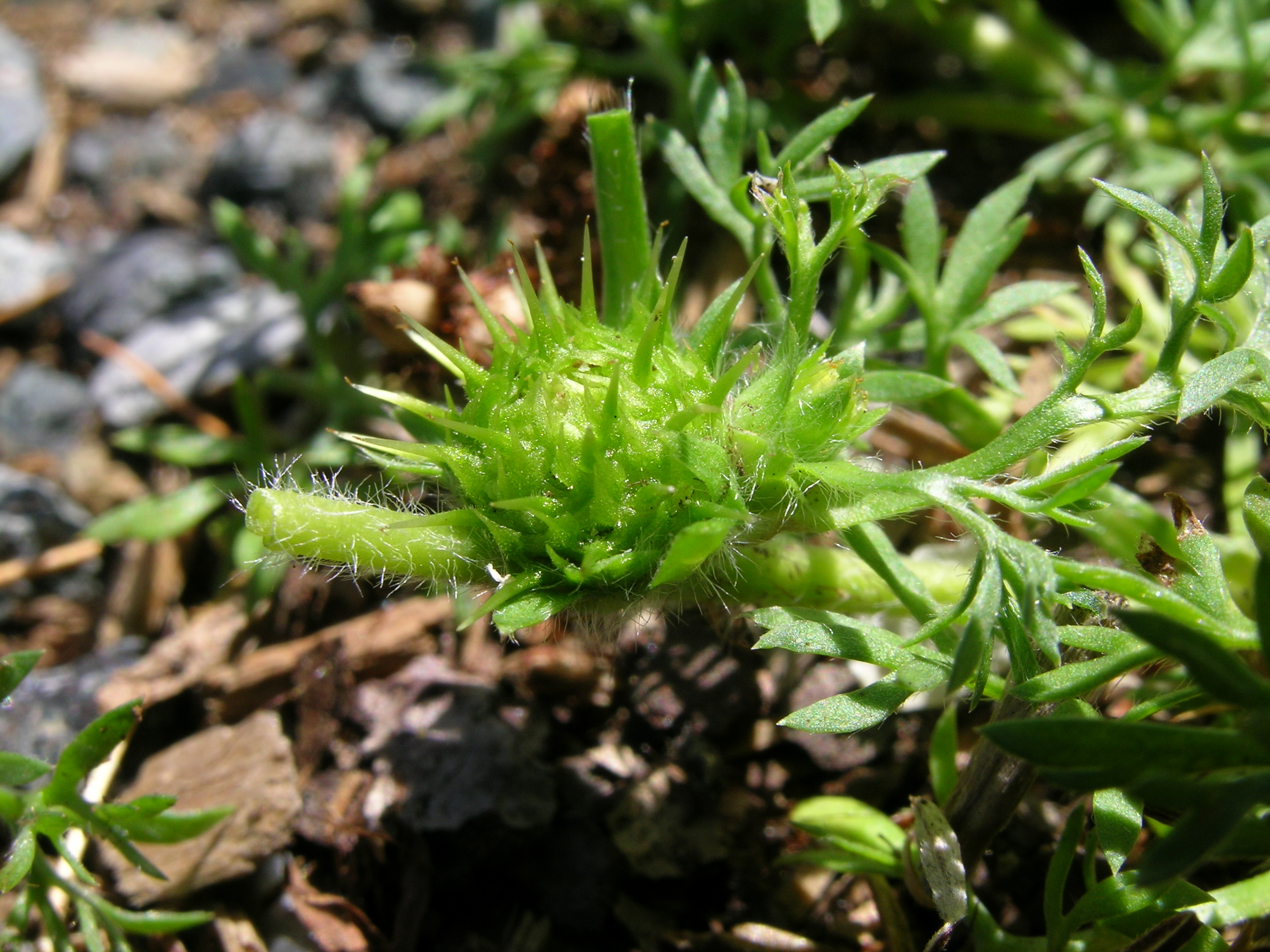
Soliva sessilis fruit

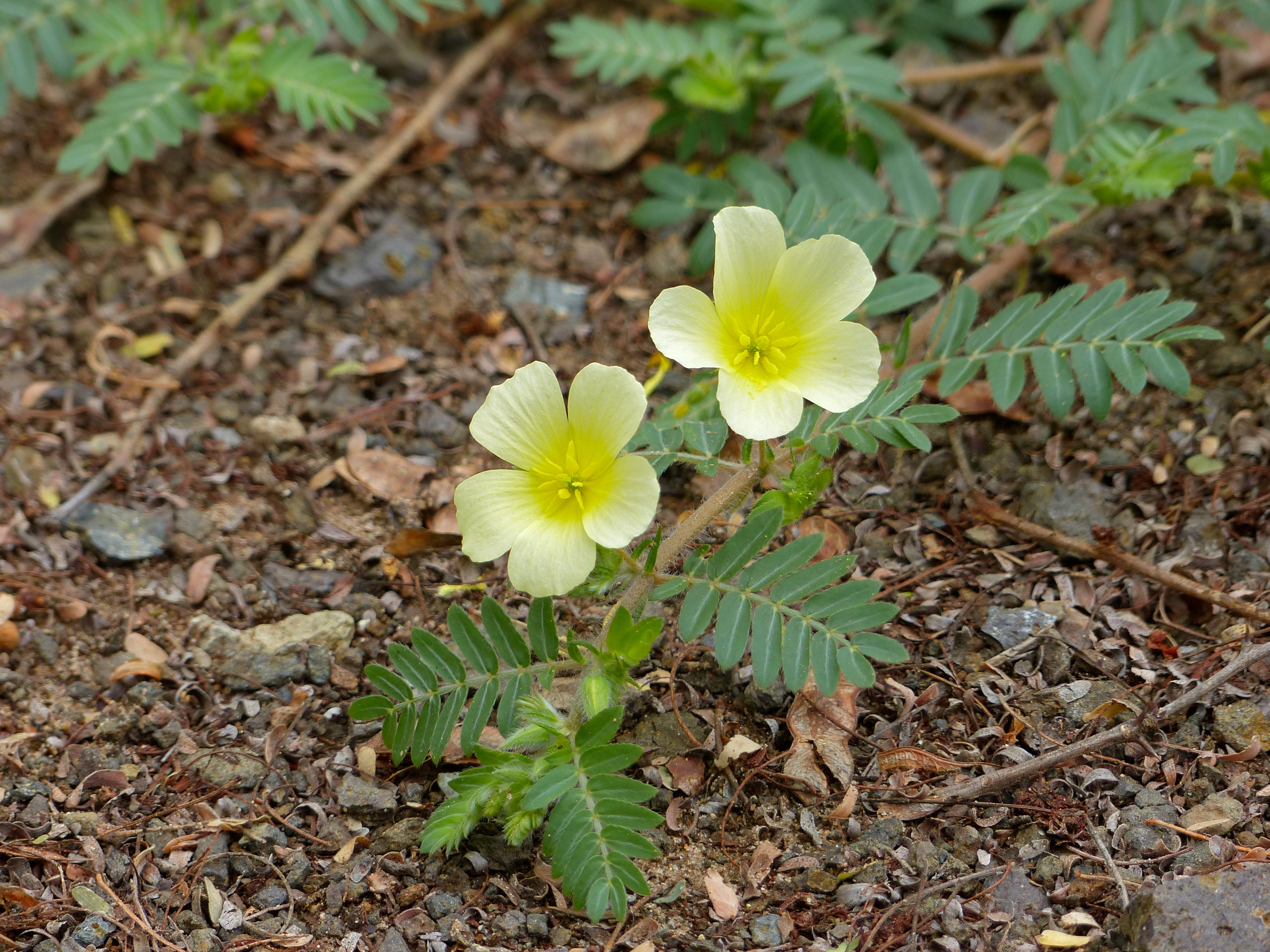
Tribulus terrestris flowers

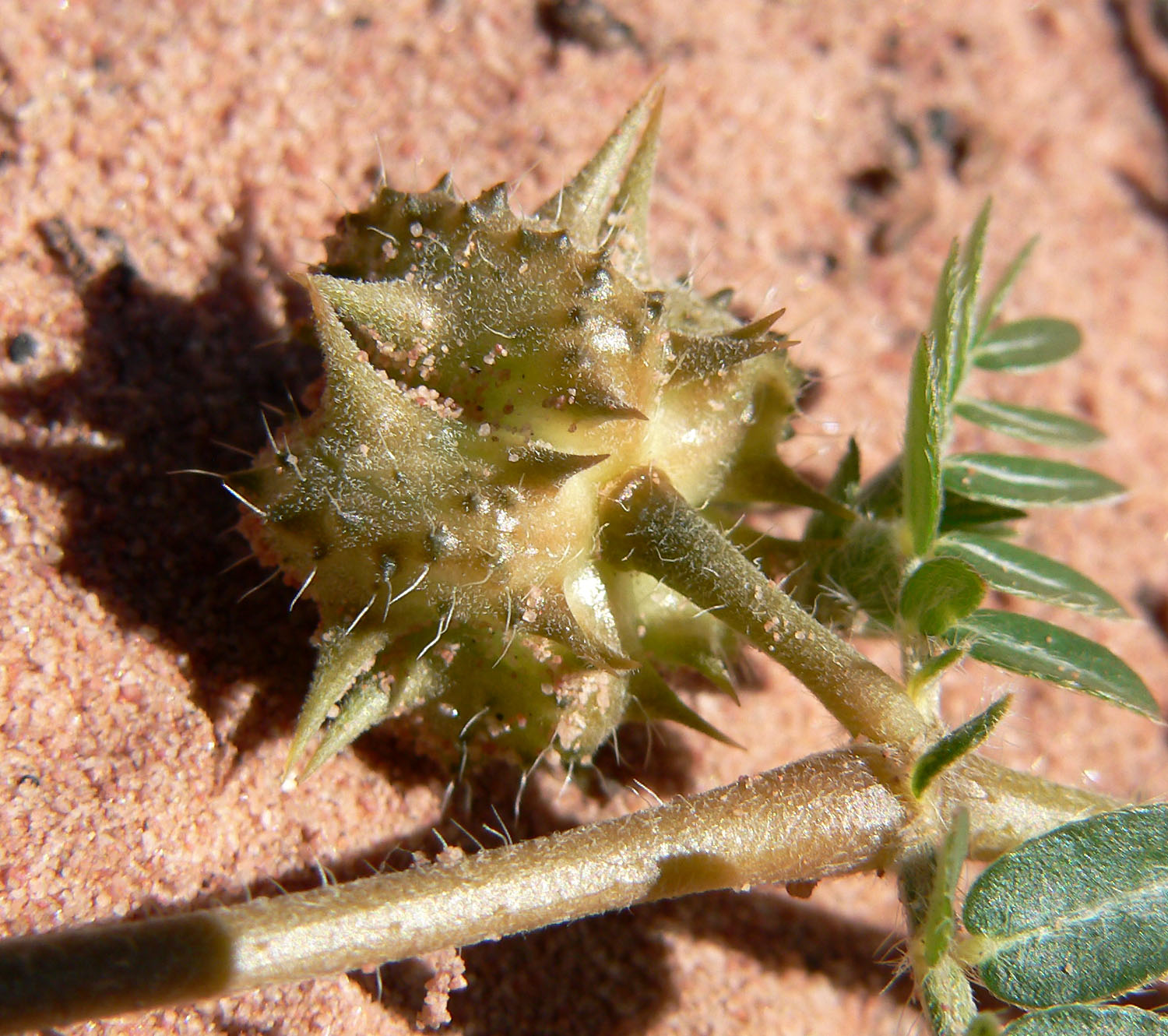
Tribulus terrestris fruit

== See also ==
- Bindi (disambiguation)
- Bindeez
