= Bindy =

Bindy is a commonly used abbreviation of the girl's name Belinda. It may refer to:

== People ==
- Belinda "Bindy" Bourquin, musician, former member of the Principal Edwards Magic Theatre English performance art collective
- Bindy Johal (Bhupinder Singh Johal, 1971–1998), Indo-Canadian organized crime leader
- Belinda Hocking (born 1990), Australian swimmer

== Fictional characters ==
- Belinda "Bindy" Craig, in the 1936 film Soak the Rich
- Bindy Mackenzie, the title character of Jaclyn Moriarty's novel The Betrayal of Bindy Mackenzie

== See also ==
- Bindi (name)
- "Bindy" (1998 song), song from the disc Cowboy Bebop No Disc, see Music of Cowboy Bebop
