= Bindi Hindowa Samba =

Sierra Leone politician

Bindi Hindowa Samba is a Sierra Leonean paramount chief of the Bo District, one of the four districts that make up the Southern Province.

== See also ==
- Politics of Sierra Leone
