= Urna =

Spiral or circular dot placed on the forehead of Buddhist images

Translations of Urna
- Sanskrit: ऊर्णा (IAST: ūrṇā)
- Pali: उण्ण (uṇṇa)
- Burmese: ဥဏ္ဏ (MLCTS: unna.)
- Chinese: 白毫 (Pinyin: báiháo)
- Japanese: 白毫 (Rōmaji: byakugō)
- Khmer: ឧណ្ណា (UNGEGN: ʼŏnna)
- Korean: 백호 (RR: baekho)
- Lao: ອຸນາ (ʼunā)
- Tibetan: མཛོད་སྦུས་ (Wylie: mdzod spu)
- Thai: อุณา (RTGS: ùnaa)
- Vietnamese: bạch mao tướng

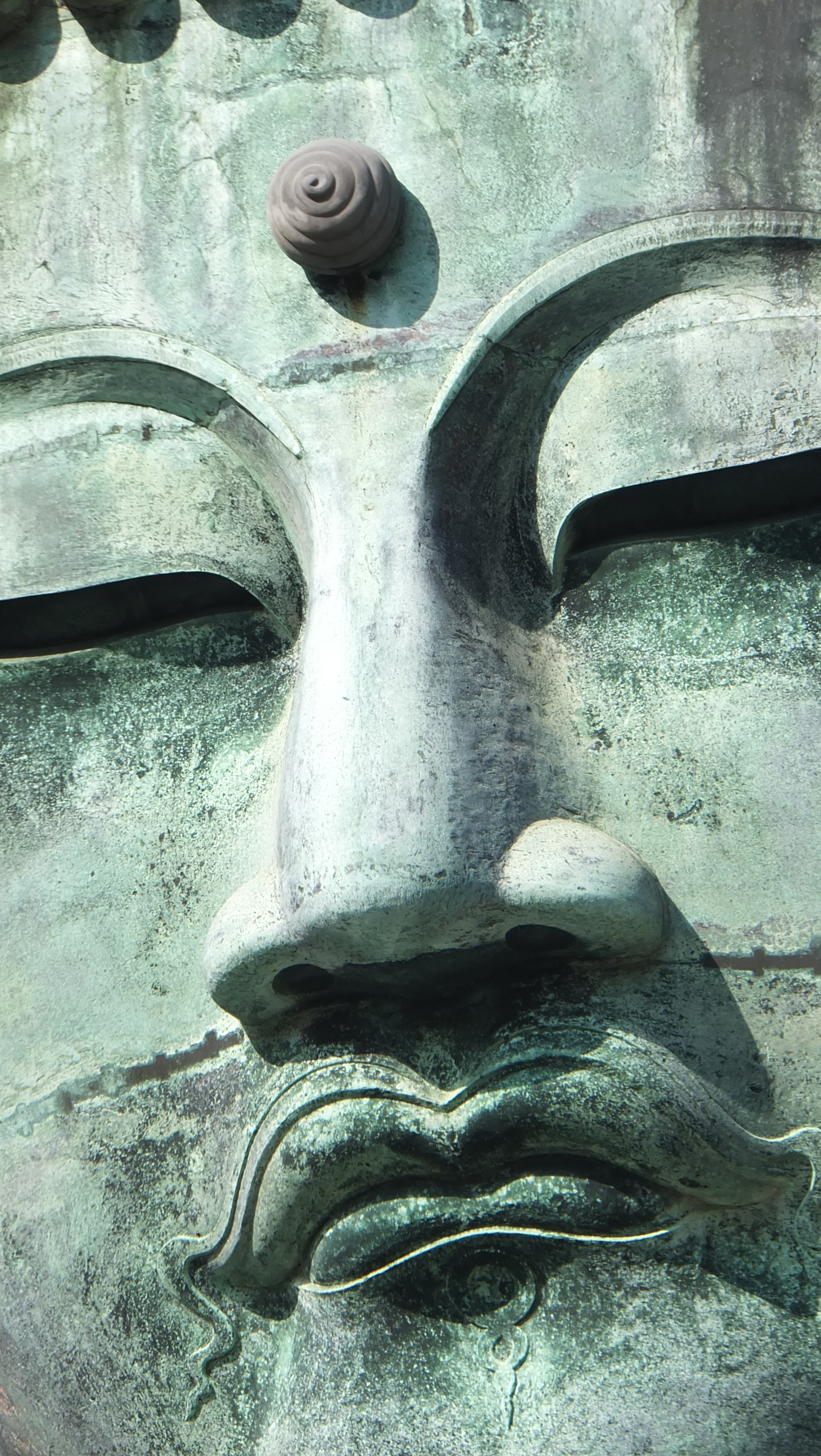
The urna on the Amitābha Great Buddha of Kamakura

In Buddhist art and culture, the urna (Sanskrit: ūrṇā, ūrṇākeśa or ūrṇākośa, lit. 'hair treasure') is a spiral or circular mark placed on the forehead of Buddhist images as an auspicious sign.

As set out in the Lakkhana Sutta (Discourse on Marks), the ūrṇā is the thirty-first physical characteristic of the Buddha.

The ūrṇā is generally interpreted as a whorl of white hair which marks a Buddha as a great being (mahāpuruṣa). In the Mahayana sutras, the Buddha is often depicted as shining light out of his ūrṇā to illuminate distant world systems. This light became an object of meditation in Mahayana Buddhism.

The ūrṇā is often seen on Buddhist sculptures from the 2nd century CE onwards. The ūrṇā remains part of standard Buddhist iconography today, often depicted as a gem placed slightly above and between the eyebrows of a Buddha or a bodhisattva.

== Gallery ==
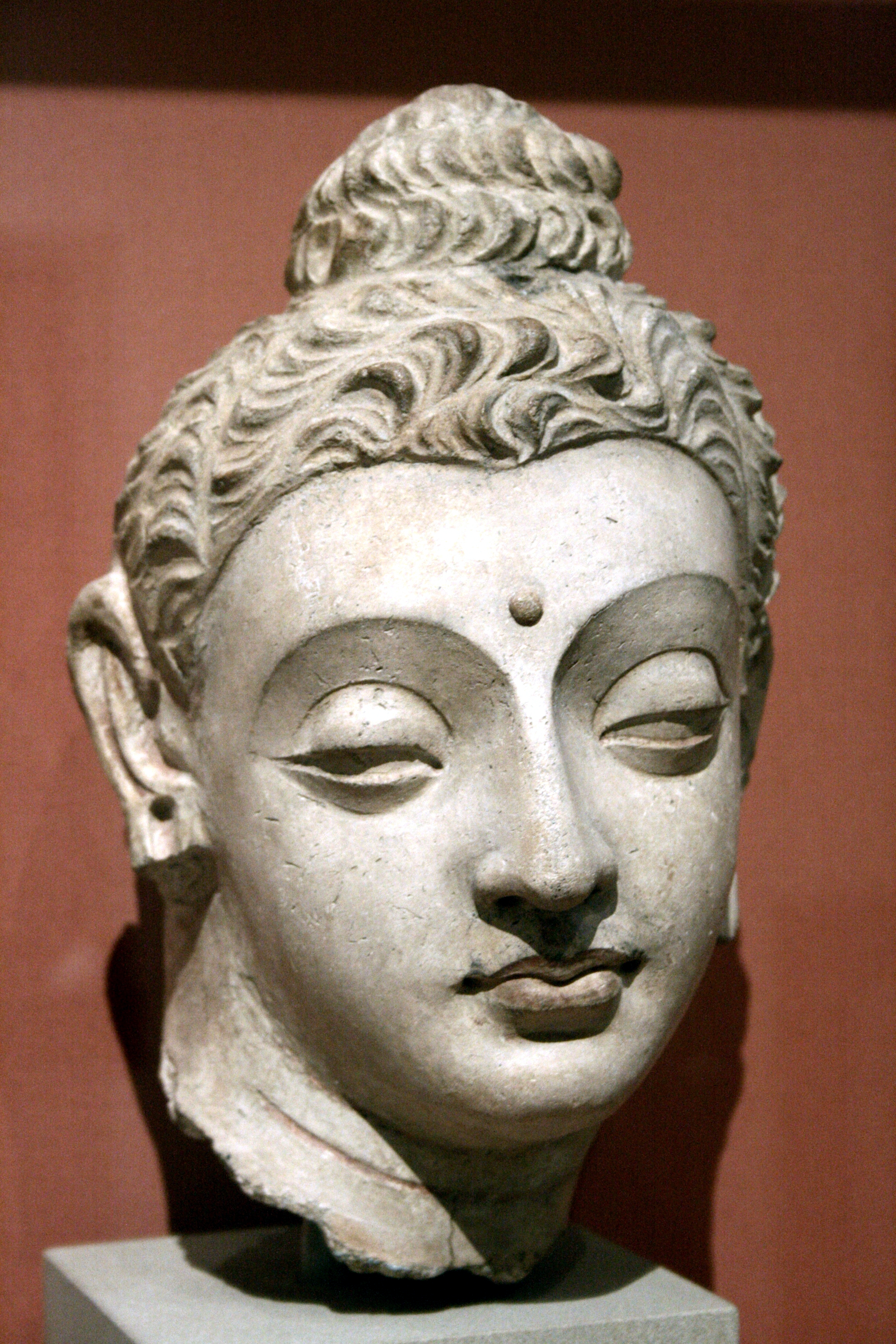
Buddha with ūrṇā depicted as a circular dot

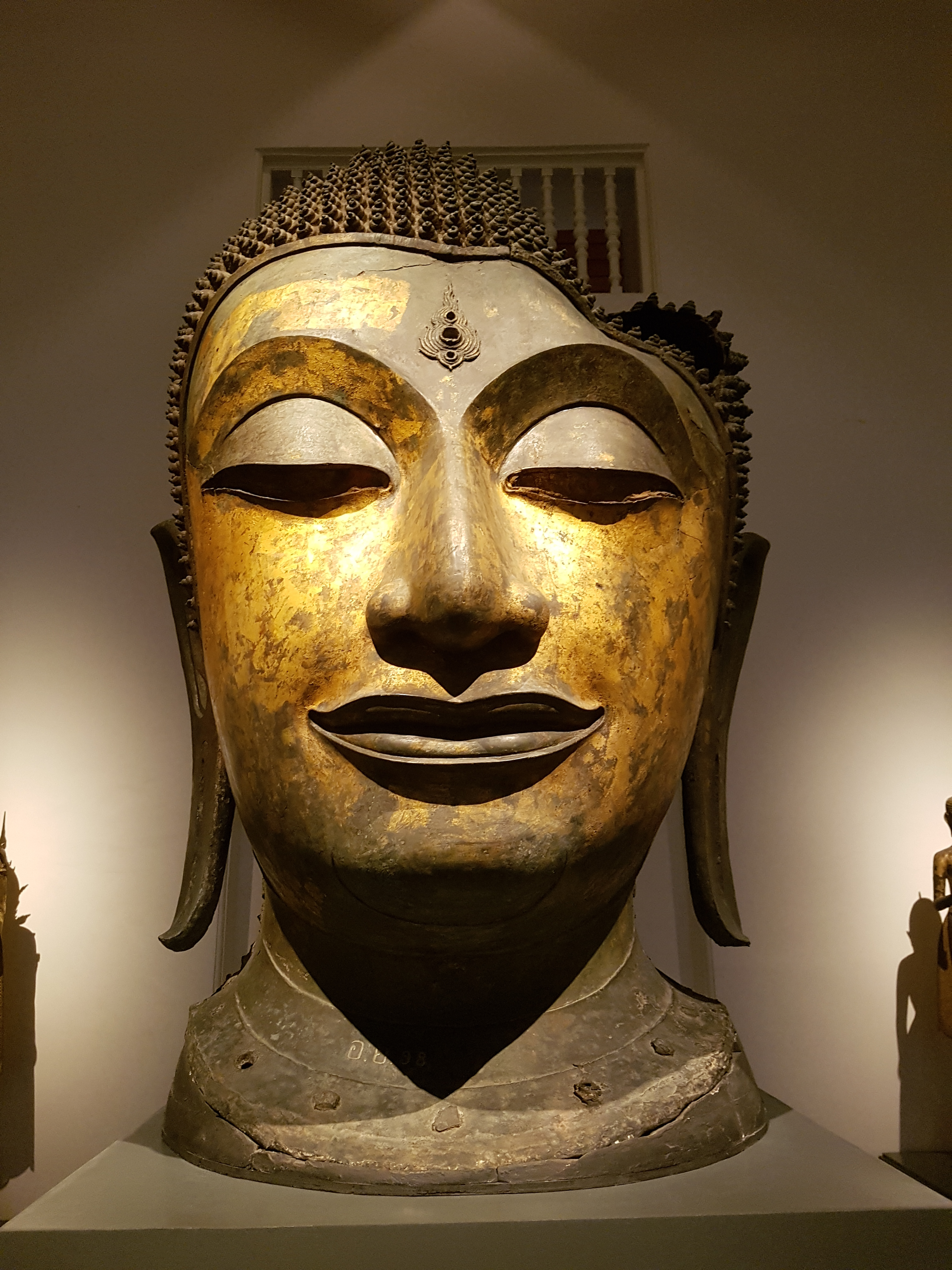
Buddha sculpture found within the vihāra of Wat Phra Si Sanphet, Phra Nakhon Si Ayutthaya Province, Thailand, 16th century CE

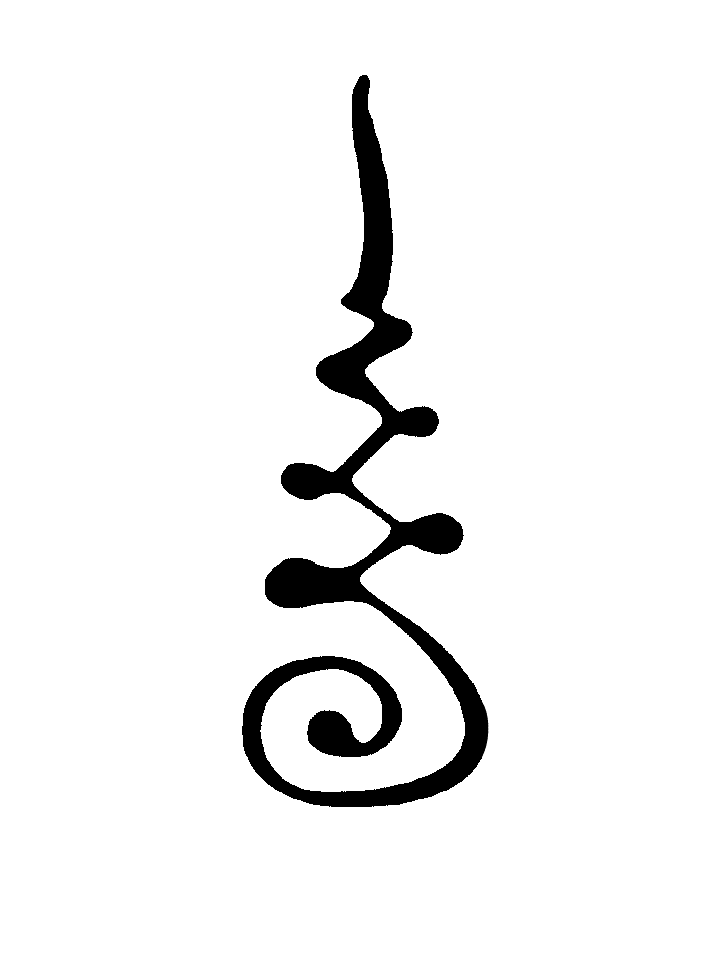
The unalome (อุณาโลม) yantra is a stylised representation of the urna

== See also ==
- Ājñā
- Bindi (decoration)
- Bindu (symbol)
- Yantra tattooing
- Paklei Namsa
- Third eye
