= Bindi =

Dot worn on the centre of the forehead

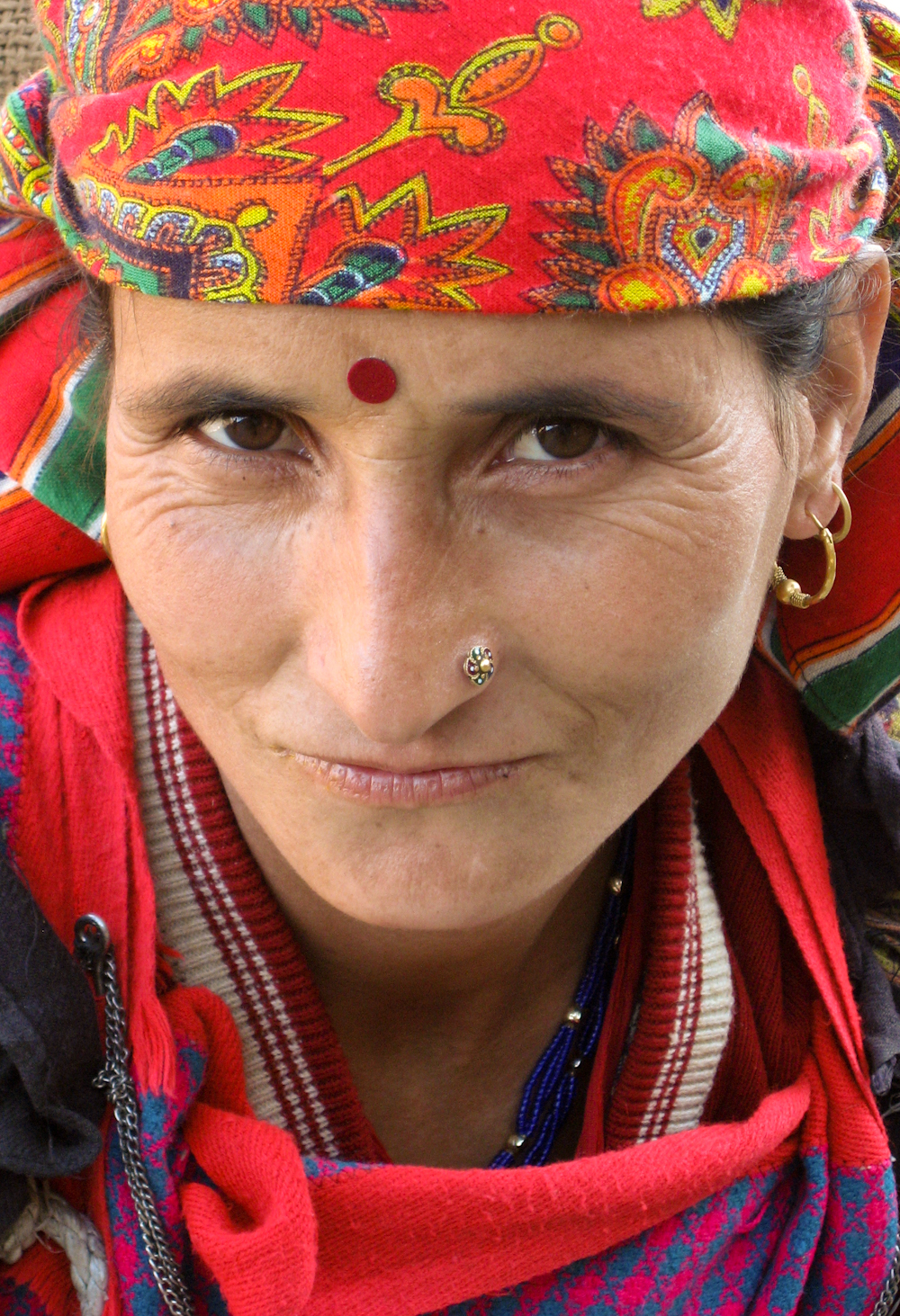
Hindu woman in Kullu, Himachal Pradesh wearing a stick-on bindi

A bindi (from Sanskrit bindú meaning "point, drop, dot or small particle") is a coloured dot or, in modern times, a sticker worn on the centre of the forehead, by Hindus, Jains, and Buddhists from the Indian subcontinent. While there are regional variations, traditional bindis are red or maroon, made with material such as kumkum.

A bindi is a bright dot of some colour applied in the centre of the forehead close to the eyebrows or in the middle of the forehead that is worn in the Indian subcontinent (particularly amongst female Hindus in India, Pakistan, Nepal, Bhutan, Bangladesh and Sri Lanka) and Southeast Asia among Balinese, Javanese, Sundanese, Malaysian, Singaporean, Visayan, Vietnamese, and Myanmar Hindus. A similar marking is also worn by babies and children in China and, as in the Indian subcontinent and Southeast Asia, represents the opening of the third eye. In Hinduism, Buddhism, and Jainism the bindi is associated with the ajna chakra, and Bindu is known as the third eye chakra. Bindu is the point or dot around which the mandala is created, representing the universe. The bindi has a religious, historical and cultural presence in the region of India and with the Hindu, Indian diaspora around the world.

== Religious significance ==
Ajna chakra has two lotus petals dedicated to the sun, the other to the moon (e.g. light and dark, or male and female) merged at the centre.

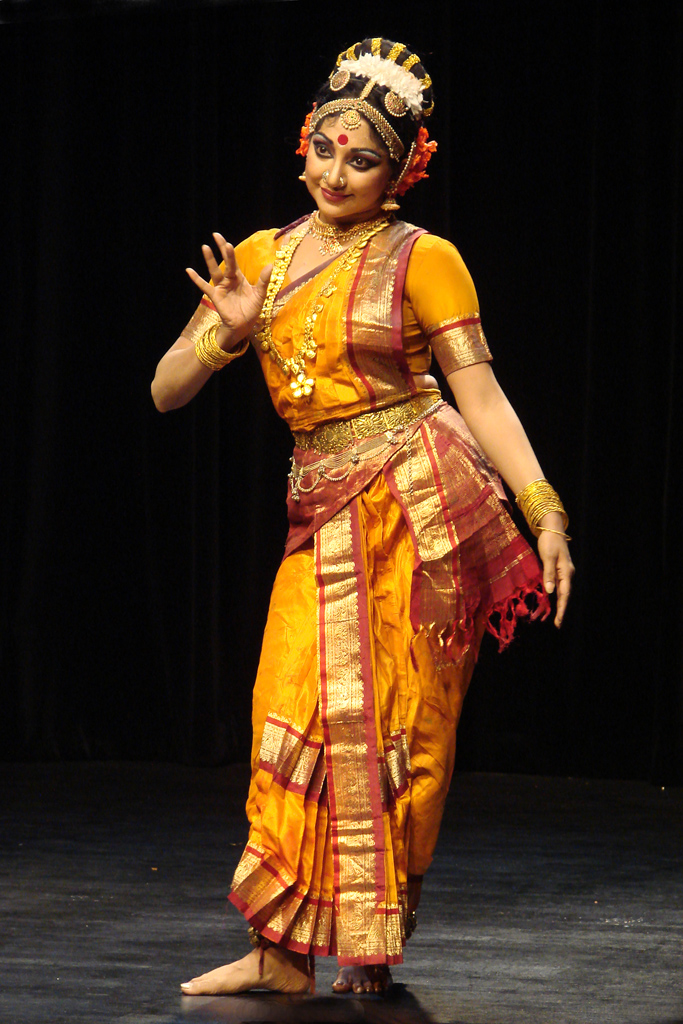
Bindi and traditional head ornament with sun and moon pendants on an Indian classical dancer

Traditionally, the area between the eyebrows (where the bindi is placed) is said to be the sixth chakra, ajna, the seat of "concealed wisdom." The bindi is said to retain energy and strengthen concentration. The bindi also represents the third eye. The Nasadiya Sukta of the Rig Veda, the earliest known Sanskrit text, mentions the word Bindu.

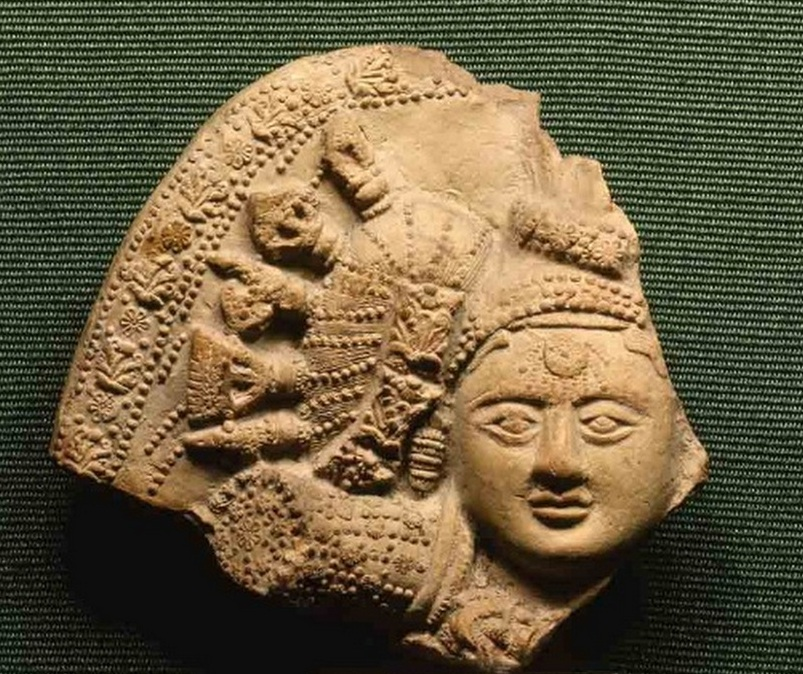
Female figure with bindi ornament, terracotta, 200–250 BCE

The Ajna is symbolised by a sacred lotus with two petals, and corresponds to the colours violet, indigo or deep blue, though it is traditionally described as white. It is at this point that the two sides Nadi Ida (yoga) and Pingala are said to terminate and merge with the central channel Sushumna, signifying the end of duality, the characteristic of being dual (e.g. light and dark, or male and female). The seed syllable for this chakra is the syllable OM, and the presiding deity is Ardhanarishvara, who is a half male, half female Shiva/Shakti. The Shakti goddess of Ajna is called Hakini. In metaphysics, Bindu is considered the dot or point at which creation begins and may become unity. It is also described as "the sacred symbol of the cosmos in its unmanifested state". Bindu is the point around which the mandala is created, representing the universe. Ajna's key issues involve balancing the higher and lower selves and trusting inner guidance. Ajna's inner aspect relates to the access of intuition. Mentally, Ajna deals with visual consciousness. Emotionally, Ajna deals with clarity on an intuitive level.

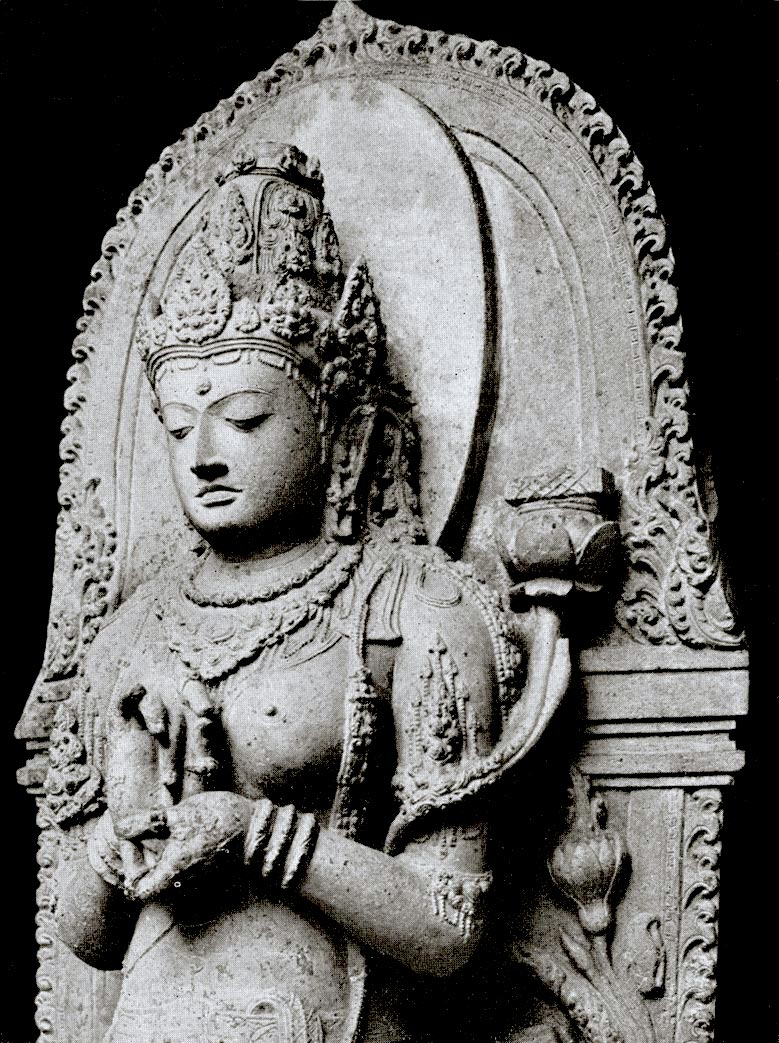
Goddess Tara depicted with Ajna Bhrumadhya Bindu known as inner gaze. Bhrumadhya is the point in the centre of the forehead commonly referred to as the third eye, or centre of consciousness.

In Hinduism, Buddhism, and Jainism, bindi is associated with Ajna Chakra and Bindu. Divinities in these religions are typically depicted with Bhrumadhya Bindu, in meditative pose with their eyes nearly closed show the gaze focused between eyebrows, other spot being the tip of the nose—Naasikagra. The very spot between the eyebrows known as Bhrumadhya is where one focuses one's sight, so that it helps concentration.

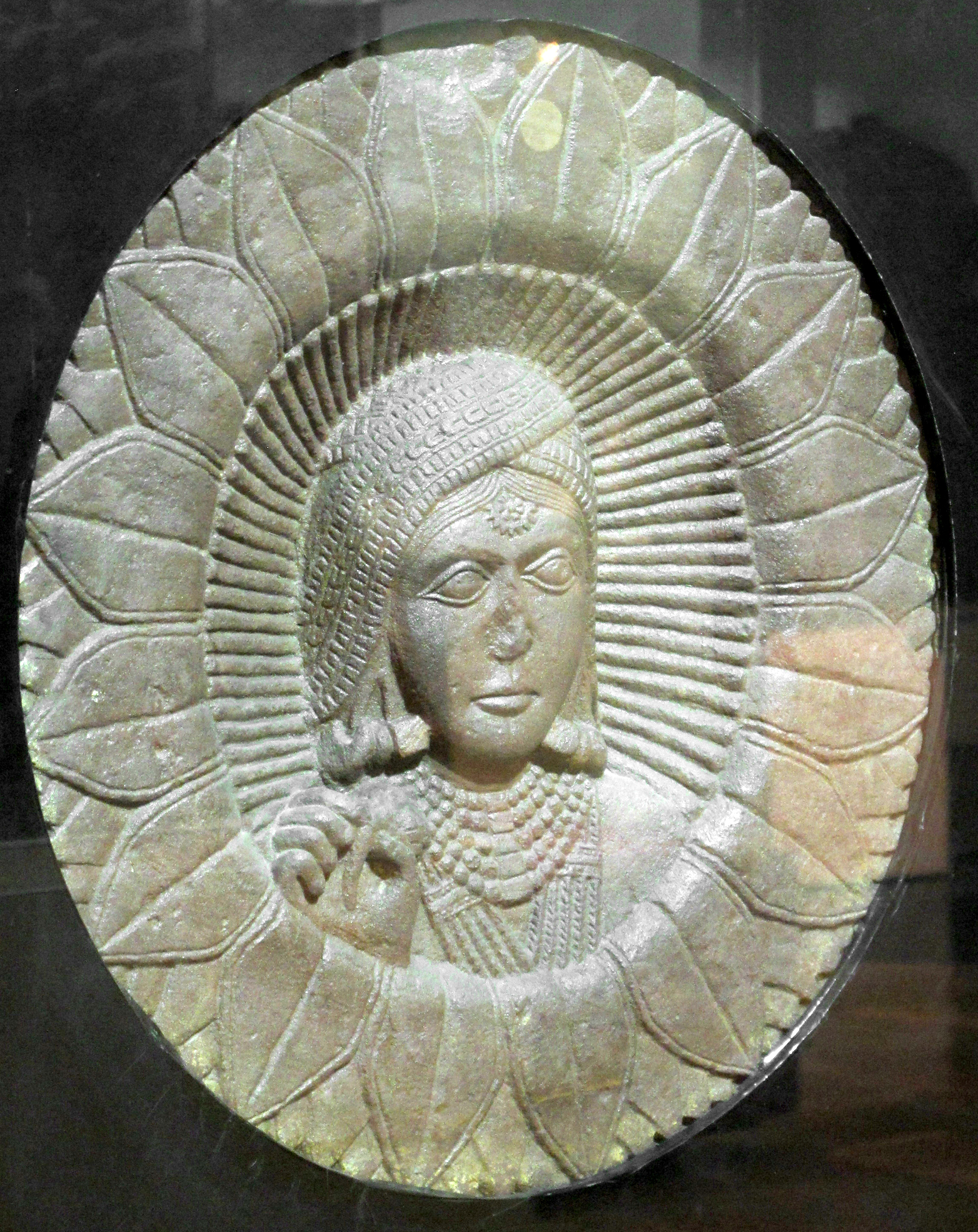
Relief from stupa, 2nd century B.C. Only female figures were marked with the sacred lotus during this period

The bindi has multiple meanings:

- Archaeology has yielded clay female figurines from the Indus Valley with red pigment on the forehead and hair parting. It is unclear whether this held any religious or cultural significance.
- In Hinduism, the colour red represents honour, love, and prosperity, hence bindis are worn to symbolise these qualities after marriage in particular.
- In meditation, the point between the eyebrows (Bhrumadhya) is where one focuses one's sight, to help concentration. Most images of Hindu, Jain or Buddhist divinities in meditative poses with their eyes nearly closed show the gaze focused between the eyebrows (another spot being the tip of the nose—naasikagra)
- Swami Muktananda writes that "auspicious Kumkuma or sandalwood paste is applied (between the eyebrows) out of respect for the inner Guru. It is the Guru's seat. There is a chakra (centre of spiritual energy within the human body) here called Ajna chakra, meaning 'Command centre'. Here is received the Guru's command to go higher in Sadhana (spiritual practice) to the 'Sahasraar' (seventh and final chakra) which leads to Self-realisation. The flame seen at the eyebrow is called 'Guru Jyoti'."
- The encyclopaedic Dictionary of Yoga reports that this 'Ajna Chakra' is also called the 'Third eye'. This centre is connected with the sacred syllable 'Om' and presiding, is 'Parashiva'. On activating this centre, the aspirant overcomes 'Ahankāra' (the ego or sense of individuality), the last stop on the path of spirituality.

The bindi continues to hold symbolic significance rooted in Indian mythology and is traditionally associated with Hindu culture. "wearing a bindi or mangalsutra is a sign of Hindu women. The traditional bindi still represents and preserves the symbolic significance that is integrated into Indian mythology in many parts of India."

== Traditional application method ==
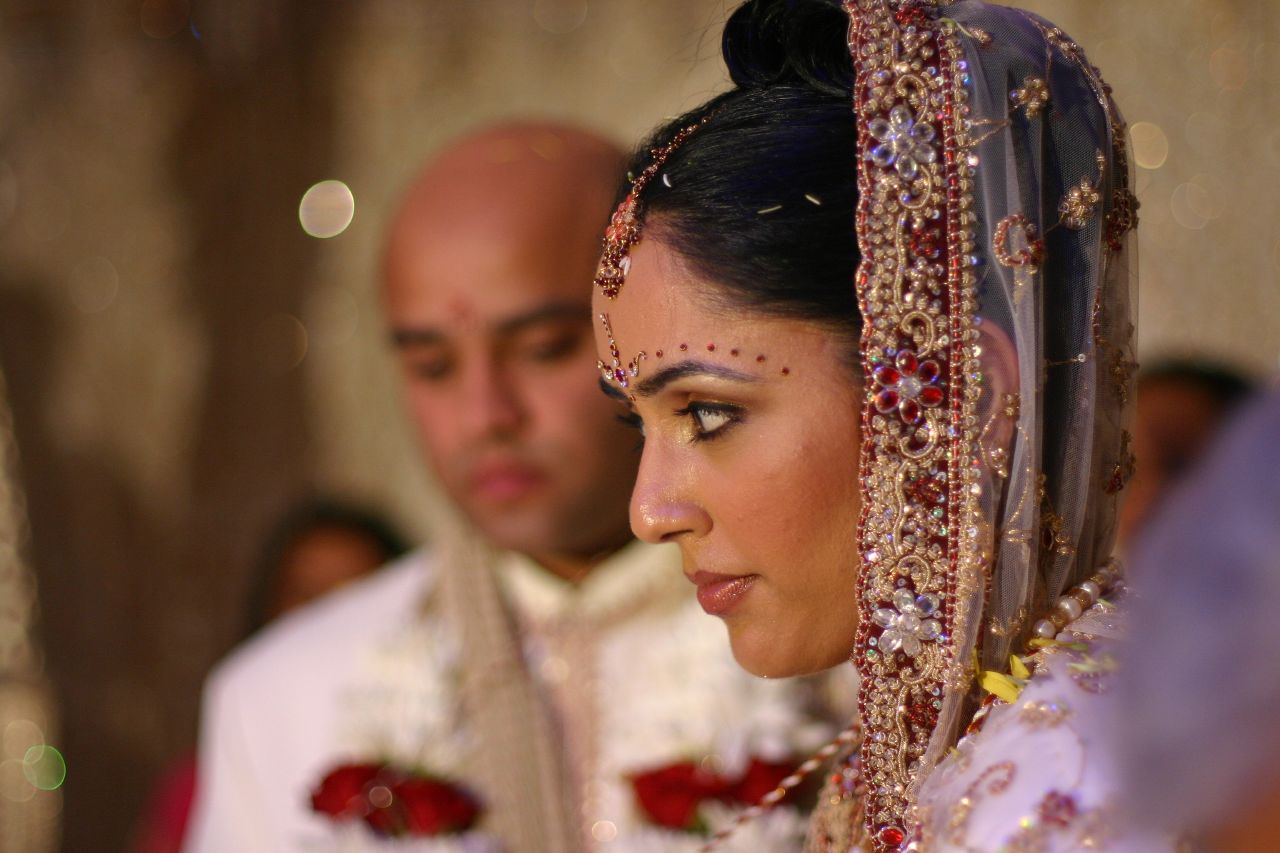
Bride with decorative bindis and maang tika between hair parting where married women apply sindoor

A traditional bindi is red or maroon in colour as it mimics sindoor or kumkum which is used as part Hindu religious ceremonies and rituals along with sandalwood, turmeric and ash. A pinch of vermilion powder is applied with a ring-finger to make a dot. A small annular disc aids application for beginners. First, a sticky wax paste is applied through the empty centre of the disc. This is then covered with kumkum or vermilion and then the disc is removed to get a round bindi. Various materials such as lac, sandal, "aguru", mica, "kasturi", kumkum (made of red turmeric) and sindoor colour the dot. Saffron ground together with "kusumba" flower can also work. Traditionally they are green in colour with a red dot in the middle. The bindi is no longer restricted in colour or shape.

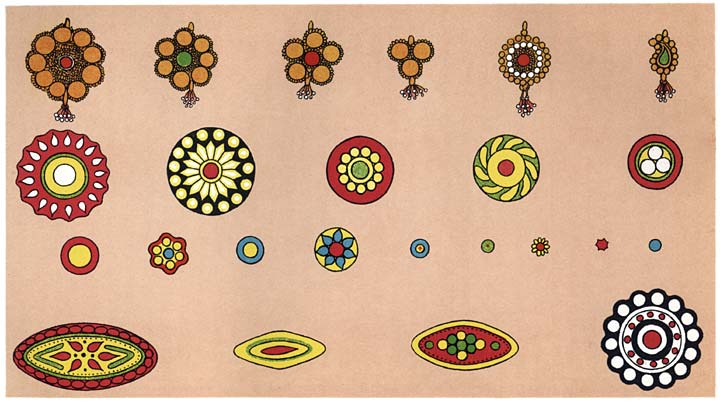
Ornamental bindis were made and sold by lac workers known as Lakhera.

Historically, the ornamental bindi spangle consists of a small piece of lac over which is smeared vermilion, while above it a piece of mica or thin glass is fixed for ornament. Women wore large spangles set in gold with a border of jewels if they could afford it. The bindi was made and sold by lac workers known as Lakhera. In Hinduism, it's part of the Suhāg or lucky trousseau at marriages and is affixed to the girl's forehead on her wedding and thereafter always worn. Unmarried girls optionally wore small ornamental spangles on their foreheads. A widow was not allowed to wear bindi or any ornamentation associated with married women. In modern times, self-adhesive bindis are available in various materials, usually made of felt or thin metal and adhesive on the other side. These are simple to apply, disposable substitutes for older lac tikli bindis. Sticker bindis come in many colours, designs, materials, and sizes.

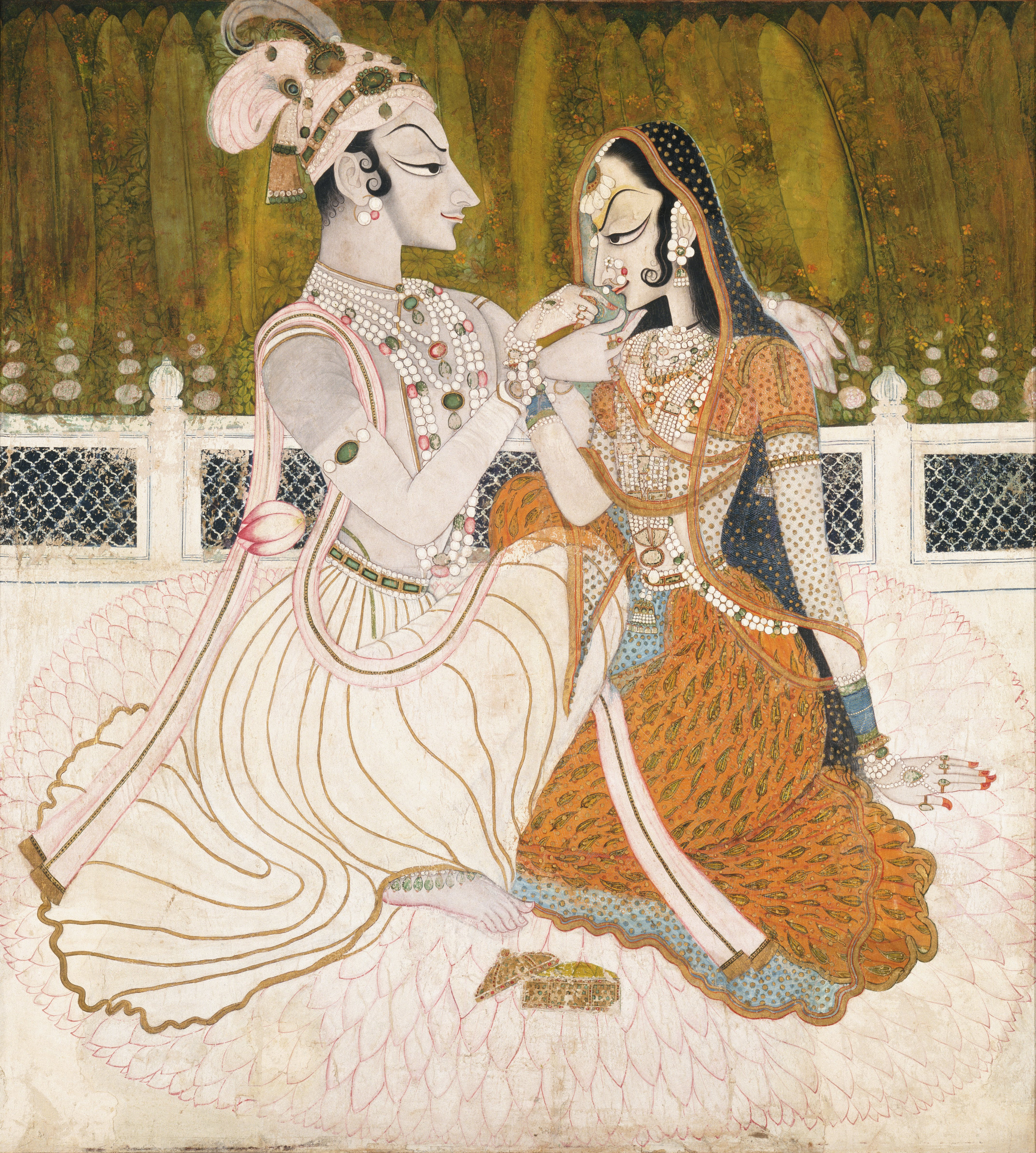
Courtesan Bani Thani as Radha with ornamental bindi spangle, c. 1750

There are different regional variations of the bindi. In Maharashtra a large crescent moon shaped bindi is worn with a smaller black dot underneath or above, associated with Chandrabindu and Bindu chakra represented by crescent moon, they are commonly known as Chandrakor in this region, outside Maharashtra they are popularly known as Marathi bindi. In Bengal region a large round red bindi is worn, brides in this region are often decorated with Alpana design on forehead and cheeks, along with bindi. In southern India a smaller red bindi is worn with a white tilak at the bottom, another common type is a red tilak shaped bindi. In Rajasthan the bindi is often worn round. Long tilak shaped bindi are also common, as well as the crescent moon on some occasions. Decorative bindis have become popular among women in South Asia, regardless of religious background. Bindis are a staple and symbolic for women in the Indian subcontinent.

In addition to the bindi, in India, a vermilion mark in the parting of the hair just above the forehead is worn by married women as a symbol of life-long commitment to their husbands. During all Hindu marriage ceremonies, the groom applies sindoor in the part in the bride's hair.

Apart from their cosmetic use, bindis have found a modern medical application in India. Iodine patch bindis have often been used among women in north-west Maharashtra to battle iodine deficiency.

== Related customs in other Asian regions ==
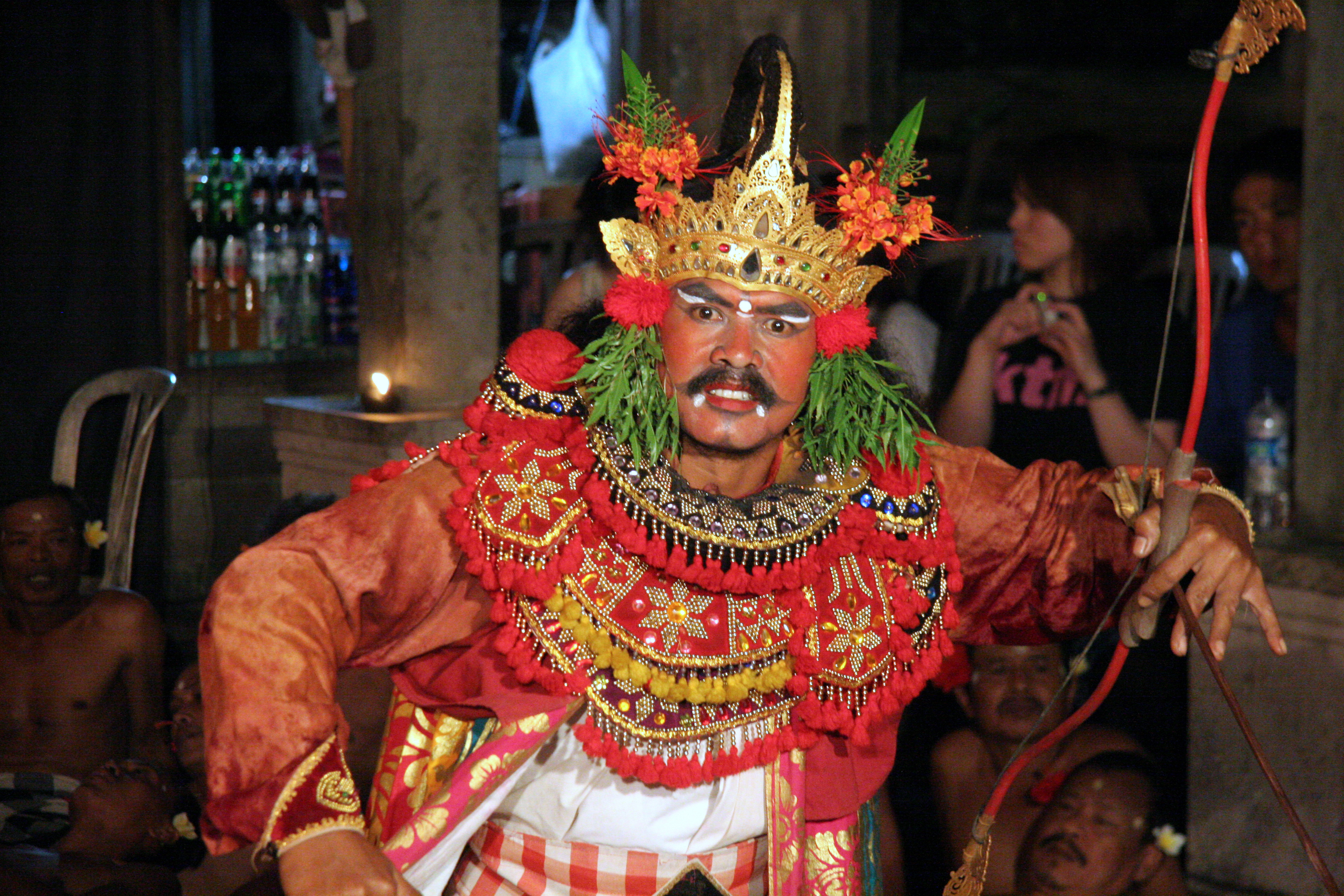
A Balinese dancer with a white bindi

In Southeast Asia, bindis are worn by the Balinese, Javanese, and Sundanese people of Indonesia. For example, bindis are often worn by brides and grooms in Java and other parts of Indonesia, regardless of their religious beliefs.

The Indonesian practice of wearing a bindi originated from the cultural influence brought about by the Indianized Hindu kingdoms that once ruled Indonesia. Historically, other Indianized kingdoms in Southeast Asia also took part in this practice.

=== Teep ===
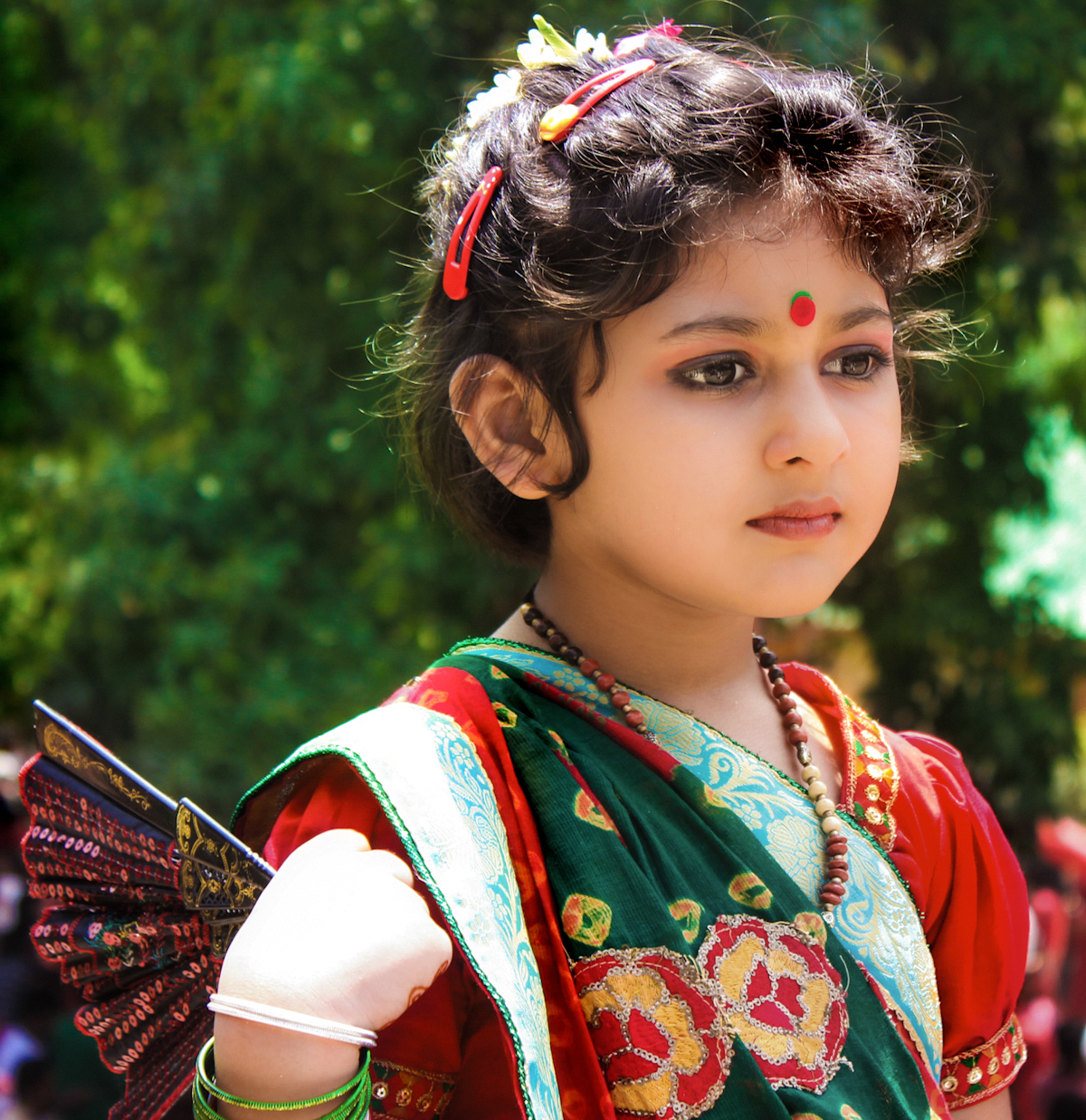
Bengali girl from Bangladesh wearing Teep on the occasion of Pohela Boishakh

Teep or tip, similar to bindis, are part of Bengali culture and women in West Bengal, India and Bangladesh, irrespective of their religion, adorn themselves with teeps as an ethnic practice. By the 18th century the use of teeps had become very common.

Depending on the occasion the colours of teep change, such as red and white for Pohela Boishakh, green, orange and yellow for Pohela Falgun, blue and white for Barsha Mangal, brown and mustard colour for Nabanna, purple and pink for Eid Al Fitr and black for International mother Language Day, Eid Al Adha, red and green for Independence Day and Victory Day. Bengali Muslim brides wearing "kalka tip" on their forehead is an old tradition of Bangladesh.

=== Bindis in Pakistan ===
In Sindh, some Muslim Sindhi women apply a black dot or line by "Kajjal or Surmo (kohl)" on the forehead and chin, and sometimes three dots or lines around eyes as part of historic and ancestral Hindu traditions that have sustained post-Partition. As an amulet believed to protect against the evil-eye, these dots are called Tikro or the Hindi 'Tilak' (singular), or Tikra (plural).

Like in India, in Sindh, when a child is born, black dots/marks and lines are drawn on their faces. In modern times, stick-on bindiyas of different shapes and designs have become very common in rural Sindh, and are applied by both Muslims and Hindus. However, this is in decline as it is considered to be appropriately used by Sindhi Hindus only.

In the pre-modern era in Sindh, Hindu brides and even some Muslim brides were applied with many dots of "Tira" (moles) drawn upon their face and lips with needles dipped in antimony and other colouring matters.

The type of forehead tattoo called Khaal or Sheen Khal was also common among Afghan and Pashtun women, although it is no longer done for religious reasons. As in Sindh, dots are made using kohl or other material. Bindis are also used by Saraiki and some Baloch tribal women of Pakistan. However, many Muhajirs and Punjabis consider the use of bindis to be un-Islamic. Due to this, the use of bindis has declined in most of Pakistan except for the Hindu majority villages and areas of Sindh such as in Nagarparkar.

== Modern use ==
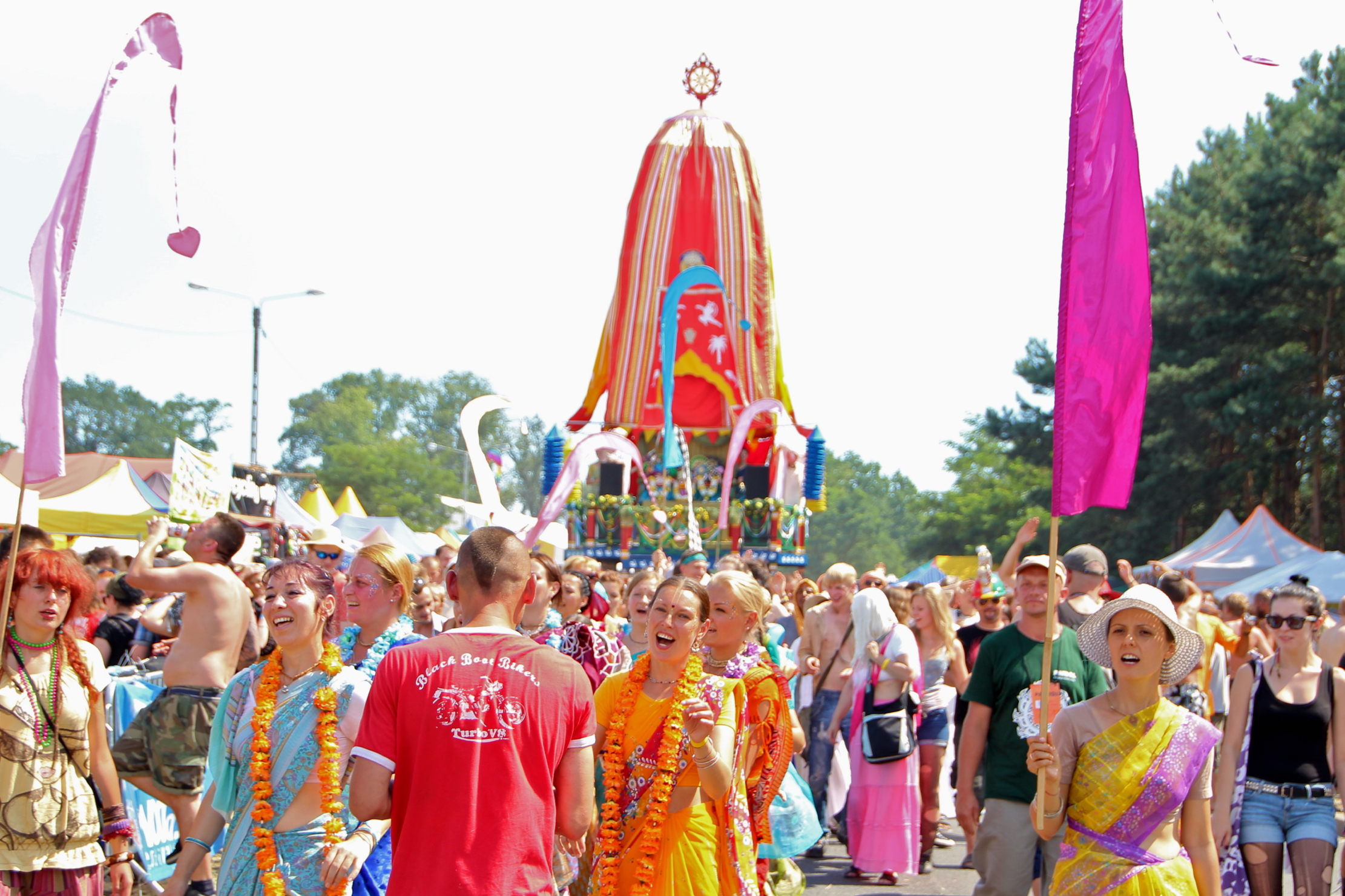
Bindis and other religious affiliated markings are worn by recent Hindu converts like Hare Krishnas.

Bindis are sometimes worn purely for decorative purpose or style statement without any religious or cultural affiliation. Decorative and ornamental bindis were introduced to other parts of the world by immigrants from the Indian subcontinent. International celebrities such as Gwen Stefani, Julia Roberts, Madonna, Selena Gomez and many others have been seen wearing bindis. The appropriateness of such uses has been disputed. Reacting to Gomez wearing a bindi while singing her song "Come and Get It", Hindu leader Rajan Zed said that the bindi has religious significance and should not be used as a fashion accessory, but Indian actress Priyanka Chopra praised Gomez's choice as "an embrace of Indian culture". Additionally, several rappers have adopted jewelled bindis, most notably Lil Uzi Vert, who debuted a $24 million pink diamond bindi in February 2021. They were inspired by Lil B who wore a diamond bindi in 2012.

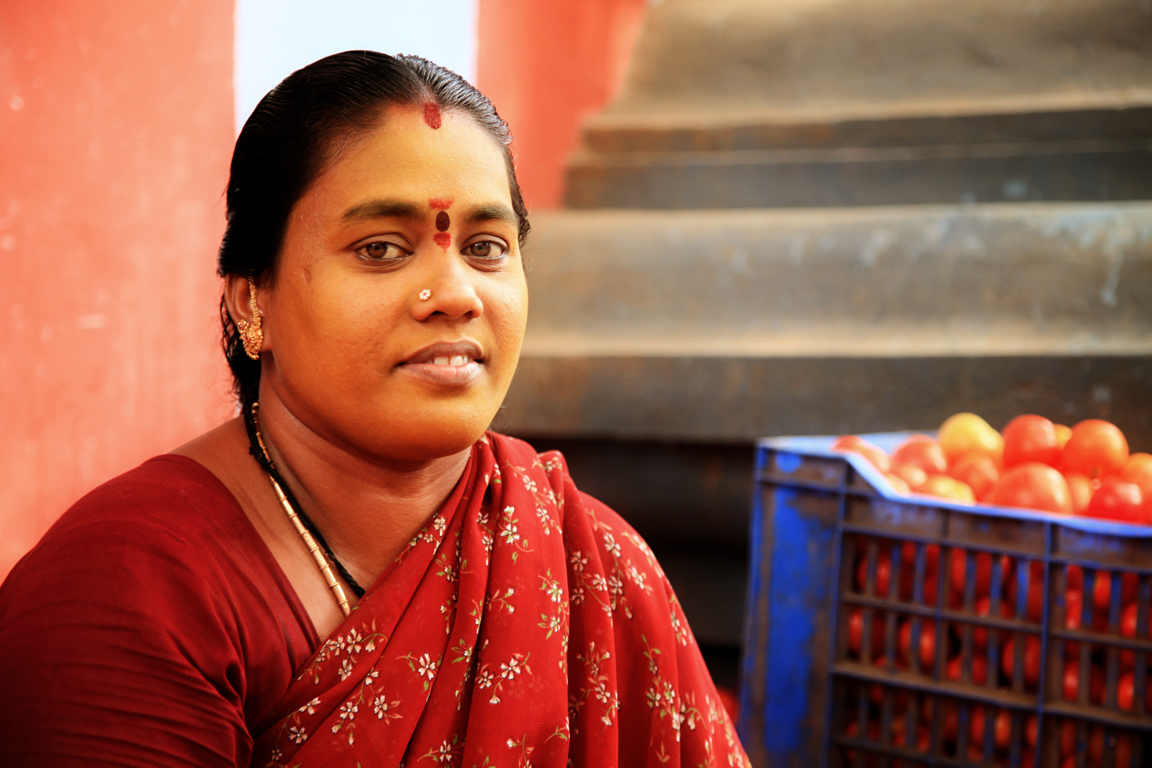
Tamil woman wearing bindi

== Alternative terms ==
A bindi can also be called:

- Phot or Phut (literally meaning a small pressing mark) in Assamese
- Tip (literally meaning "a pressing") in Bengali
- Tikuli (literally meaning "a small tika") in Madhyadeshi areas
- Chandlo (literally meaning moon shape) in Gujarati
- Tilaka in Hindi
- Tika in Nepali
- Kunkuma or Bottu or Tilaka in Kannada
- Tilakaya in Sinhala
- Tikli in Konkani
- Kunkoo or Tikali in Marathi
- Tikili in Odia
- Bindi in Punjabi meaning long red mark
- Pottu in Tamil and Malayalam
- Bottu, Kunkuma, or Tilakam in Telugu
- Tikli in Maithili
- Tyok in Kashmiri
- Tilkodi in Sindhi

== See also ==
- Huadian, a traditional Chinese forehead decoration
- Paklei Namsa
- Thirunamam
- Tilaka
- Urna
- Vibhuti, sacred ash applied across the forehead
