= 1997–98 Women's National Cricket League season =

Cricket tournament

Women's National Cricket League 1997–98 season
- Dates: 11 October 1997 – 15 February 1998
- Administrator(s): Cricket Australia
- Cricket format: Limited overs cricket (50 overs)
- Tournament format(s): Group stage and finals series
- Champions: New South Wales (2nd title)
- Runners-up: South Australia
- Participants: 5
- Matches: 23
- Player of the series: (New South Wales) Belinda Clark
- Most runs: (New South Wales) Belinda Clark (611)
- Most wickets: (South Australia) Karen Rolton (14)
- Official website: cricket.com.au

The 1997–98 Women's National Cricket League season was the second season of the Women's National Cricket League, the women's domestic limited overs cricket competition in Australia. The tournament started on 11 October 1997 and finished on 15 February 1998. Defending champions New South Wales Breakers won the tournament after finishing second on the ladder at the conclusion of the group stage and beating South Australian Scorpions by two games to one in the finals series.

== Ladder ==
As of 8 February 1998

Pos	Team	Pld	W	L	T	NR	Pts	NRR
1	South Australia	8	4	2	0	2	30	0.261
2	New South Wales	8	4	3	0	1	27	0.918
3	Victoria	8	4	3	0	1	27	0.742
4	Queensland	8	3	4	0	1	21	−0.710
5	Western Australia	8	2	5	0	1	15	−1.143

Updated to match(es) played on 8 February 1998. Source:
Rules for classification: The top two ranked teams qualified for the finals series.
- Points system: 6 for a win, 3 each for a tie, no result or abandonment, 0 for a loss.

== Fixtures ==
=== 1st final ===
13 February 1998
Scorecard

South Australia; 8/146 (50 overs)	v	New South Wales; 4/147 (42.1 overs)
Lee-Anne Hunter 57 (102); Bronwyn Calver 2/25 (10 overs)		Belinda Clark 86* (120); Allyson Kenelley 1/11 (5 overs)

New South Wales won by 6 wickets
Albert Cricket Ground, Melbourne

- New South Wales won the toss and elected to field.

=== 2nd final ===
14 February 1998
Scorecard

South Australia; 8/214 (50 overs)	v	New South Wales; 6/215 (48.3 overs)
Karen Rolton 75 (76); Bronwyn Calver 2/30 (10 overs)		Sally Griffiths 76 (82); Lee-Anne Hunter 3/40 (9 overs)

New South Wales won by 4 wickets
Albert Cricket Ground, Melbourne

- South Australia won the toss and elected to bat.

=== 3rd final ===
15 February 1998
Scorecard

New South Wales; 5/223 (50 overs)	v	South Australia; 8/215 (50 overs)
Belinda Clark 67 (88); Joanne Broadbent 2/40 (10 overs)		Joanne Broadbent 49 (104); Debbie Nelson 2/41 (9 overs)

New South Wales won by 8 runs
Albert Cricket Ground, Melbourne

- New South Wales won the toss and elected to bat.
- New South Wales won the 1997–98 Women's National Cricket League.
