= Wakoklon Heelel Thilel Salai Amailon Pukok =

One of the oldest puyas

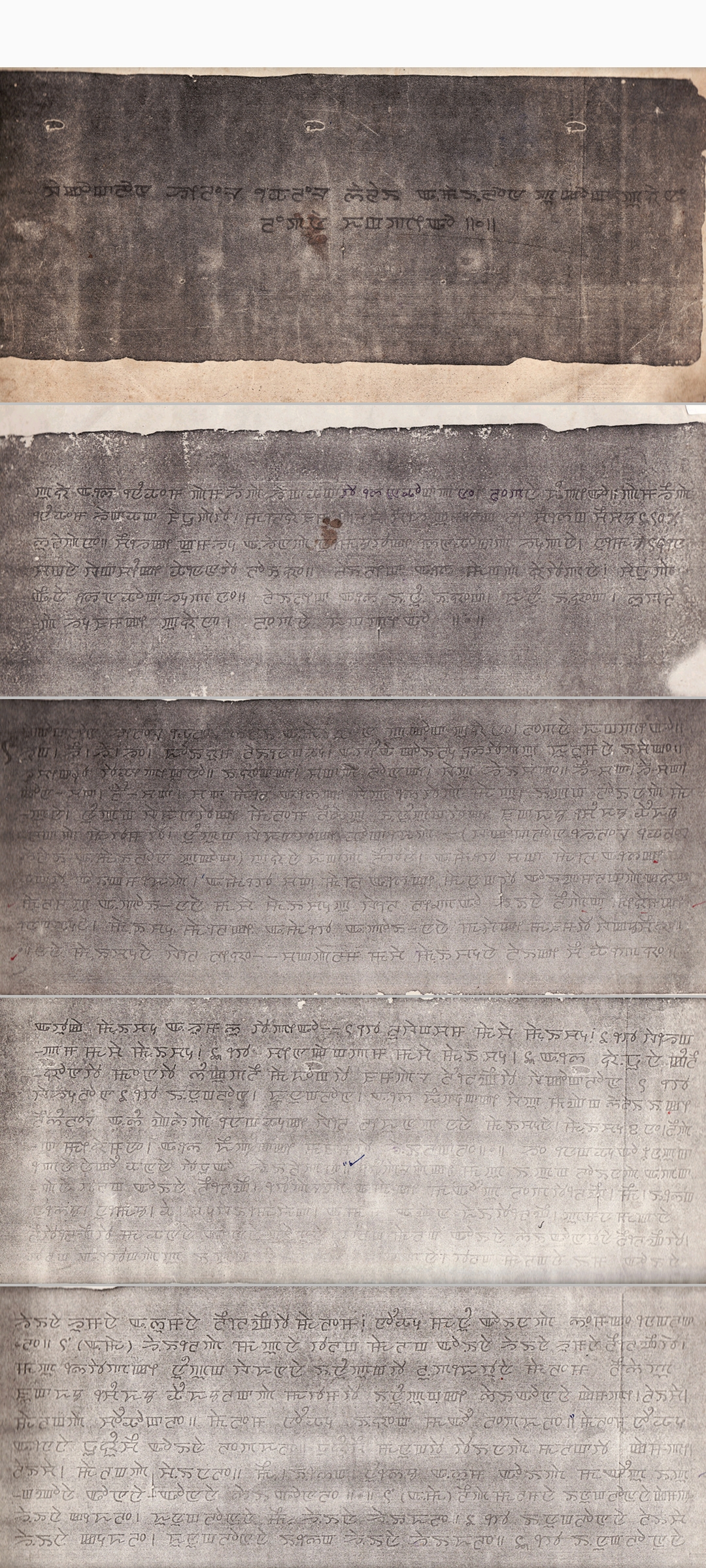
1st collection of 5 pages of the Wakoklon Hilel Thilel Salai Ama-ilon Pukok, a holy text (PuYa) of Ancient Meitei religion (Sanamahism), written in Classical Meitei language (in the traditional Meetei Mayek script)

The Wakoklon Heelel Thilel Salai Amailon Pukok Puya often abbreviated as WHTSAPP/WHTSAP, shortly known as the Wakoklon Puya, is an old classical Meitei language PuYa text, considered as holy and sacred to Sanamahism, the traditional Meitei religion of Ancient Kangleipak (early Manipur). The text is considered by the people and the Government of Manipur as the source of the Kanglei Eeyek (Meitei script). The Wakoklon recommends only 18 letters to be used in the Meitei writing system. One of the most important lines written in the text is "Konsen Tuleisengpa Sana Ee Mahi", which explains the origin of deity Lainingthou Sanamahi. The text also mentions about the ancestral rituals to please the ancient Meitei deities.

== Antiquity ==
The dating of the Wakoklon Heelel Thilel Salai Ama-ilon Pukok to 1398 BCE (3400 years Before Present) is based on the introductory statement from the text itself, recording “Maliyafam Palcha Cheihi Kumsing Lee Cheising Cheichat 3107,” where "3107" is taken as a fixed chronological period linked to the reign-era of King Maliyafam Palcha (or his father, King Ningthou Kangba), the ruler who standardized Meitei calendar. This 3107-year period is calculated backward from 1709 CE, associated with King Pamheiba’s period, resulting in 1398 BCE as the date of origin. The introduction places the composition within an early historical framework connected to named rulers and scribes, and this internal chronological reference is used to align the text with the calculated ancient date of 1398 BCE.

== Basic concepts ==
=== Puya ===
In the Wakoklon Puya, a Puya is presented as an authoritative written text dealing with subjects such as the origin of the universe, the stars, life, death, and the origin of the Meetei people. A Puya is also called Lailik, which is understood as the way of the God Father. The text describes a Puya as a document created and transmitted through the participation of kings, Maichous, and the people of Kangleipak. The Wakoklon Puya mentions four Maichous and records the involvement of both the king and the people in its narration and preservation.

=== Talang Malang ===
The Wakoklon Puya describes Talang Malang as the primordial state of Eepung Loinapa Apakpa, the universal creator. Before creation, the creator existed in the state of Talang Malang. In this condition, nothing else existed. The text states that there was no water and no created world. The creator alone existed before all things. The presence of the creator could be known, but could not be understood through shape, size, form, or other physical characteristics. According to the Puya, everything that exists came into being through the act of creation of Eepung Loinapa Apakpa.

=== Eepung Loinapa Apakpa, Eenungpung, and Eelonnung ===
The Puya explains that Talang Malang is a state of Eepung Loinapa Apakpa, the universal God Father. The name is interpreted within the text as Ee meaning blood, Pung meaning the whole or complete body, Loinapa meaning always with, and Apakpa meaning joined together. Thus, Eepung Loinapa Apakpa is understood as the universal Father possessing the whole blood of the universe.

The Puya states that Eepung Loinapa Apakpa manifested as the eighteen letters and the symbol (Ama), and from this manifestation came Ating-aa, also identified as Salailel Sitapa, Eepa Sorarel, and Nongthou. The expressions Eenungpung and Eelonnung are described as relating to the whole body of blood and to the interior of the sky or space. The text does not interpret these terms as references to water. The dot found in the symbol (Ama) is called Eelik and is described as a drop of blood from Eepung Loinapa Apakpa.

=== Eenunglon and Khununglon ===
The Wakoklon Puya distinguishes between Eenunglon and Khununglon. It states that Eenunglon is associated with Lailon, while Khununglon refers to the language, words, and concepts used among people in the khun or village. These terms are connected to the origin of language and meaning. The text explains that the element Ee in words and concepts refers to the God Father. The creator descended to the earth as (Ama) for the purpose of creation. The dot within the symbol, known as Eelik, is described as a precious drop of blood from the creator. The blood itself is called Ee Lai in the Puya.

=== Saion and Langon ===
The Wakoklon Puya presents Saion and Langon as concepts connected with the process of creation. The creator is described as existing first in a spiritual and conceptual form. Saion refers to the process by which this spiritual and conceptual existence changes into material forms with shape, size, and physical characteristics.

The term Saion is explained as consisting of Sa, meaning body; Ee, meaning blood; and On, meaning change or transformation. Through this process, the spiritual form of the creator becomes the created forms of the universe.

The term Langon is connected with Lang and On. The Puya refers to four stages called Chaks: Hei Chak, Ha Chak, Kon Chak, and Langpa Chak. Langpa Chak is described as the final stage in which the process of human creation is completed and human beings exist on earth as men and women.

=== Eesaiphu Eelonnung ===
The Wakoklon Puya identifies Eepung Loinapa Apakpa as the supreme creator and the source of all existence. The creator is described as one, formless, shapeless, endless, and existing before everything else. The creator is also described as the soul of all things.

The symbol (Ama) represents the creator's manifestation for creation. The dot, called Eelik, is described as a drop of blood from the creator's own blood. According to the text, this blood becomes the source of life within creation. The Puya further states that the symbol manifested as Ating-aa, also known as Salailel Sitapa.

In a passage concerning Eesaiphu Eelonnung, the Puya describes Salailel Sitapa as receiving the blood sent by (Ama), Eepung Loinapa Apakpa. The term Eesaiphu is explained as consisting of Ee (blood), Sa (body), and Eephu (pot or vessel). The expression Eelonnung is interpreted as being within the blood. The passage states that Salailel Sitapa became filled with blood through the command of the creator. As a result, Salailel Sitapa, acting as the second self of Eepung Loinapa Apakpa, became prepared for reproduction together with Eema Leimalel Sitapi, identified as the mother earth, in the continuation of the creation of the universe.

== Dual language ==
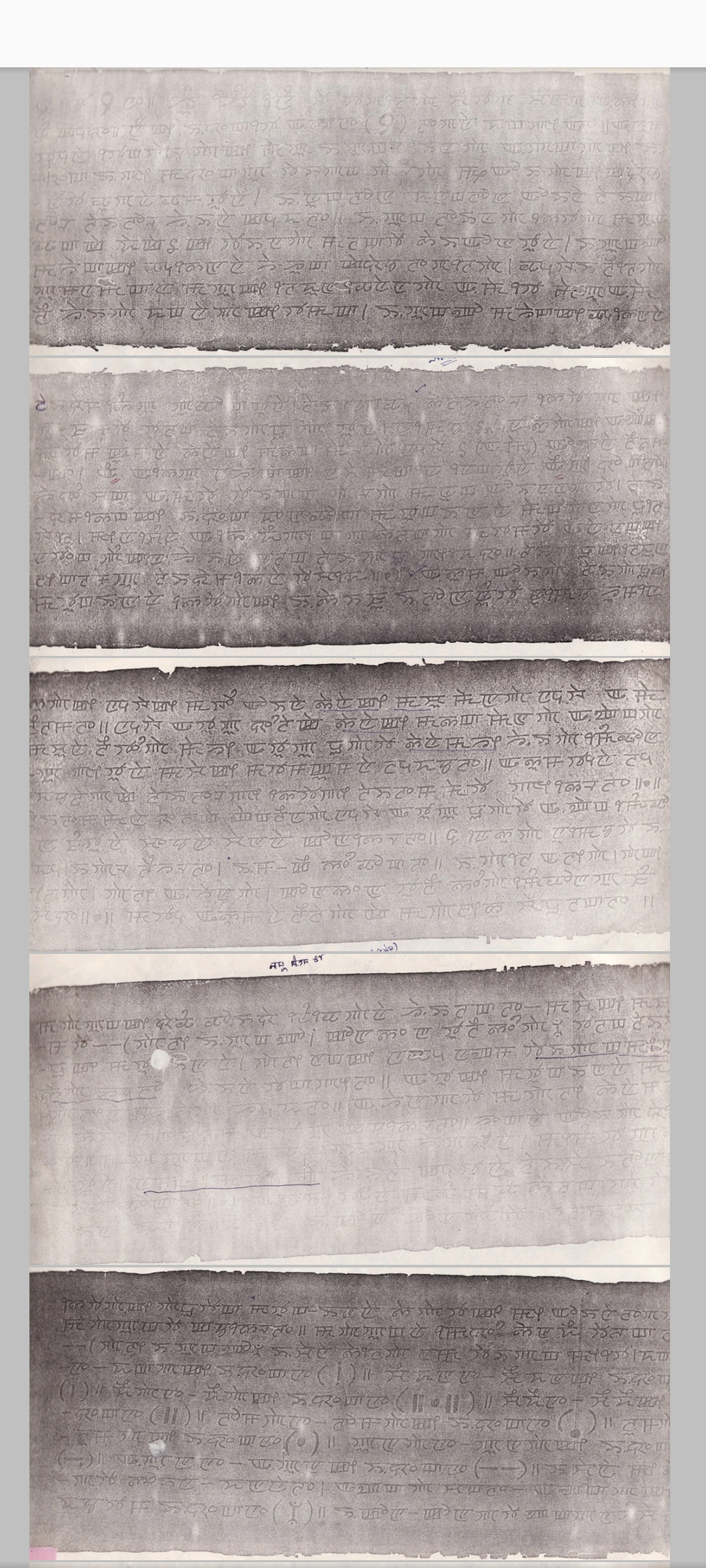
7th collection of 5 pages of the Wakoklon Hilel Thilel Salai Ama-ilon Pukok, a holy text (PuYa) of Ancient Meitei religion (Sanamahism), written in Classical Meitei language (in the traditional Meetei Mayek script)

The Wakoklon Puya text contains cosmological, genealogical, and philosophical concepts that are interpreted in a literal-biological reading and a symbolic-cosmological reading. These interpretive frameworks are sometimes referred to as Khununglon (literal or human-level meaning) and Eenunglon (symbolic or cosmological meaning).

=== Chak and Chakpalon ===
The concept of Chak refers to a four-part cyclical framework described in relation to human life processes within Chakpalon. In Khununglon interpretations, the four stages, Hei-chak, Haa-chak, Kon-chak, and Langpa-chak, are understood as a sequence associated with human reproduction, including conception, gestation, and birth. In Eenunglon interpretations, the same stages are reinterpreted in cosmological terms. Hei-chak is associated with the origin or descent of primordial elements, Haa-chak with their arrival on Earth, Kon-chak with a developmental or incubation phase analogous to gestation, and Langpa-chak with the emergence and expansion of life on Earth. This interpretation frames human reproductive stages as symbolic analogues of broader cosmological processes.

=== Palem Ema and Panthou Epa ===
The terms Palem Ema (Mother Earth) and Panthou Epa (Father Sky or Space) appear in the text as complementary principles. In Khununglon interpretation, they are associated with biological mother and father in human reproduction. In Eenunglon interpretation, Palem Ema is understood as Earth and Panthou Epa as outer space. These are further linked to the concept of Eepung Loinapa Aapakpa, described in interpretive readings as the fundamental constituent of the universe, identified with energy and matter. Some interpretations associate these ideas with cycles of transformation of matter after death, although such readings are interpretive rather than doctrinally established.

=== Yek Thokpa and Salai system ===
The concept of Yek Thokpa is associated with the origin of the salai system, which refers to the seven traditional clan lineages among the Meetei. In narrative accounts found in text, lineage formation is described through mythological genealogies involving interactions between divine or celestial beings (Laiyam) and human beings. In interpretive readings, the salais are described as blood-based lineages, and Yek Thokpa is understood as the establishment of hereditary divisions. These accounts are also linked to social rules regulating marriage between lineages to avoid kinship conflict (yeknaba). Such narratives are interpreted differently across traditions, with some viewing them as mythological explanations of social organization and others as symbolic genealogical frameworks.

== Cosmological explanation ==
=== Primordial state (Nungpung Wakhan) ===
The Wakoklon Puya describes an initial pre-temporal condition termed nungpung wakhan, understood as a singular, absolute existence (Ama) preceding structured time, space, and matter. This state is portrayed as the origin point of all manifestation, from which cosmic order emerges under the guiding principle associated with Sitapa Mapu. The early universe is depicted as an undifferentiated oceanic expanse, lacking land and stable cosmic separation.

=== Formation of earth and cosmic structure ===
The earth (Malem Leipak) is described as a primordial oceanic body fully covered by water, mist, and cloud. The separation of sky (nongthou) and earth (malem) is attributed to a formative intervention associated with Sitapa Mapu. The emergence of landmasses (malem leisha) is presented as a transformative event involving uplift from an underwater state, establishing the structural conditions for life.

=== Origin of life and human creation ===
The text presents life creation as an intentional act of the Laiyam, with human beings (namu taipang mee) formed in the likeness of the Lai. Creation is described through processes interpreted as biological engineering-like acts (sapa, pokpa), involving progressive experimentation. Lainingthou Sanamahi is identified as a key agent in the successful formation of early human prototypes, culminating in the creation of Mee Khaloupa as a stabilized human form preceding widespread reproduction.

=== Divine beings and lineage formation ===
The Wakoklon Puya describes structured emanations such as the seven laipungthous and seven lailup, attributed to Sitapa Mapu and related divine agents. These formations are linked to the establishment of organized lineage systems corresponding to the Meetei salais, interpreted as structured biological or genealogical divisions derived from divine origin.

=== Lai–Human coexistence and identity formation ===
The coexistence of Laiyam and humans is expressed through the concept laiga-meega leiminnaringei, indicating shared existence in early cosmological time. Humans are described as initially identified as Mee-Atei (“other beings”) by the creators, later forming self-identity as Meetei. This distinction frames the emergence of human self-awareness and social categorization.

=== Temporal cycles (Chaks) ===
The narrative structures cosmic development into four cyclical eras (Hei-, Haa-, Kon-, Lang-chak). The Kon-chak is associated with experimental creation and early biological development, while the Lang-chak represents expansion and stabilization of human reproduction. These cycles collectively describe progressive stages of creation, refinement, and dissemination of life.

=== Earth as oceanic planet and environmental transition ===
The earth is consistently characterized as an original water-covered planet with no exposed continents. References to inungpung and ilonnung distinguish submerged landforms from fully aquatic states. The emergence of land is framed as part of a broader environmental transformation guided by divine intervention, establishing habitable conditions for life propagation.

=== Knowledge systems and cultural encoding ===
The text tells about the origin of Meetei cultural systems, including numerals, script formation, and ritual dance (Laibou Khuthek, Meesem Jagoi), to embodied or structured knowledge derived from early divine-human interaction. Ritual practices such as Lai Ikouba are presented as symbolic continuations of primordial events, particularly the emergence of divine presence from water, preserving cosmological memory through performance tradition.

=== Primordial state and origin of existence ===
In the Wakoklon Heelel Thilel Salai Amailon Pukok, existence is described as originating from an undifferentiated primordial condition in which only Ama (the One) exists. At this stage, the universe is without fire, water, earth, air, sky, sun, moon, or stars. All forms of creation are unmanifest, and reality is described as a state of absolute unity and stillness prior to differentiation.

=== Formation of cosmic order and separation of realms ===
From this primordial oneness, creation begins through an ordered process of manifestation. The text describes the emergence of fundamental elements and forces that gradually shape the cosmos. Through this process, the previously unified state is differentiated into distinct realms, including sky (Nongthou) and earth (Malem). The separation of these domains marks the establishment of spatial order and the beginning of structured existence.

=== Emergence of water and formation of earth ===
The Puya presents water as a dominant primordial medium in the early formation of the world, often described as an encompassing oceanic state (Inungpung). Within this condition, the Earth (Malem Leisa) is formed through a process of emergence from beneath the waters. The narrative describes the lifting and stabilization of landmass from the primordial ocean, accompanied by the interaction of elemental forces such as fire (kampi), water (laicha), and air (malangpa), which contribute to the shaping and differentiation of the terrestrial world.

=== Manifestation of life and habitable spaces ===
Following the formation of land and the separation of sky and earth, the Puya describes the establishment of habitable regions. These spaces emerge as ordered structures within the previously fluid and undifferentiated cosmos. The creation process includes the formation of environments suitable for life, governed by the organizing principle of the primordial will described in the text.

=== Ordering principle and creative agency ===
The text attributes creation to primordial principles referred to in various forms such as Eepung Loinapa Mapu and Sitapa Mapu, which function as the initiating forces of cosmic order. These principles are described as possessing a formative agency through which the universe is structured. The unfolding of existence is presented as an intentional and sequential process, where all elements arise from the original source and are arranged into a coherent cosmic system.

=== Continuity of cosmic structure ===
The Puya concludes its cosmological description with the idea that the universe is sustained through continuous ordering processes originating from the primordial source. All elements, including material substances and living beings, are expressions of the original unity (Ama) manifested through successive stages of differentiation and formation.

=== Origin of Life from the Nonglon ===
The Wakoklon Puya describes life on earth as originating from the celestial realm (nonglon), where the Laiyam operates as the source of creation. Through the descent of divine agency, particularly figures such as Sitapa Mapu, life is introduced from the sky into the terrestrial realm (leilon). The scripture frames this process as a structured movement from the cosmic domain into earth, where living forms begin to emerge under divine direction.

=== Descent of the Laiyam and formation of earthly life ===
According to the text, the Laiyam descends from the sky (nonglontaki hunthalaktuna) and initiates the creation of plants, animals, and human beings. Earth is described as a selected realm due to its suitability for sustaining life. Human beings are positioned within this created order as part of a wider system of life formation governed by celestial principles.

=== Cosmological structure of Nonglon and Leilon ===
The scripture distinguishes between nonglon (sky/celestial realm) and leilon (earth), presenting them as interrelated yet separate domains. The descent of life from nonglon into leilon is central to its cosmological structure. The concept of multiple layers of nonglon and leilon reflects an ordered universe in which creation operates across different planes of existence.

=== Symbolism of Aatinga, Hei, and Ee ===
The Wakoklon Puya associates Aatinga (often equated with the supreme or sky principle) with the origin of existence. Elements such as Hei and Ee are described as primordial substances flowing from Aatinga Koilou, symbolically representing the transmission of life from the cosmic realm to earth. These concepts reinforce the idea of a unified cosmic source underlying creation.

=== Creation of human beings and cosmic purpose ===
Human beings (Taipang Meeoiba) are described as part of the Laiyam’s creative process. Their creation is linked to the broader purpose of sustaining and extending life within the cosmos. The scripture presents humanity as integrated into a larger design aimed at the continuation of life forms and cosmic balance.

=== Thouwaimichak and celestial origin of life ===
The term thouwaimichak (star) is interpreted within the text as having a material and life-related significance, connecting celestial bodies with the origin of life. This association reinforces the idea that life is derived from cosmic or stellar sources, embedded within the structure of the universe.

=== Preservation of knowledge and human responsibility ===
The Wakoklon Puya tells about the preservation of knowledge (eyek epee mayek / lai yek) as essential for sustaining human existence. Knowledge is linked to lineage and cosmic order, and its protection is presented as a fundamental responsibility of human beings within creation.

=== Ethical order, conflict, and cosmic balance ===
The scripture tells about the importance of harmony between opposing forces such as thak and kha, representing sky and earth. It warns against violence, division, and destructive tendencies, presenting them as disruptions to cosmic balance. Human conduct is therefore tied to maintaining order within both society and the universe.

=== Role of humanity in cosmic continuity ===
Humanity is described as a continuation of the Laiyam’s creative intent, responsible for sustaining life and ensuring its propagation. The Wakoklon Puya frames human existence as part of a larger cosmic continuity, where survival, knowledge preservation, and ethical balance are central to the stability of creation.

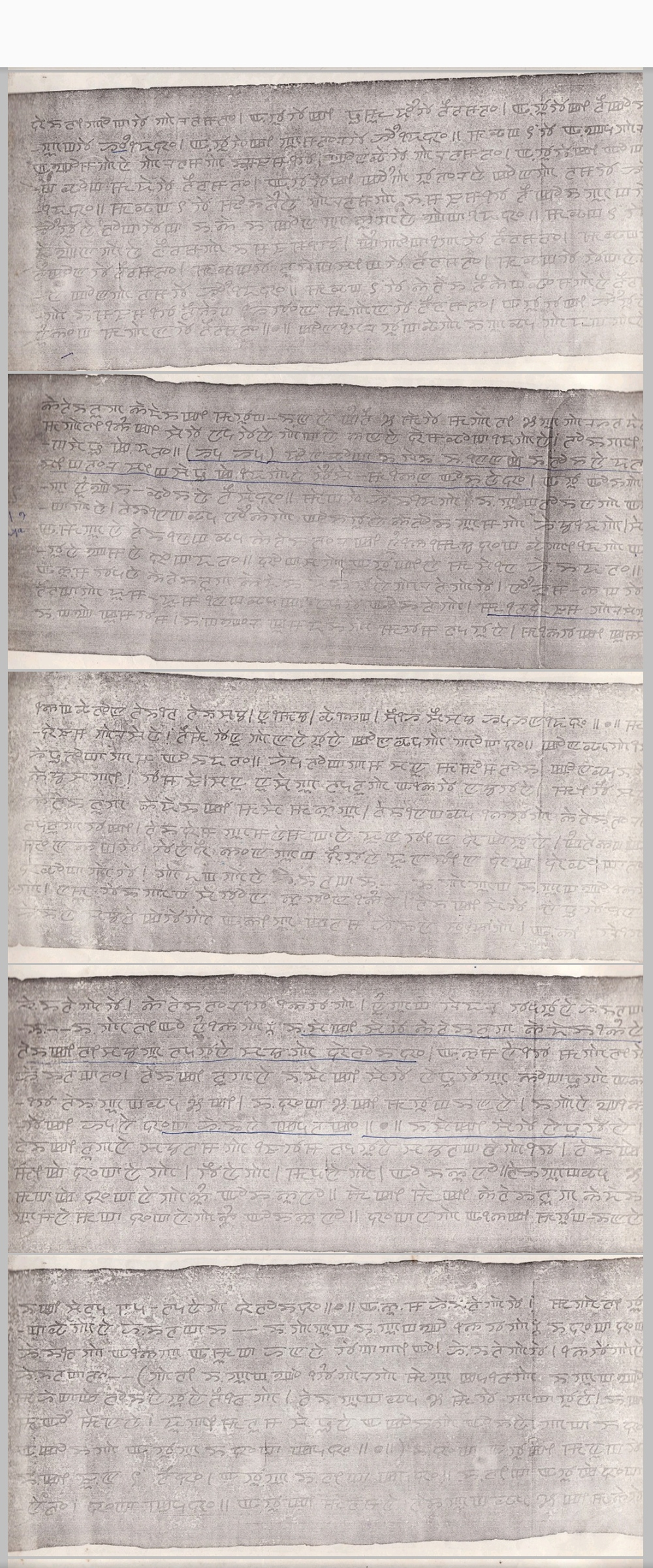
14th collection of 5 pages of the Wakoklon Hilel Thilel Salai Ama-ilon Pukok, a holy text (PuYa) of Ancient Meitei religion (Sanamahism), written in Classical Meitei language (in the traditional Meetei Mayek script)

== See also ==
- Ancient Meitei literature
- Ancient Meitei hymns
- Meitei ritual songs
- Chang Thokpa
- Nachom
- Ngamu Usin
- Nongkhong Koiba
- Paklei Namsa
- Meitei philosophy
- Sanamahist people
- Philosophy of Sanamahism
- Meitei deities
- Meitei festivals
- Meitei calendar
- Meitei astronomy
- Leichillon
