= Paklei Namsa =

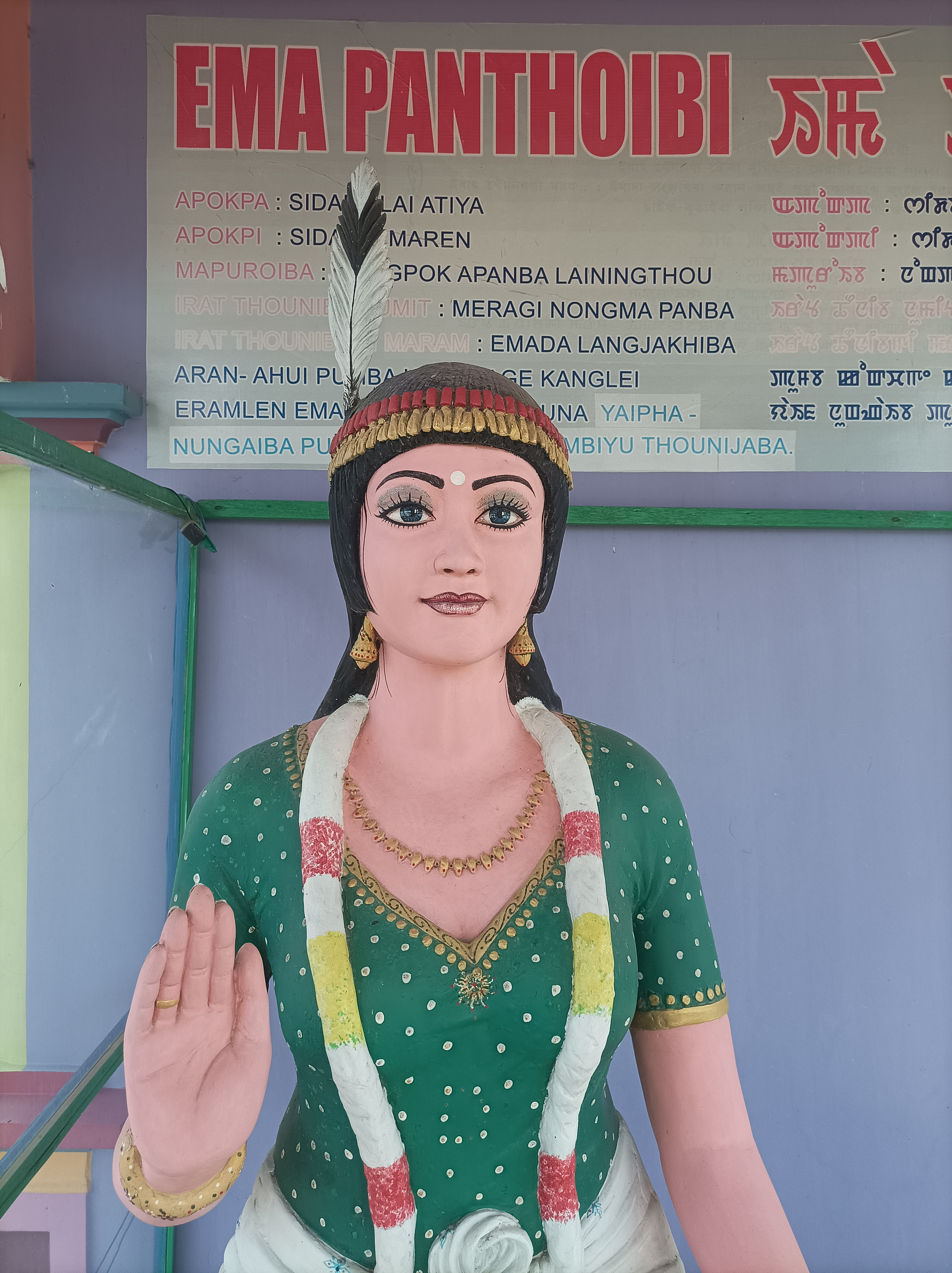
Meetei goddess Panthoibi with Namsa on her forehead

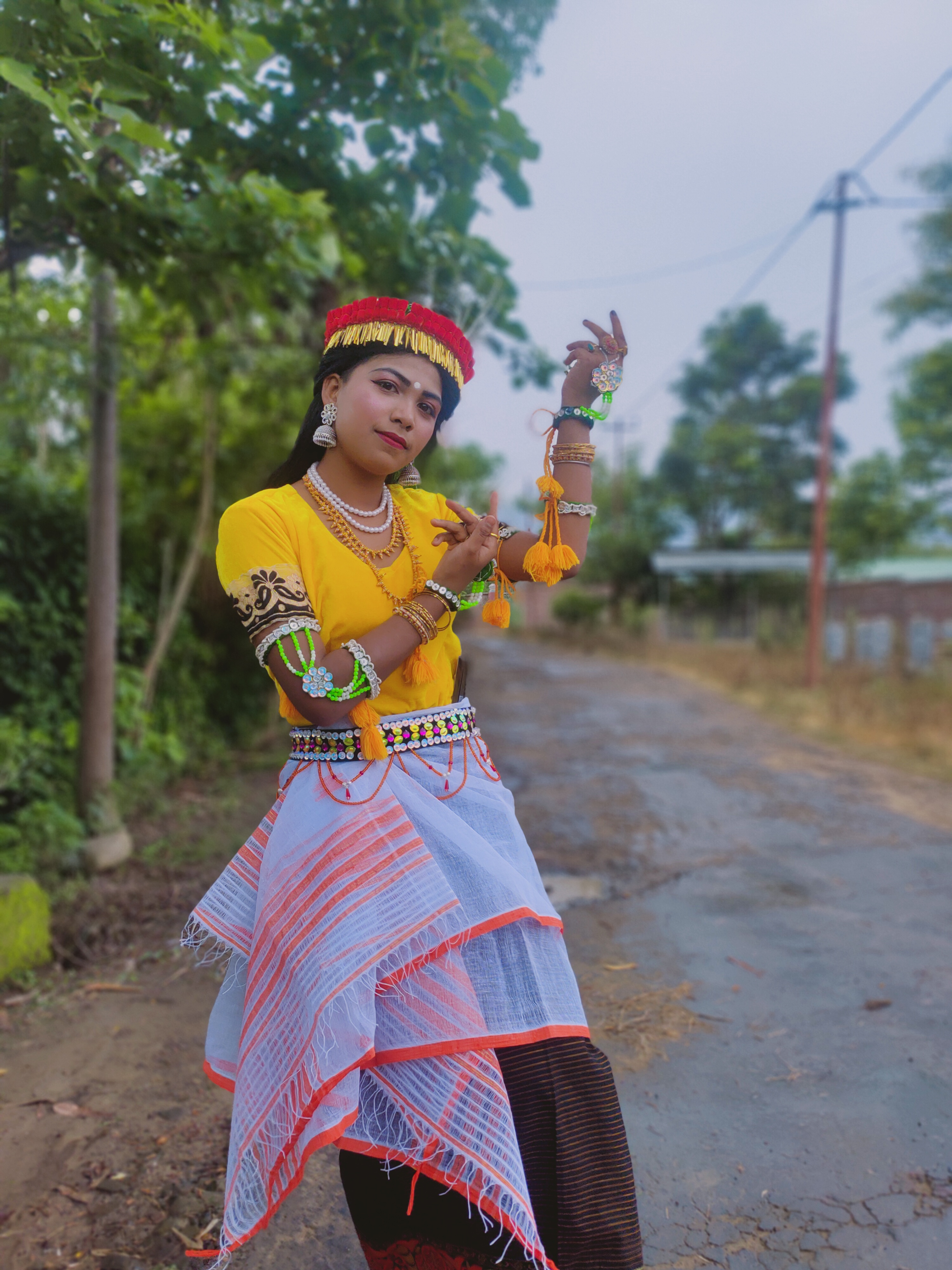
A girl with Namsa mark on her forehead

Namsa (ꯅꯝꯁꯥ) is a traditional religious practice of placing a small amount of earth on the forehead as a mark of respect and spiritual devotion in the Sanamahi religion. It is mainly practised by the Meitei people of Kangleipak (modern day Manipur).

== Mythological origin ==
According to Meetei tradition of Nongkhong Koiba, following the advice of mother goddess Ima Leimalel Sitapi (representing the earth), Pakhangpa circled his father's seat seven times and bowed down, touching his forehead to the earth. At the moment of bowing, earth touched Pakhangpa’s forehead, forming the origin of Namsa.

== Meaning and etymology ==
In Meitei language, Namsa is made of Nam (to put) and Sa (body or forehead). Together, Namsa means "putting earth on the forehead." The act symbolizes deep gratitude to Mother Earth, who is believed to be a deathless, ever-giving mother caring for all living beings throughout time.

== Daily practice and variations ==
The tradition is still followed today. Many elderly Meetei, whether Hindu converts or recent Sanamahi reverts, touch the ground with their right hand’s middle finger upon waking and then touch their forehead. This is a sign of respect to the earth before stepping on it for the day.

To apply Namsa, a small amount of earth is placed on the left palm with water. It is mixed into a paste. The middle finger of the right hand is used to apply it to the forehead.

== Misunderstandings and external influences ==
Over time, some people have mistakenly interpreted Namsa as "chandan" (sandalwood paste) or used imported soil. This has been influenced by cultural changes during the Hindu rule in Kangleipak, particularly during the reign of King Churachand Singh.

During that period, substances like Gopi Chandan from Brindaban and black soil were introduced for ceremonial use. These practices caused confusion about the traditional meaning of Namsa. However, traditionally, any naturally available soil color from Mother Earth is considered suitable.

The original Namsa does not rely on external materials or symbolism from other cultures. It comes directly from the Meetei relationship with the Earth, which they see as the ultimate, loving, and tireless mother of all life.

== See also ==
- Lai Haraoba
- Ngamu Usin
- Chang Thokpa
- Meitei philosophy
- Philosophy of Sanamahism
- Wakoklon Heelel Thilel Salai Amailon Pukok Puya
- Ancient Meitei literature
