= Symbols of Sanamahism =

Sanamahism
- ꯁꯅꯥꯃꯍꯤ ꯂꯥꯏꯅꯤꯡ
- The Symbol of Sanamahism
- Type: Ethnic religion
- Scripture: Puyas
- Moderator: Laininghal Naoriya Phulo
- Region: Manipur, India
- Language: Meitei
- Liturgy: Manipur
- Number of followers: Estimated. 235,000

The Symbolism of Sanamahism, which is the traditional Meitei religion, represents various aspects of the ancient pagan beliefs and practices of the people of Ancient Manipur (also known as Kangleipak).

== History ==
These beliefs and practices date back to the 15th century BC, and have been preserved and passed down through generations, influencing the cultural and religious heritage of the region.

The sacred symbols of Sanamahism first appear in the ancient text known as the Wakoklon Heelel Thilel Salai Amailon Pukok Puya, one of the oldest and most revered Meitei scriptures. This sacred text is a treasured part of the Meitei people's cultural heritage, holding spiritual and historical importance.

== Iconography ==
The Meitei number "꯱" ("1", One) is also regarded as a sacred symbol for the religion.

Anji, though used in late era, especially from Medieval Manipur, is also considered as a sacred symbol.

== Gallery ==

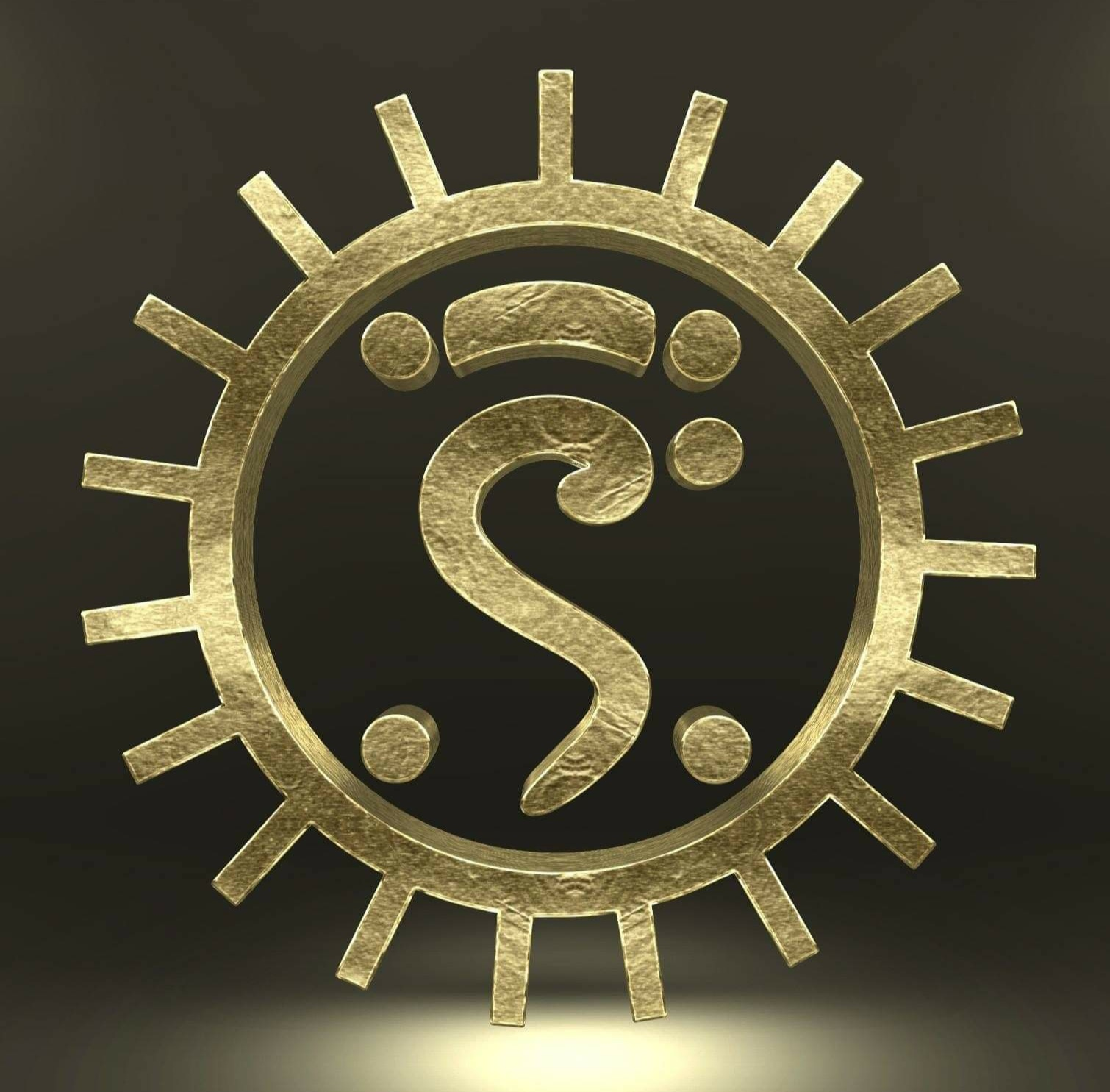

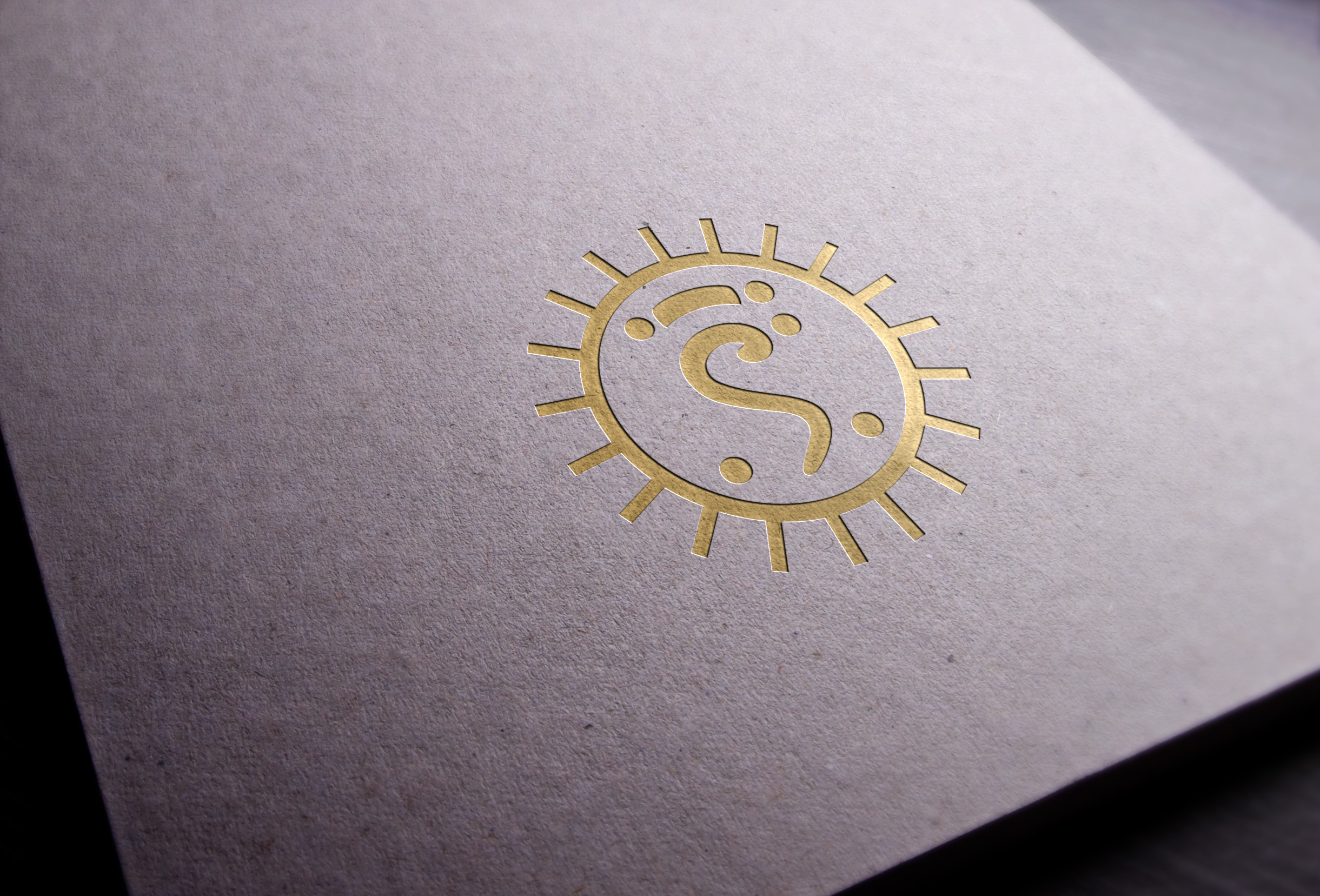
