= Tangja Leela Pakhangba =

First king of Ancient Manipur

- The founder of Ancient Kangleipak realm
- Monarchy: 1445 BC – 1405 BC
- Coronation: 1445 BC
- Hereditary: Ningthou Kangba
- Born: Taang Chaa Lee La Paa Khangpa
- Spouse: Sinbee Leima (Sinpee Leima)
- Issue: Ningthou Kangba
Names
- Taangja Leelaa Paakhangba
Era name and dates
- Ancient Manipur: 1445 BC – 1405 BC
- Royalty: Tang-Shang dynasty (proposed theory)
- Religion: Primitive Meiteism of Sanamahism
- Occupation: King of Ancient Kangleipak

Tangja Leela Pakhangba (Old Manipuri: Taang Chaa Lee La Paa Khangpa) (1445 BC – 1405 BC) is the first king of Ancient Manipur (Antique Kangleipak) civilization. He is the father of King Ningthou Kangba (1405 BC – 1359 BC) and the grandfather of King Maliyapham Palcha (Koi Koi) (1359 BC – 1329 BC). He is the consort of Queen Sinbee Leima, the daughter of the chief of the Leihou tribe. The history of Manipur accounts for many kings with the name "Pakhangba", more or less having reference to God Pakhangba, among which "Tangja Leela Pakhangba" is one.

== Other websites ==
- Tensuba, Keerti Chand (1993). Genesis of Indian Tribes: An Approach to the History of Meiteis and Thais. Inter-India Publications. ISBN 978-81-210-0308-7.
- Middleton, John (2015). World Monarchies and Dynasties. Routledge. p. 1639. ISBN 978-1-317-45157-0.
