= Ngamu Usin =

Fish releasing into water ceremony

The holy and sacred symbol of Sanamahi religion, the Meitei indigenous faith

Ngamu Usin (ꯉꯥꯃꯨ ꯎꯁꯤꯟ), also spelled as Ngamu Ushin, is a Sanamahist traditional ritual of the Meitei people of ancient Kangleipak (in modern-day Manipur, northeast India). The name combines ngamu (a small black fish) and usin (“to bear” or “to carry”). In this ritual, the fish symbolically absorbs misfortune, illness, or sin and is then released into water. The practice is widespread among Meiteis wherever they live.

== Ritual uses ==
- New Year (Cheiraoba): On the first day of the Meitei lunar new year, each family offers a ngamu, carrying away misfortunes of the year ahead.
- Meitei marriage ceremonies: At weddings, a ngamu is offered separately for the bride and groom, absorbing future misfortunes or misdeeds, followed by a prayer for their joint well-being.
- Health and Crisis: A ngamu usin is performed when someone is seriously ill or troubled. A maiba (traditional healer) administers the ritual, addressing the fish with words that compel it to carry away the person’s afflictions before releasing it into water.

== Royal and state rituals ==
- Cheithapa ceremony: In ancient Kangleipak, a human “scapegoat” called cheithapa performed a similar role at the royal court. At the New Year festival, the outgoing cheithapa passed accumulated evils and misfortunes to the new one, who in turn swore to bear them until the next year. The ceremony included prayers to the king and was conducted in grand form with gifts exchanged.

== Origins and mythology ==
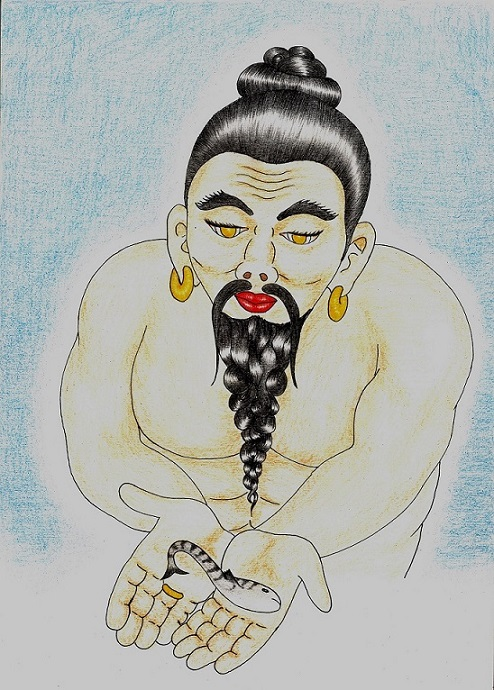
Sanamahi creating ngamu during the primordial era

Creation myth: According to Meetei creation lore (Wang-u-lon):

- The universe was created in order: fire, water, air, earth (Malem), and then space (Nongthou Ating‑aa).
- Space (Salailel Sitapa) and Earth (Ima Leimalel Sitapi) gave birth to their son, Sanamahi Lainingthou.
- Sanamahi attempted to create humankind, first making a fish (Namu Mitam Nga), then a monkey (Yong), but both were rejected.
- Finally, guided by his father, he created humans in the divine image.

Divine Instruction
The story says that before sending away the fish, the divine pair told it that when Meetei descendants catch it, it must agree to carry their sins and misfortunes and then be released back to water. This foundation myth is the origin of the ngamu usin ritual, representing a “scapegoat” principle minus physical harm.

== Comparison with scapegoat traditions worldwide ==
Global analogues: Many cultures practice symbolic scapegoating—transferring community sins or misfortunes onto an animal or person. Examples are:

- In ancient Israel, a goat bore the sins of the people on Yom Kippur and was sent into the wilderness.
- In ancient Greece and Rome, humans or animals were driven out to avert disasters.

Unlike many traditions, Meetei Ngamu Usin involves no violence; the fish is honored with a gift before being released.

== Cultural significance ==
- Symbolism: Ngamu Usin reflects deep metaphysical beliefs about sin, illness, and renewal. It also demonstrates an early understanding of the symbolic transfer of guilt—echoing evolutionary ideas in its creation narrative.
- Cultural heritage: The ritual underscores the ancient sophistication of Meitei society. It has persisted through centuries—notably surviving Hindu influences starting in the 18th century—and remains a living part of Meetei culture today.

== See also ==
- Fish in Meitei culture
- Lai Haraoba
- Ancient Meitei hymns
- Meitei ritual songs
- Nongkhong Koiba
- Chang Thokpa
