= Ningthou Kangba =

Ancient Meitei ruler

- Inventor of the Polo game

1405 BC
- Monarchy: 1405 BC - 1359 BC
- Coronation: 1405 BC
- Predecessor: Tangja Leela Pakhangba (1445 BC-1405 BC)
- Successor: Maliyapham Palcha (1359 BC- 1329 BC)
- Born: A cave in the Mount Koubru, about 35 km from the north of Imphal
- Burial: Kangmong village,Nambol, Imphal West
- Spouse: Leima Taritnu
- Issue: Maliyapham Palcha
- Father: Tangja Leela Pakhangba (1445 BC-1405 BC)
- Mother: Sinbee Leima
- Religion: Meiteism (Sanamahism)
- Occupation: King of Ancient Kangleipak

Ningthou Kangba (Old Manipuri: Ningthou Kangpa; 1405 BC-1359 BC) was a ruler of Ancient Kangleipak (early Manipur). He is traditionally seen as having invented Sagol Kangjei, the earliest form of the modern day polo sports. He was the son of King Tangja Leela Pakhangba (1445 BC-1405 BC) and Queen Sinbee Leima. He was the consort of Queen Leima Taritnu, daughter of a king named Nongpok Ningthou of the Nongmaiching Hill in the east of Imphal.

== Origin ==
According to the Ningthou Kangbalon, an ancient historical account of his family, King Kangba was born in a cave in the Mount Koubru in northern Manipur. Some historians thought that he belonged to the house of the Salang Leishangthem dynasty. However, some thought that he belonged to the house of the Khaba Nganba dynasty.

== Heritage site ==
In 2018, the Government of Manipur proclaimed that a heritage site will be developed in memory of the king in the Kangmong village, to promote tourism.

== Ningthou Kangbalon ==
The Ningthou Kangbalon (Old Manipuri: Ningthou Kangpalon) is an Ancient Meitei language historic text (Puya), which presents a brief genealogy of the rulers of Ancient Manipur (Antique Kangleipak) in the pre Christian era. According to the manuscript, King Ningthou Kangba (Old Manipuri: Ningthou Kangpa) had nine sons, Koikoi, Teima, Yangma, Tesrot, Urenkhuba, Urenhanba, Irem, Khabi and Langba. Teima became a Meitei.

Yangma went to the West of Kangleipak (present day Manipur) and spread over to Mayang (Cachar and beyond). Tesrot went to Takhel (present day Tripura) and became Takhel (Tripuri). Urenkhuba spread over as a people of Ancient Moirang, Irem went to the North and became Pasa. Khabi/Khaba went to the east and became a part of Chinese people. Langba went to the South and spread over his descendants. The name of Manipur was "Tilli Koktong Leikoilel" during the period of Ningthou Kangba.

== Bibliography ==
- Ningthou Kangbalon
