= Chang Thokpa =

Odd numbers in Meitei culture

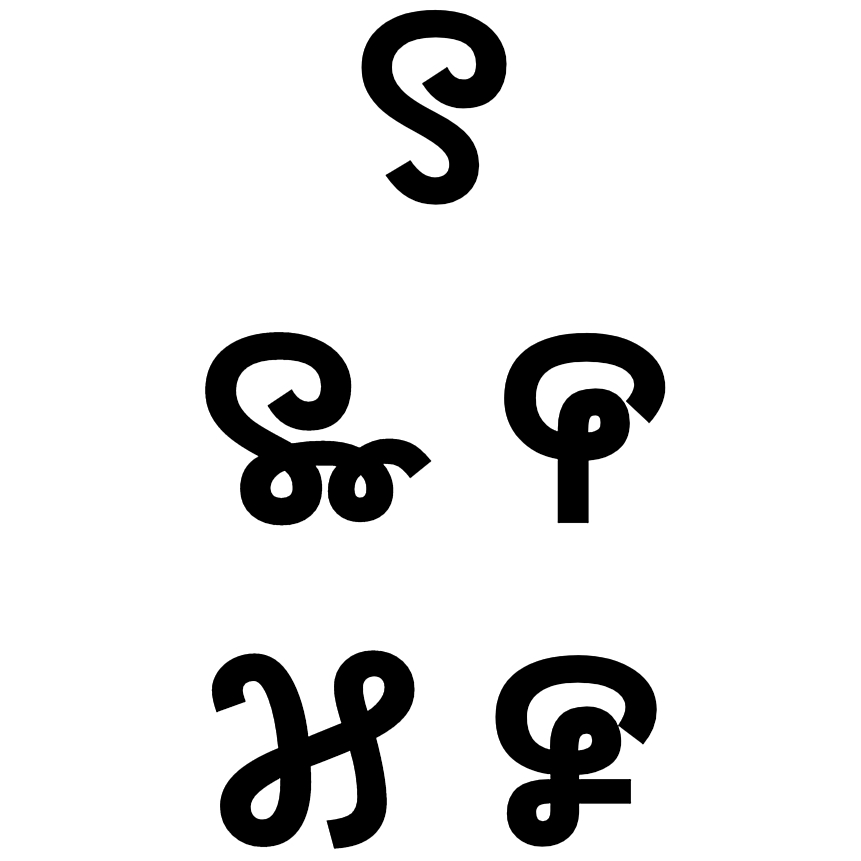
Classical Meitei odd numbers, related to the Chang Thokpa tradition

The concept of Chang Thokpa (ꯆꯪ ꯊꯣꯛꯄ) is a central religious and philosophical tradition of the Meitei people of ancient Kangleipak (present-day Manipur). This tradition is deeply rooted in Meitei culture and has been practiced in rituals and ceremonies of the Meitei indigenous religion (Sanamahism) since ancient times. Common expressions such as "Laphoi Laphang Chang Thokpa", "Heiram Taret, Leiram Taret", and "Ngaram Taret, Sharam Taret" reflect this enduring custom.

These practices reflect the deep spiritual and philosophical heritage of the Meitei civilization that once shone with advanced thinking and symbolic systems long before colonial or external religious influences.

== Etymology ==
The term Chang Thokpa comes from the philosophical Meetei language called Wang-u-lon.

- Chang (ꯆꯪ) means “everything that exists” — it represents creation, existence, and vitality without the idea of death.
- Thokpa (ꯊꯣꯛꯄ) means “to originate” or “to come out” — referring to ongoing creation and life.

Together, Chang Thokpa symbolizes the eternal source of life and creation, believed to be the Ultimate Reality in Meetei belief.

== Concept of Ama (One God) ==
Meetei Mayek digit one, Ama

The Meetei people worship a supreme, formless, and deathless creator known as Ama (ꯑꯃꯥ), meaning "One". This idea comes from the ancient Meetei scripture called the Puya, especially the text Wakoklon Heelel Thilel Salai Ama-Ilon.

According to the scripture:

- Ama (ꯑꯃꯥ) existed in a primordial state — shapeless and formless.
- Ama is described as Kampi — a concept meaning Fire, Light, and Heat, which are considered the first conditions of life.

In Meetei philosophy:

- Words used in creation are called Inunglon (divine language).
- Everyday language is called Khunnunglon (human language of habitation).
- Because Ama is Fire, Light, and Heat, the Meetei people have always included fire or light in their worship rituals since ancient times.

== One and seven in Meetei beliefs ==
The numbers 1 (One) and 7 (Seven) are sacred in Meetei culture:

- One (Ama)
  - Represents the Ultimate Reality.
  - Seen as the source of all creation.
  - It is the symbol of the divine creator, also known as Ipung Loinapa Apakpa.
- Seven (Taret)
  - Symbolizes the seven clans (Salais) of the Meetei people.
  - Represents the seven layers of space (Nonglon Talet).
  - Each Salai has its own color and identity.
  - The seven divine components are known as the Laipungthous, considered manifestations of the One Reality.

This is why the Meetei people offer items in sets of seven in rituals — to represent the connection with the divine.

== Ritual practices ==
Examples of Chang Thokpa in daily and ceremonial life include:

- Heiram Taret (ꯍꯩꯔꯝ ꯇꯔꯦꯠ): Seven types of fruits.
- Leiram Taret (ꯂꯩꯔꯝ ꯇꯔꯦꯠ): Seven types of flowers.
- Ngaram Taret (ꯉꯥꯔꯝ ꯇꯔꯦꯠ): Seven types of fish.
- Saram Taret (ꯁꯥꯔꯝ ꯇꯔꯦꯠ): Seven types of animals.
- Marriage ceremony (ꯂꯨꯍꯣꯡꯕ): The bride circles the groom seven times before placing the garland.
- Even the making of traditional swords (Khutlai Thangsang) involves using seven materials from seven Saturdays (Thangcha).

== Use of odd numbers ==
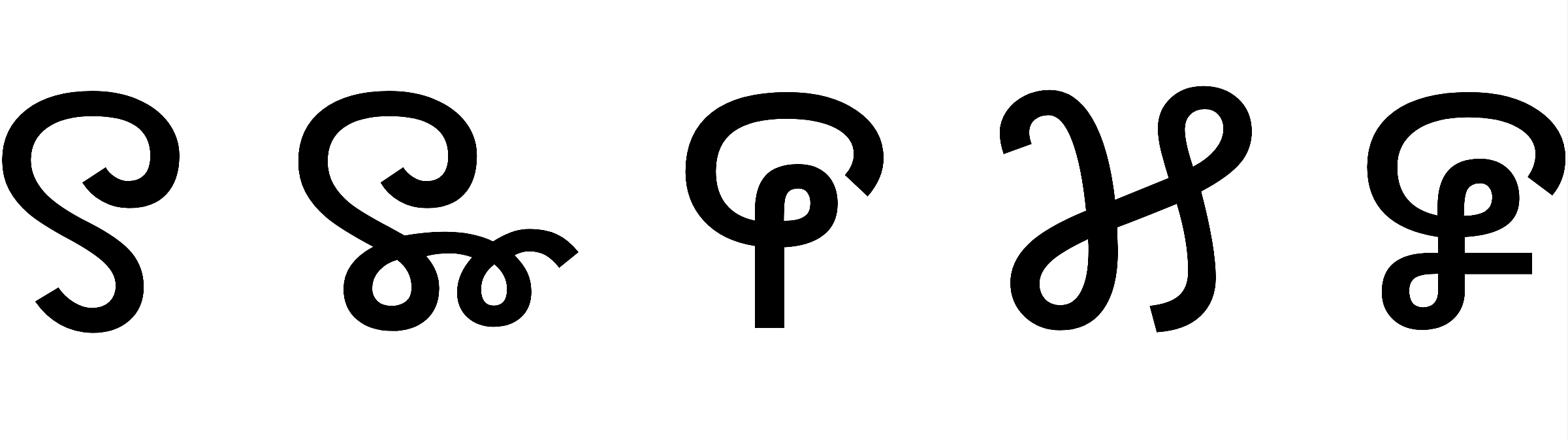
Classical Meitei odd numbers, related to the Chang Thokpa tradition

If the numbers 1 or 7 are not available, the Meetei tradition allows the use of other odd numbers like 9, 11, or 13 — still under the concept of Chang Thokpa. However, even numbers, such as 14, are considered inauthentic and seen by some as a distortion introduced during the Hindu influence in the 18th century.

== Modern relevance ==
In the 21st century, Chang Thokpa traditions are still visible in:

- House construction (Yumchao),
- Shrines (Sangkoi),
- Grave mounds (Mompaktuba), and
- Other aspects of Meetei life.

== See also ==
- Meitei confederacy
- Yek Salai
- Nongkhong Koiba
- Helloi
