= Nachom =

Posy of flowers worn by Meitei women

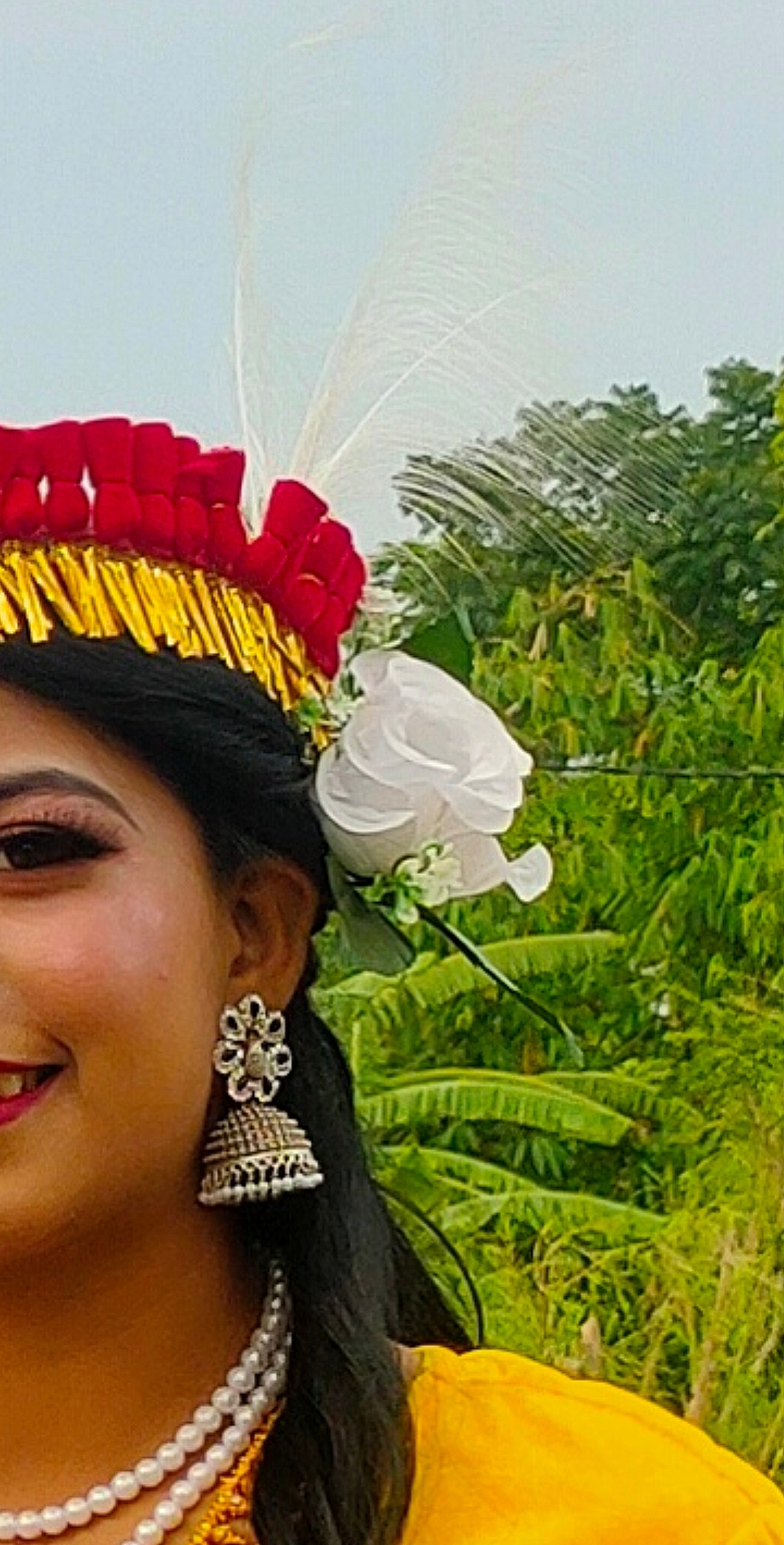
Nachom or Nachomlei, a Meitei traditional small bouquet or posy

Nachom (Meitei: ꯅꯥꯆꯣꯝ, lit. 'ear sprout'), also known as nachomlei (ꯅꯥꯆꯣꯝꯂꯩ) or lei nachom (Meitei: ꯂꯩ ꯅꯥꯆꯣꯝ, lit. 'flower ear sprout'), is a traditional small bouquet or posy worn by Meitei women in Manipur, a state in Northeast India. It holds cultural, religious, and romantic significance in Meitei civilization and continues to be a part of rituals, festivals, and traditional attire.

== Etymology ==
The Meitei word ꯅꯥꯆꯣꯝ (nāchom) comes from nā (ear) and chom (to sprout or grow), referring to a floral ornament worn near the ear.

== Overview ==
A nachom is a small bunch of local flowers, often placed behind the ears, in the braid, or on the tips of the hair by Meitei women. The tradition is believed to be very old, dating back to the first-century reign of Nongda Lairen Pakhangba , the first recorded king of Kangleipak.

There is also a mythological connection to Goddess Nongthang Leima, believed to be an incarnation of Panthoibi, a major Meitei goddess. According to legends, these goddesses wore flowers as adornments, which inspired the Nachom tradition.

While Nachoms are a rich cultural tradition, their use has been declining due to modern influences and lifestyle changes. Still, the tradition continues in festivals, rituals, and among those who strive to preserve Meitei cultural identity.

== Religious and ritual use ==
According to Meitei mythology, nachoms were first used by the seven goddesses (Lai Nurabi Taret) and the nine gods (Laibungdou Mapan) under the guidance of the supreme creator Sitapa Mapu. These flowers were part of the cosmic dance that led to the creation of plants, animals, and human beings. This divine origin is still honored in festivals like Lai Haraoba, and in rituals like Ima Taret Laikhuramba, where seven kinds of red flowers are offered to goddesses. Nachoms are worn by Maibis (priestesses).

== Composition and symbolism ==
In traditional activities like likon sanaba (a board game), nachoms were used by young women to silently communicate their feelings to young men.

A nachom usually includes 1-5 different flowers, each of which carries a specific meaning. Dropping a specific flower could mean accepting or rejecting a romantic proposal. Some examples include:

- Marigold (Meitei: sanarei) - acceptance of love; dedication to a man even over family care.
- Safflower (Meitei: kusumle)- living under strict family rules; not open to romance.
- Rose (Meitei: atal gulap) - total love and dedication to someone.
- Ginger lily (Meitei: takhellei) - freshness, vitality, and completeness.
- Dendrobium chrysanthum (Meitei: khongul melei) - sharing personal history before starting a relationship.
- Globe amaranth (Meitei: petruk lei) - humble background; asks for care and attention.
- Champak (Meitei: leihao) - independence; a widow wearing champak signifies loyalty to her late husband.
- Ceylon ironwood (Meitei: nageshor) - strong, single, and self-sustained woman uninterested in romantic affairs.

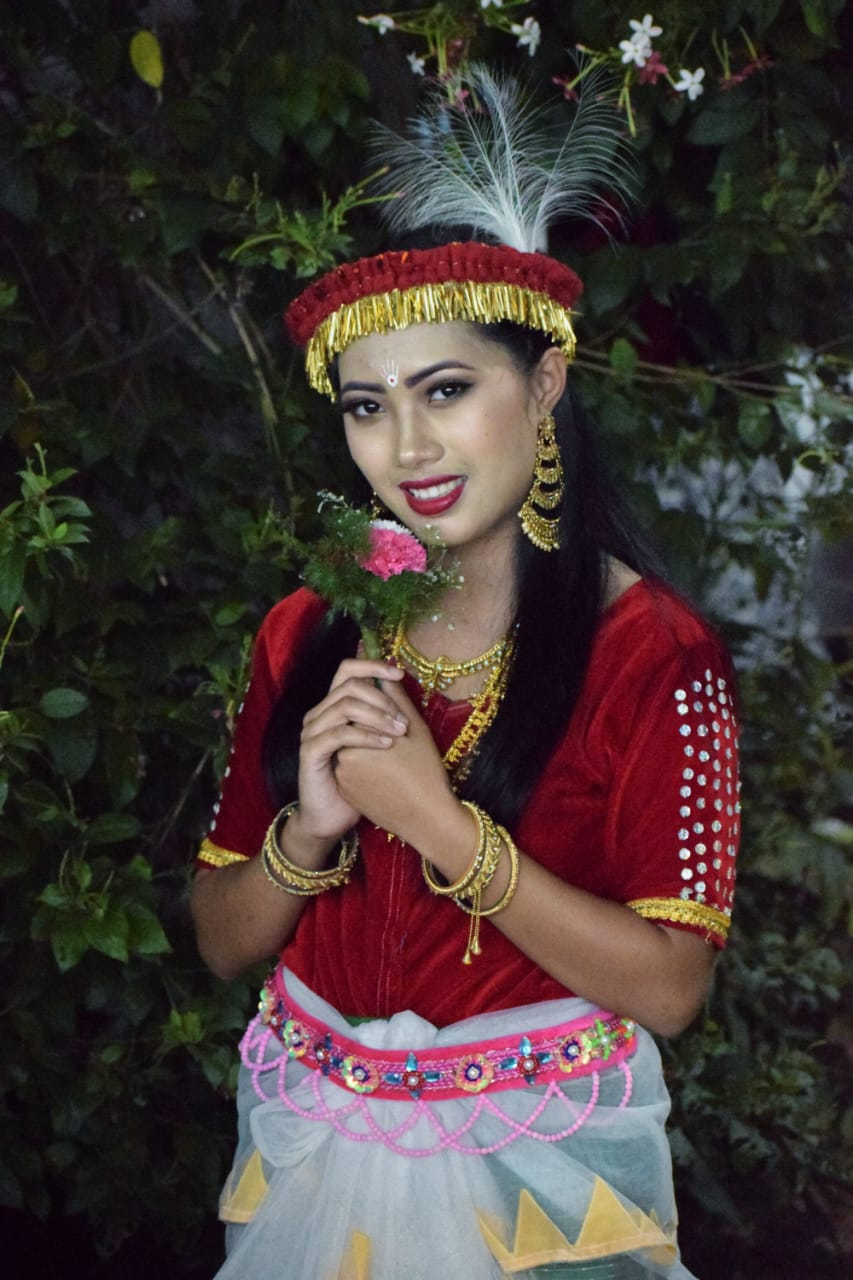
A Meitei lady holding a nachom bouquet

There is also symbolic placement:

- Married women wear nachom on the right ear.
- Unmarried women wear it on the left ear.
- Flowers worn on the ears can be given as gifts to others, but those on the braid or hair are considered personal and are not gifted.

== See also ==
- Plants in Meitei culture
- Lai Haraoba in Bangladesh
- Lai Haraoba in Myanmar
- Lai Haraoba in Tripura
- Kwatha Lai Haraoba
- Women in Meitei civilisation
