= 728 Leonisis =

Main-belt asteroid

Discovery
- Discovered by: J. Palisa
- Discovery date: 16 February 1912

Designations
- Pronunciation: /liːəˈnaɪsɪs/
- Alternative designations: 1912 NU; A907 UE; 1941 WR; 1968 UT
- Minor planet category: Main belt (Flora family)

Orbital characteristics
- Epoch 31 July 2016 (JD 2457600.5)
- Uncertainty parameter 0
- Observation arc: 103.98 yr (37979 d)
- Aphelion: 2.4509 AU (366.65 Gm)
- Perihelion: 2.0561 AU (307.59 Gm)
- Semi-major axis: 2.2535 AU (337.12 Gm)
- Eccentricity: 0.087584
- Orbital period (sidereal): 3.38 yr (1235.6 d)
- Average orbital speed: 19.80 km/s
- Mean anomaly: 317.487°
- Mean motion: 0° 17^{m} 28.86^{s} / day
- Inclination: 4.2564°
- Longitude of ascending node: 82.661°
- Argument of perihelion: 55.396°

Physical characteristics
- Synodic rotation period: 5.5783 h (0.23243 d)
- Spectral type: A or Ld
- Absolute magnitude (H): 13.0

728 Leonisis is an asteroid of the Flora family, discovered by Austrian astronomer Johann Palisa on 16 February 1912 from Vienna.

There is some uncertainty as to its spectral class. It has been previously placed in the rare A and Ld classes. These are generally "stony" spectra, but with significant deviations from the usual S-type. The unusual spectrum brings Leonisis' membership in the Flora family into doubt.

Photometric observations of this asteroid from the Organ Mesa Observatory in Las Cruces, New Mexico, during 2010 gave a light curve with a period of 5.5783 ± 0.0002 hours and a brightness variation of 0.20 ± 0.04 magnitude.
