= Meitei astronomy =

Study for celestial and heavenly bodies of the universe in Meitei civilization

Meitei astronomy (Meitei: Khenchonglon/Khenchanglon)
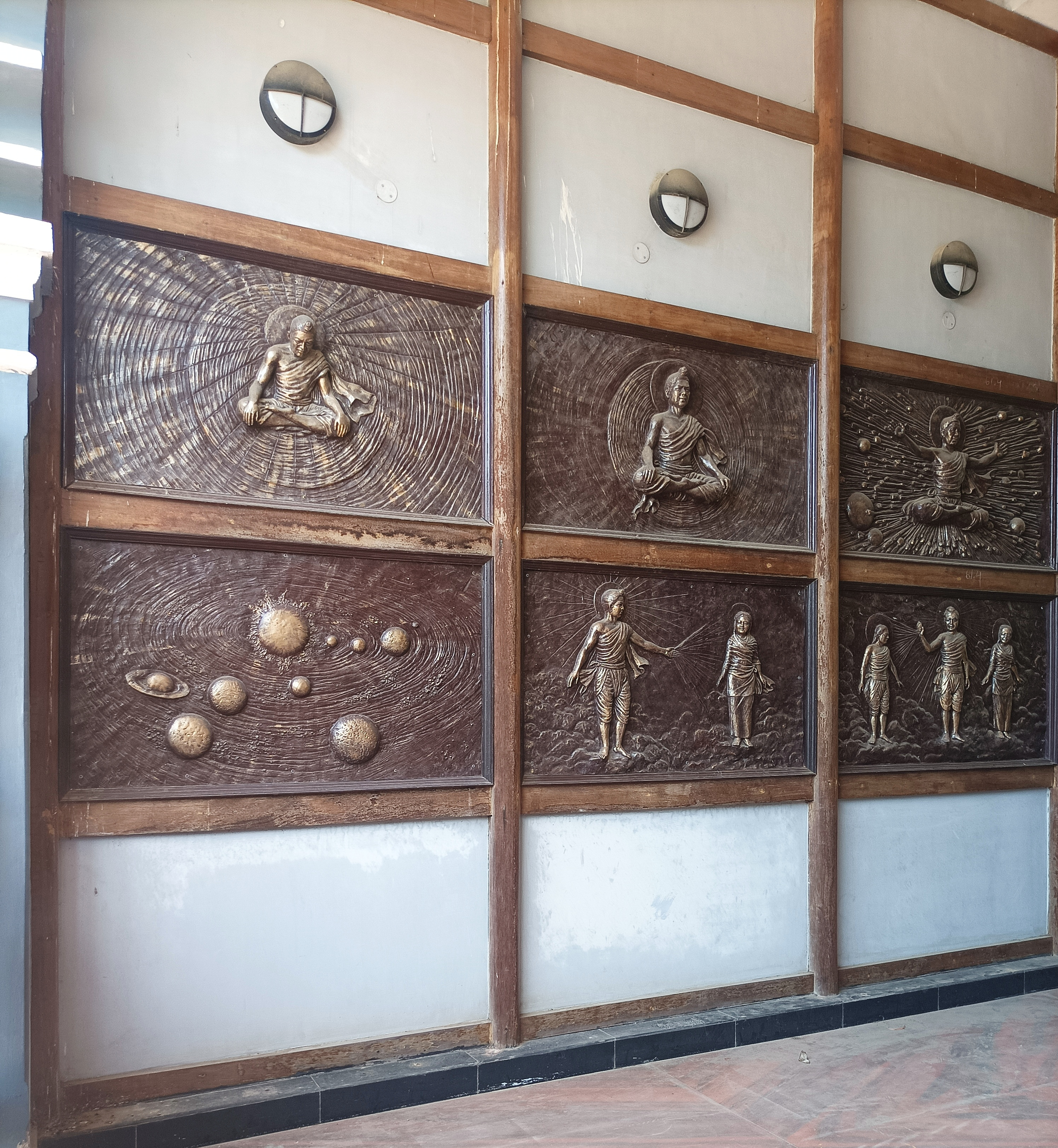
- Classical Meitei relief arts depicting the mythological creation of celestial and heavenly bodies, displayed inside the Kangla Fort in Imphal
- Cultural origins: Meitei culture

The astronomy of Meitei civilisation deals with celestial objects, space, and the physical universe as a whole.

Meitei language term “Khenchanglon” (Meitei: ꯈꯦꯟꯆꯪꯂꯣꯟ / ꯈꯦꯟꯆꯡꯂꯣꯟ) is derived from its ancient Meitei equivalent “Khenchonglon” (Meitei: ꯈꯦꯟꯆꯣꯡꯂꯣꯟ), literally meaning "the growing up, evolving or emergence of natural / celestial body(ies) and energy(ies)" and colloquially meaning "astronomy or astronomical bodies, like stars, constellations, planets, satellites, comets, meteors, etc." The Meitei astronomy was also related to the tradition of astrology.

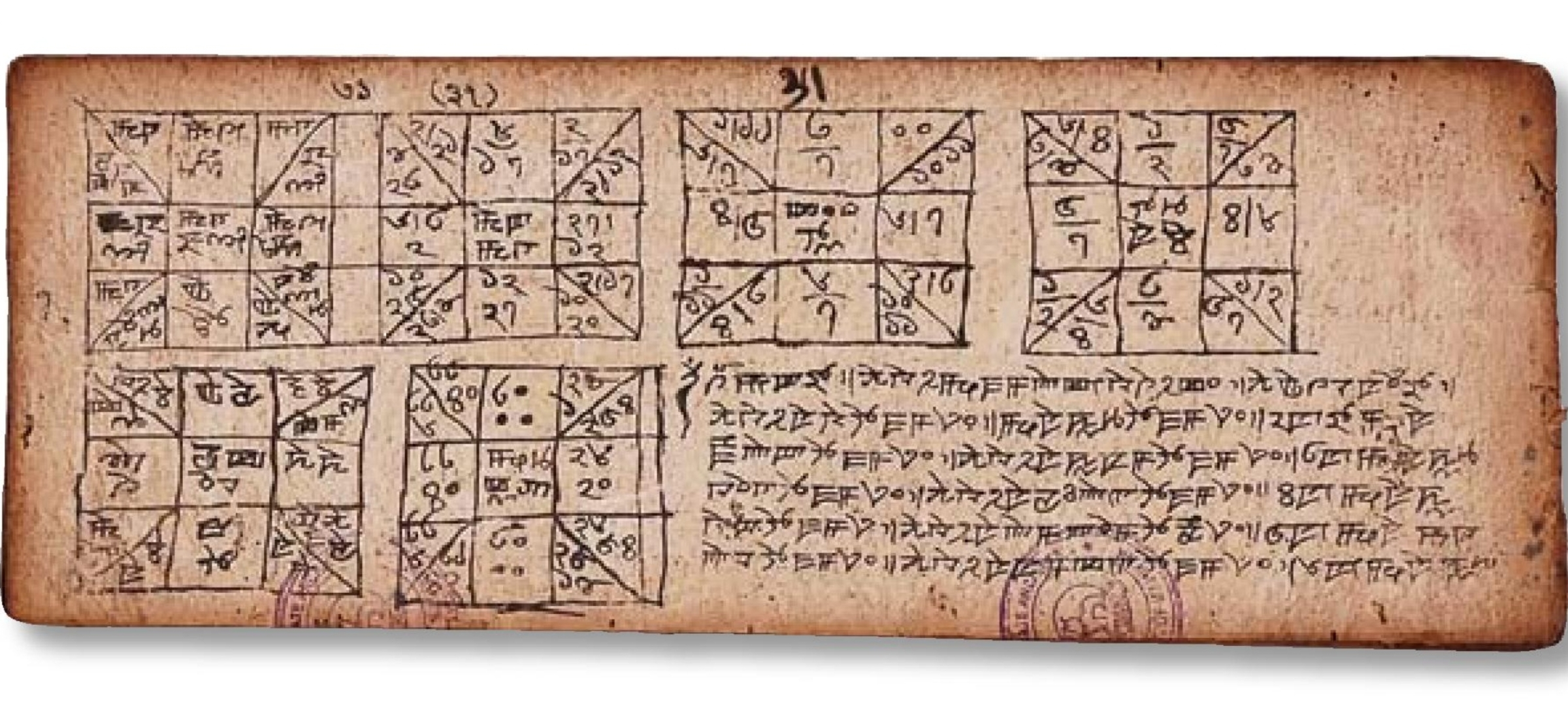
Subika, a Classical Meitei language illustrated manuscript text, in traditional Meetei Mayek writing system, about the Meitei astronomy & cosmology of Kangleipak

== Constellations ==
Constellations	Romanisation	English names	Indo-Aryan/Sanskrit equivalents	Number of stars
ꯁꯖꯤꯛ	Sajik	Arietis	Ashini	Consisting of 3 stars
ꯊꯕꯥ	Thaba	II Arietis or Musca	Barni	Consisting of 3 stars
ꯈꯣꯡꯖꯣꯝꯅꯨꯕꯤ	Khongjomnubi	Tauri or Pleiades	Ktitika	Consisting of 6 stars
ꯑꯄꯛꯉꯥ	Apaknga	4th Lunar Masion Pauri II	Ruhini	Consisting of 5 stars
ꯁꯥꯆꯨꯡ ꯇꯦꯜꯍꯩꯕ	Sachungtelheiba	Orionis	Mrigisera	Consisting of 3 stars
ꯂꯤꯛꯂꯥ ꯁꯥꯐꯕ	Likla Saphaba	Orion	Adra	Consisting of 1 star
ꯆꯤꯡꯆꯥꯂꯣꯢꯄꯤ	Chingroibi	Geminorum	Punbarsu	Consisting of 2/4 stars
ꯆꯨꯡꯁꯦꯟꯅꯨꯕꯤ	Chungsenubi	Cancri	Pursha	Consisting of 3 stars
ꯅꯤꯡꯊꯧ ꯅꯥꯒ	Ningthounaga	Hydae or Hydai	Aslesha	Consisting of 5 stars
ꯅꯤꯡꯊꯧ ꯇꯨꯔꯦꯜ	Ningthouturel	Leonis or Regulus	Magha	Consisting of 5 stars
ꯅꯤꯡꯊꯧ ꯁꯃꯨ	Ningthousamu	Leonis	Parbaphalguni	Consisting of 2 stars
ꯁꯃꯨꯄꯤꯆꯥ	Samupicha	Leonis II	Utarphalguni	Consisting of 2 stars
ꯎꯐꯣꯡ ꯉꯥꯇꯨ	Uphongngatu	Carvi	Hasta	Consisting of 5 stars
ꯃꯣꯀꯥꯡ ꯁꯜꯀ	Mokang	Virginis or Spica	Chitra	Consisting of 1 star
ꯂꯨꯋꯥꯡ ꯁꯜꯀ	Luwang	Bootis or Arcturus	Swati	Consisting of 1 star
	Nanap	Librae or Libra	Bisaka	Consisting of 2 stars
ꯑꯣꯛꯄꯨꯔꯣꯢ	Okpuroi	Scorpii or Scorpionis	Anuradha	Consisting of 4 stars
ꯇꯥꯎꯍꯨꯢꯔꯦꯡ	Taohuireng	Scorpii or Scorpionis Antares	Zestha	Consisting of 3 stars
ꯇꯣꯟꯖꯦꯡꯅꯨꯕꯤ	Tongjengnubi	Scorpii or Scorpionis	Mula	Consisting of 11 stars
ꯊꯥꯌꯥꯢ	Thayai	Sagittarii	Parbasera	Consisting of 2 stars
ꯊꯥꯇꯣꯟ	Thaton	Sagittari	Utrasara	Consisting of 3 stars
ꯃꯅꯤ ꯃꯃꯧ ꯁꯤꯟꯇꯥꯛꯅꯕꯤ	Mani-Mamou	Acquilae or Aquilee	Sarbana	Consisting of 3 stars
ꯍꯥꯔꯩ ꯃꯥꯌꯦ	Hareimaye	Delphini	Dhanistha	Consisting of 4 stars
ꯀꯣꯔꯧꯅꯨ	Korounu	Aquarrii	Satbisa	Consisting of 100 stars
ꯈꯥꯕ ꯂꯩꯅꯤꯡ	Khabaliteng	Pegasi	Purbadrabad	Consisting of 2 stars
ꯁꯤꯜꯄ ꯂꯩꯅꯤꯡ	Silpaleining	Pegasi or Andromedae	Utarbabrabad	Consisting of 2 stars
ꯌꯥꯋꯥ ꯈꯨꯔꯣ	Yawakhuro	Lunar Mansion	Rebati	Consisting of 32 stars

== Planets ==
Planets	Romanisation	English names	Indo-Aryan/Sanskrit equivalents	Literal meanings
ꯅꯣꯡꯃꯥꯏꯆꯤꯡ ꯊꯄꯤ	Nongmaiching	Sun	Rabi	Sunday planet
ꯅꯤꯡꯊꯧꯀꯥꯄ ꯊꯄꯤ	Ningthoukaba	Moon	Chandra	Monday planet
ꯂꯩꯄꯥꯛꯄꯣꯛꯄ ꯊꯄꯤ	Leipakpokpa	Mars	Mangal	Tuesday planet
ꯌꯨꯝꯁꯀꯩꯁ ꯊꯄꯤ	Yumsakeisa	Mercury	Buddha	Wednesday planet
ꯁꯀꯣꯜꯁꯦꯟ ꯊꯄꯤ	Sagolshen	Jupiter	Brihaspati	Thursday planet
ꯏꯂꯥꯢ ꯊꯄꯤ	Irai	Venus	Sukra	Friday planet
ꯊꯥꯡꯆ ꯊꯄꯤ	Thangja	Saturn	Shani	Saturday planet
ꯁꯥꯀꯣꯛ ꯊꯄꯤ	Shakok	Urenus (Herschel)	Rahu	Head of Taoroinai celestial dragon
ꯁꯥꯃꯩ ꯊꯄꯤ	Shamei	Neptune	Ketu	Tail of Taoroinai celestial dragon

== Star tracks ==
Star tracks	Romanisation	English names	Indo-Aryan/Sanskrit equivalents	Ref./Note(s)
ꯍꯥꯃꯦꯡ	Hameng	Aries	Mesh	
ꯇꯥꯟꯕ	Tanba	Taurus	Brisha	
ꯁꯥꯐꯨ	Shaphu	Gemini	Mithun	
ꯋꯥꯏꯈꯨ	Waikhu	Cancer	Karkat	
ꯅꯣꯡꯁꯥ	Nongsha	Leo	Singha	
ꯅꯨꯔꯥ	Nura	Virgo	Keina	
ꯄꯥꯕꯣꯠ ꯆꯪ	Pabot Chang	Libra	Tula	
ꯇꯤꯂꯥꯏꯈꯣꯝꯕꯤ	Tilaikhombi	Scorpion	Brisik	
ꯂꯤꯔꯤ ꯇꯦꯟ	Liri Ten	Sagittarius	Dhanu	
ꯆꯤꯡꯂꯥꯏ	Chinglai	Capricorn	Makar	
ꯏꯁꯤꯡ ꯄꯨꯟ	Ishing Pun	Aquarius	Kumbha	
ꯉꯥ ꯄꯔꯦꯡ	Nga Pareng	Pisces	Mina	

== See also ==
- Khongjomnubi Nonggarol
- Meitei calendar
- Chinese astronomy
- Islamic astronomy
- Greek astronomy
