= Nongkhong Koiba =

Meitei mythological circumambulation of the universe

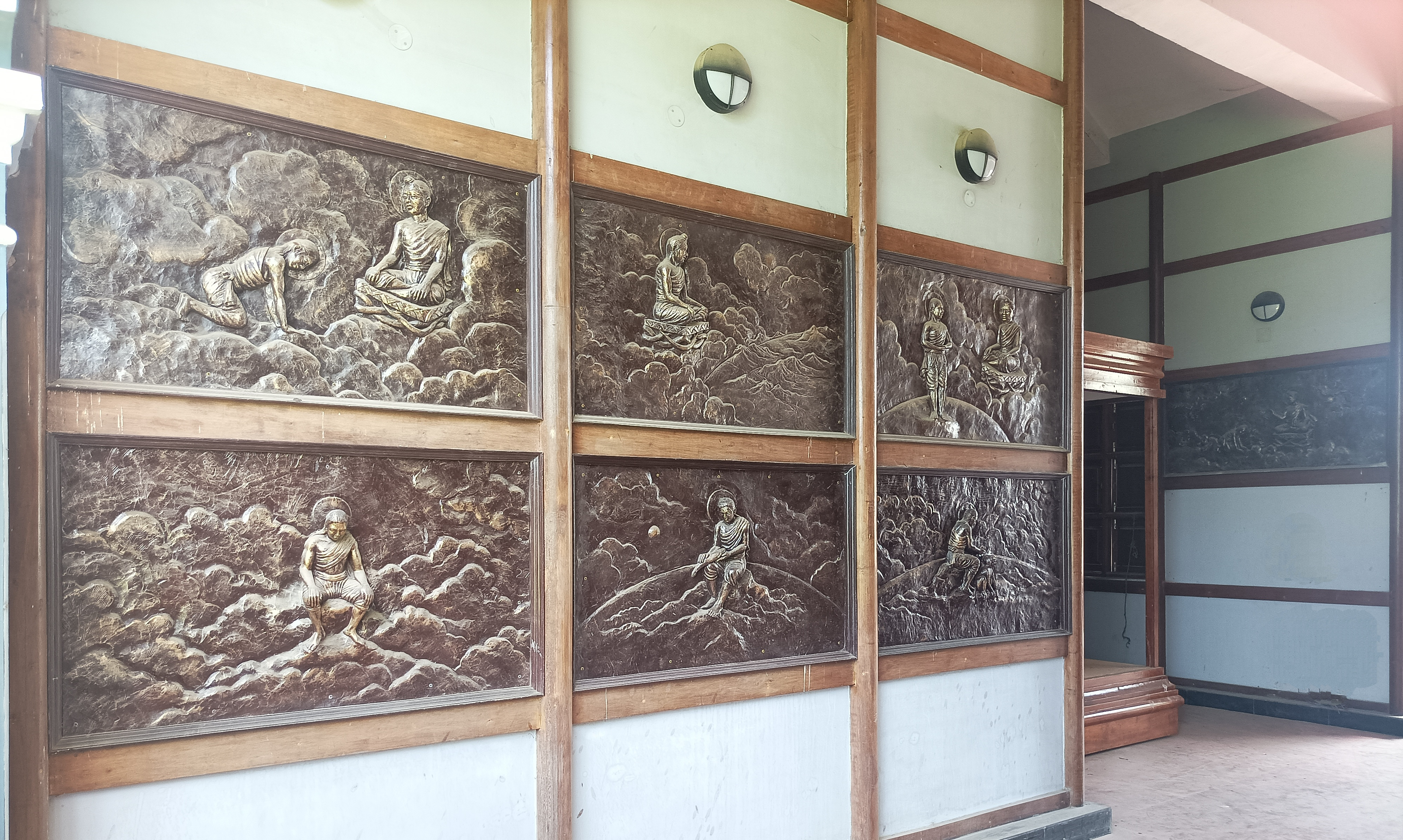
Classical Meitei relief arts depicting the mythological events of Nongkhong Koiba in the Kangla Fort in Imphal

Nongkhong Koiba (ꯅꯣꯡꯈꯣꯡ ꯀꯣꯏꯕ), also spelled Nangkhang Koiba (ꯅꯪꯈꯪ ꯀꯣꯏꯕ), is a cultural and cosmological tradition of the Meitei people of Ancient Kangleipak (present-day Manipur). It forms part of the Meitei indigenous belief system and scriptural heritage recorded in Meetei Puyas (ancient texts), particularly the Wakoklon Heelel Thilel Salai Amailon Pukok Puya. The tradition centers around a symbolic act involving the circumambulation of a sacred site or cosmological principle called Nongkhong, signifying a divine or cosmic origin of kingship, life, and governance.

The Meitei mythology of Nongkhong Koiba is related to the development of the Meitei festival of Yaoshang (ꯌꯥꯎꯁꯪ).

== Etymology and meaning ==
In ancient Meitei language, Nongkhong (ꯅꯣꯡꯈꯣꯡ) refers to the cosmic "footprint" or the point on Earth where the cosmic creator deity (Salailel Sitapa or Ipa Sorarel) first set foot to implant life on Earth.

Meitei language term "Koiba" (ꯀꯣꯏꯕ) means "to go around" or "circumambulate".

Together, Nongkhong Koiba symbolizes the act of going around the sacred point of cosmic origin as an acknowledgment of divine authority and cosmological understanding.

== Scriptural basis ==
The tradition is rooted in passages from the Wakoklon Heelel Thilel Salai Amailon Pukok, an ancient Meetei scripture. Two relevant excerpts highlight the origin and philosophical basis of the practice. The first excerpt discusses the birth of divine beings and their connection to the cosmic seat of power (Fampan Fangkhong). The second describes a cosmological event where life is believed to have originated on Earth from an extra-terrestrial source.

Excerpts (translated and summarized):

1. “Pakhangba was born of a mother after a ten-month gestation. Sanamahi, his elder sibling, was not born through a maternal womb. The seat of authority (Fampan Fangkhong) was associated with the cosmic progenitor Salailel Sitapa.”

2. “The creator set foot upon the Earth at the Nongkhong point, planting life. The Nongkhong is the place where the cosmic father made contact with the Earth for the first time.”

These excerpts establish the metaphysical and cosmological framework for the Nongkhong Koiba ritual.

== Narrative ==
According to the tradition, the cosmic deity Salailel Sitapa (also called Ipa Sorarel or “universal father”), after reaching old age, decided to pass on his divine seat of authority (Fampan). He proposed a test to his two sons—Sanamahi and Konchin Tukthapa Pali Atonpa.

Sanamahi (ꯁꯅꯥꯃꯍꯤ), a powerful, divine being, took the challenge literally and began a journey around the universe.

Konchin Tukthapa (ꯀꯣꯟꯆꯤꯟ ꯇꯨꯛꯊꯄ), the younger son and a fully human being, acknowledged his limitations and sought guidance from his mother, Ima Leimalel Sitapi (personification of Earth). She advised him to circumambulate his father sitting on the Fampan Fangkhong seven times, touching his forehead to the Earth in reverence.

Konchin Tukthapa followed this advice and completed the act before Sanamahi returned. Pleased by this gesture of understanding and humility, Salailel Sitapa awarded Konchin Tukthapa the seat of kingship and gave him the title Pakhangba.

== Philosophical and cosmological significance ==
The Nongkhong Koiba is not presented as a test of intelligence or speed, but as a cosmic and philosophical ritual demonstrating knowledge of one's divine origin and responsibility. It reflects Meetei cosmology’s belief in:

- Extra-terrestrial origin of life: Life originates from the universe and is planted on Earth.
- Unity between space and earth: The interaction between Salailel Sitapa (space) and Leimalel Sitapi (earth) produces and sustains life.
- Numerology: The number seven (talet) holds significance—representing seven parts of the cosmic god (Lainingthou Talet), seven clans of the Meetei people (Salai), and seven original stars (Thouwai Michak).

== Comparison with the Ganesha–Kartikeya tradition ==
The Nongkhong Koiba tradition has often been compared to the Hindu legend involving Ganesha and Kartikeya, particularly a story in which both brothers are told to race around the world for a prize (usually a fruit or marriage privilege). Ganesha circumambulates his parents instead, claiming that they represent the world.

The tradition is often discussed in relation to and in contrast with the Hindu legend involving Ganesha and Kartikeya, wherein both sons of Shiva and Parvati participate in a similar symbolic contest involving going around the world. However, adherents of the Meetei tradition argue that the Nongkhong Koiba tradition is distinct in origin, philosophy, cosmology, and purpose.

The Nongkhong Koiba tradition represents a distinct theological and cosmological narrative deeply rooted in Meitei philosophy and culture. Its emphasis on cosmic origin, symbolic ritual, and moral duty underscores the Meetei worldview of human life as an extension of divine intention. The comparison with the Ganesha–Kartikeya story reveals conceptual differences rather than parallels, with the Meetei tradition offering a structured and philosophically integrated account of spiritual kingship and cosmic connection.

Proponents of Meetei tradition assert key differences:

1. Ontology of Characters

Aspect	Nongkhong Koiba (Meetei)	Ganesha–Kartikeya (Hindu)
Father	Salailel Sitapa (cosmic creator)	Shiva (earthly deity)
Mother	Leimalel Sitapi (Earth personified)	Parvati
Elder Son	Sanamahi (divine being)	Kartikeya
Younger Son	Konchin Tukthapa (human)	Ganesha

2. Philosophical Structure

Feature	Nongkhong Koiba	Ganesha–Kartikeya
Core Concept	Connection to cosmic origin, humility, understanding	Filial devotion, wit
Outcome	Legitimation of divine kingship	Winning a reward (fruit or bride)
Ritual Precision	Seven circumambulations, clearly defined	Variable (one, three, seven, or undefined)

3. Symbolic Geography

In Nongkhong Koiba, the circumambulation is around Fampan Fangkhong, symbolizing the seat of the universal father. In Hindu traditions, Ganesha circumambulates either both parents, only Parvati, or makes symbolic gestures depending on narrative variation.

== Cultural significance ==
The tradition holds particular importance in establishing the divine right and sacred origins of Meetei kingship. Pakhangba, the title given to Konchin Tukthapa, became emblematic of rulership that understands and honors both cosmic law and earthly life.

The Nongkhong Koiba tradition also underpins broader Meetei philosophical frameworks such as:

- Leitai Nongtai Chakoi: The cosmic dance of space and earth.
- Fampan Fangkhong: The metaphysical throne from which creation and authority emanate.

== Criticism of Hindu comparison ==
Proponents of Nongkhong Koiba argue that the Ganesha–Kartikeya tradition lacks:

- A consistent ritual structure (number of circumambulations varies).
- Fixed symbolic references (whom to circumambulate and why).
- Philosophical depth regarding the origin of life and cosmic order.
- They also note the lack of direct scriptural citations for the Ganesha–Kartikeya story in canonical Hindu texts such as the Vedas or Puranas, suggesting the tale is more folkloric or allegorical than foundational.

== See also ==
- Meitei royal etiquette
- Sanamahi Ahong Khong Chingba
- Lai Haraoba
- Ancient Meitei hymns
- Meitei ritual songs
- Ougri
- Meitei martial arts
- Meitei traditional weapons
- Meitei traditional toys
- Meitei traditional games
