= Maliyapham Palcha =

- Inventor of the Meitei calendar

1359 BC
- Monarchy: 1359 BC-1329 BC
- Coronation: 1359 BC
- Predecessor: Ningthou Kangba
- Successor: Ningthou Kaksuba
- Born: Koi Koi
Names
- Mari Ya Fambal Cha
Era name and dates
- Ancient Manipur: 1359 BC-1329 BC
- Father: Ningthou Kangba
- Mother: Leima Taritnu
- Religion: Meeteism of Sanamahism
- Occupation: Emperor of Ancient Manipur

Maliyapham Palcha (1359 BC-1329 BC), also known as Mari Ya Phambal Cha or Koi Koi, is a king of Ancient Manipur (Antique Kangleipak) kingdom. He is the successor and one of the nine sons of King Ningthou Kangba (1405 BC-1359 BC) as evident in the Ningthou Kangbalon.

He ascended the throne at the age of twenty five and introduced a calendar system called the Mari-Fam or Maliyapham (later known as the Meetei calendar).

He was succeeded by Ningthou Kaksuba.

== Other website ==
- Traditional Customs and Rituals of Northeast India: Arunachal Pradesh, meghalaya, Manipur, Assam
