= Meitei diaspora =

Meiteis living outside their homeland

Meitei diaspora (Manipuri diaspora)
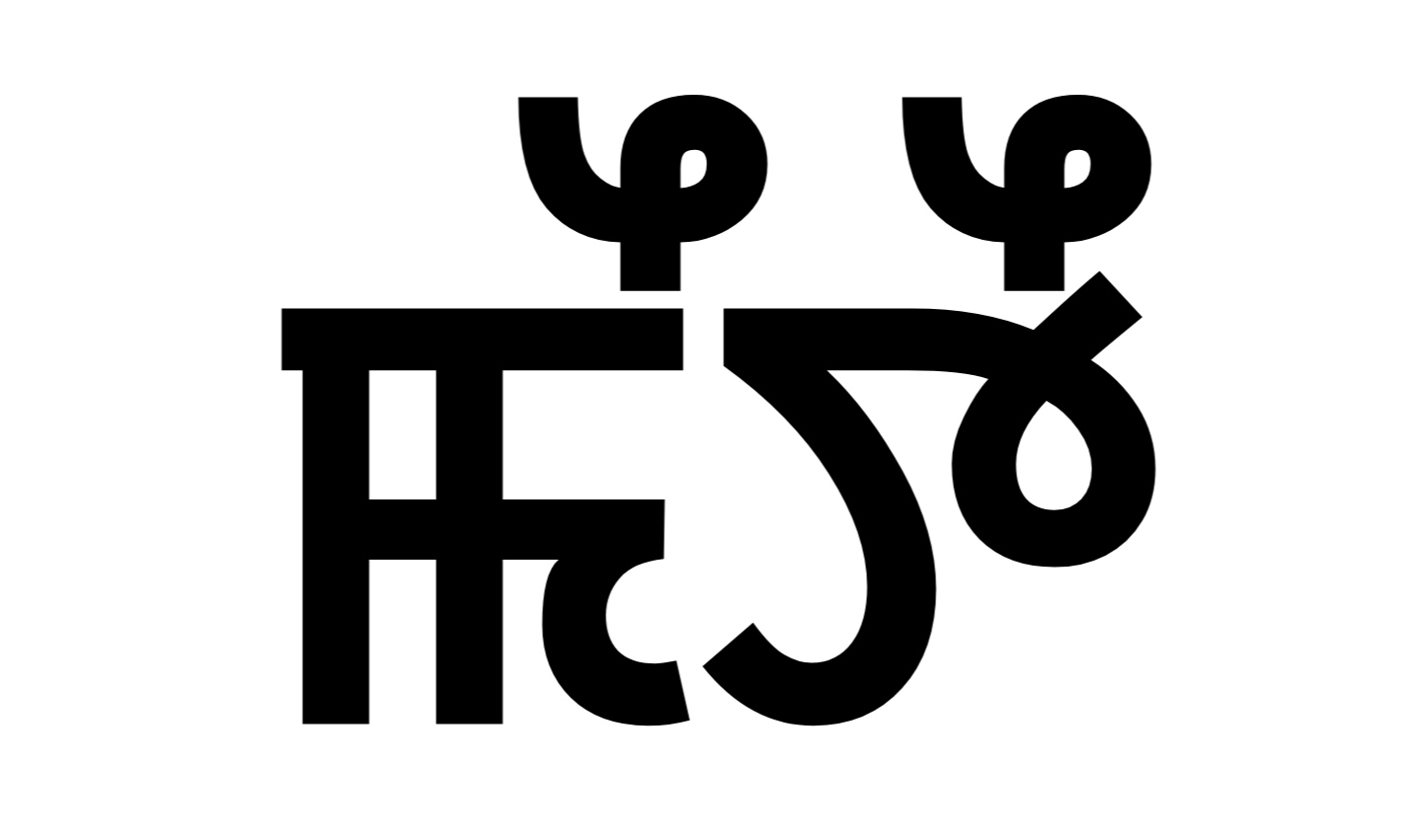

- Meitei cultural flag

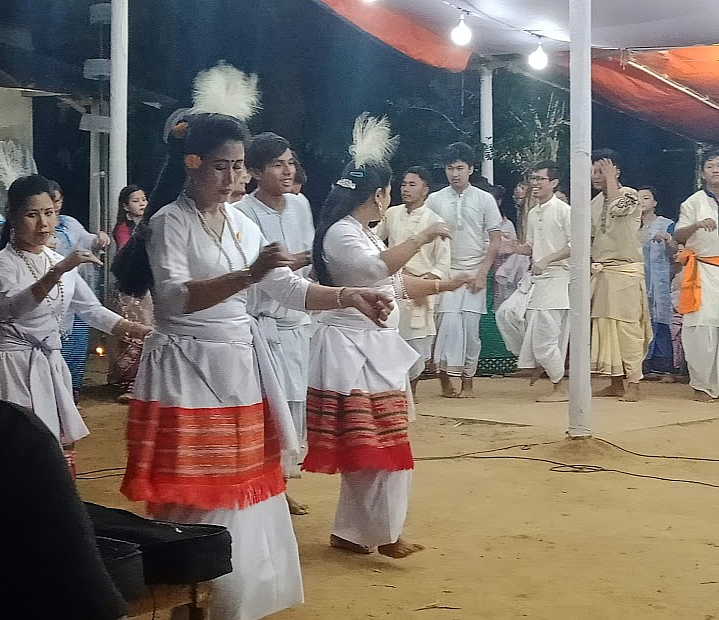
- Maibis (traditional Meitei priestesses) dancing to please the Umang Lai deities of Sanamahism during Lai Haraoba festival in Bangladesh
- (Meitei ethnicity) Meitei ethnicity (including those of ancestral descent)

Regions with significant populations
- Myanmar, Bangladesh, the United Kingdom, the United States, Australia, Canada, Korea and the Gulf states

Languages
- Meitei language (officially known as Manipuri language)

Religion
- Hinduism & Sanamahism

Related ethnic groups
- other Indian diaspora, Bangladeshi diaspora and Burmese diaspora

The Meitei diaspora, also known as the Manipuri diaspora, comprises individuals of Meitei ethnicity (or Manipuri people), who have migrated from their ancestral homeland of Manipur, a state in northeastern India, to various regions across the world. Historically, movements of Meitei populations have occurred due to political, economic, and educational factors, as well as regional instability, most significantly during the Seven Years' Devastation of Manipur Kingdom. Notable Meitei communities exist in neighboring countries such as Myanmar and Bangladesh, as well as in more distant locations including the United Kingdom, the United States, Australia, Canada, Korea and the Gulf states. (Note: Especially in the United Arab Emirates.) The diaspora maintains varying degrees of cultural, linguistic, and social ties to Manipur, while also adapting to the contexts of their host societies.

== Geographical distribution ==
The Meitei diaspora is geographically distributed in several countries. In Australia, they are primarily concentrated in the cities of Sydney and Melbourne. In Bangladesh, a significant number reside in the Sylhet division. In Canada, notable communities are established in Montreal of Quebec, and Toronto of Ontario. In Myanmar, Meitei populations are found mainly in the eastern states of Kachin and Shan, as well as in the Yangon, Sagaing, and Ayeyarwaddy administrative divisions. South Korea hosts a visible Meitei presence in the city of Anseong, near Seoul. In the United Kingdom, Meitei individuals are present in regions including Kent, Worcester, Nottingham, Hertfordshire, and Sheffield. In the United States, the diaspora was initially more widely dispersed, with smaller populations in states such as New Jersey, Illinois, Texas, Pennsylvania (notably in Philadelphia), North Carolina, Washington, D.C., and California, but later settled in Virginia, Maryland, North Carolina, Texas, New Jersey, Massachusetts, Connecticut, Ohio, Indiana, Illinois, Michigan, Missouri, Tennessee, Alabama, and Florida.

== Culture ==
=== Dance and music ===
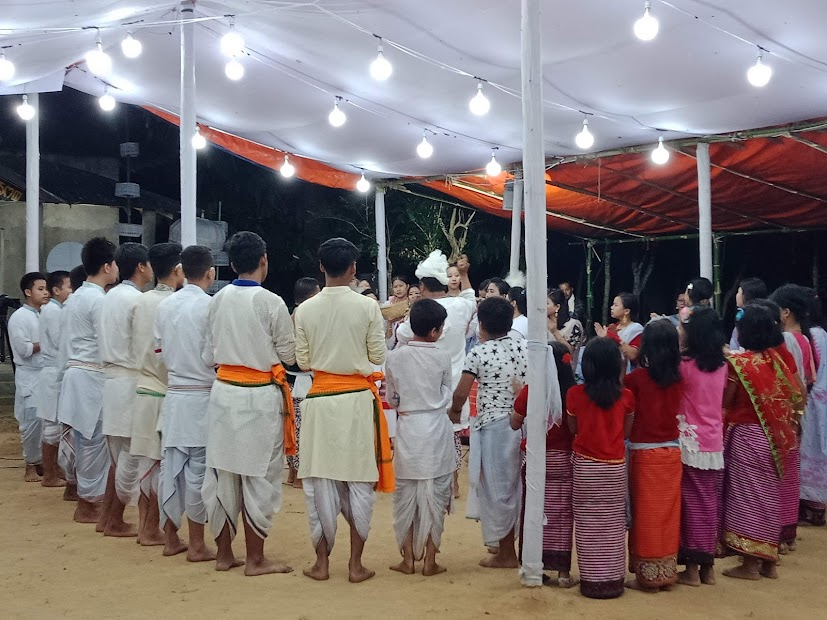
Meitei people of all age groups participating in Lai Haraoba dance and music festival, for the Umang Lai deities of Sanamahism in Bangladesh

Khamba Thoibi Jagoi dance (ꯈꯝꯕ ꯊꯣꯏꯕꯤ ꯖꯒꯣꯏ), also known as Thoibi Jagoi (ꯊꯣꯏꯕꯤ ꯖꯒꯣꯏ), is performed in Bangladesh, the United Kingdom, among others.

Leima Jagoi (ꯂꯩꯃ ꯖꯒꯣꯏ) is performed by the Meitei diaspora community in Canada, the United States, among others.

Maibi Jagoi dance (ꯃꯥꯏꯕꯤ ꯖꯒꯣꯏ) is performed in Australia, Bangladesh, among others.

Pung Cholom dance (ꯄꯨꯡ ꯆꯣꯂꯣꯝ ꯖꯒꯣꯏ) is performed by the Meitei diaspora community in Canada, among others.

Thabal Chongba dance (ꯊꯥꯕꯜ ꯆꯣꯡꯕ ꯖꯒꯣꯏ), also known as Thabal dance (ꯊꯥꯕꯜ ꯖꯒꯣꯏ), is performed by the Meitei diaspora community in Bangladesh, Canada, Korea, the United States, among others.

=== Festivals ===
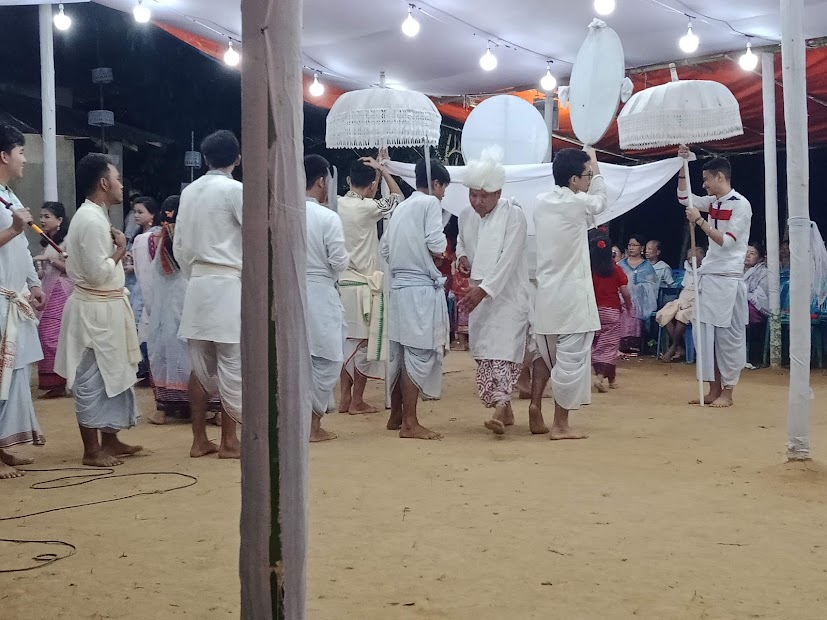
Holding holy & sacred parasols by the devotees of Umang Lai deities of Sanamahism during Lai Haraoba in Bangladesh

Cheiraoba (ꯆꯩꯔꯥꯎꯕ), or Sajibu Cheiraoba (ꯁꯖꯤꯕꯨ ꯆꯩꯔꯥꯎꯕ), is celebrated by the Meitei diaspora community in Australia, Korea, the United States, among others.

Lai Haraoba in Bangladesh and Lai Haraoba in Myanmar are notable celebrations of Lai Haraoba (ꯂꯥꯏ ꯍꯔꯥꯎꯕ) outside India. In Bangladesh, it was celebrated with the help of the UNESCO and the Government of Bangladesh in 2025.

Ningol Chakouba (ꯅꯤꯉꯣꯜ ꯆꯥꯀꯧꯕ) or Ningol Chakkouba (ꯅꯤꯉꯣꯜ ꯆꯥꯛꯀꯧꯕ) is celebrated by Meitei diaspora community in Australia, Bangladesh, Canada, Korea, the United Kingdom, the United States, among others.

Yaoshang or Yaosang (ꯌꯥꯎꯁꯪ) is celebrated by the Meitei diaspora community in the United States, among others.

== Language ==
Meitei language (also known as Manipuri language) is the common linguistic identity of all the diaspora members belonging to the Meitei ethnicity (or the Manipuri people) living across the globe.

In Bangladesh, the Meitei language may disappear in the next generation because many Meitei people are now speaking Bengali more fluently than their own language.

In Myanmar, most Meiteis still speak their native language. However, some younger Meiteis have stopped speaking it after converting to Buddhism, as Burmese language is more socially accepted in the Buddhist society in their country.

Second-generation and third-generation Meitei people in the United States may have limited proficiency in Meiteilon (Manipuri language) and are typically more comfortable with English.

== Associations and organizations ==
- Association of Meiteis in the Americas (AMA)
- Bangladesh Manipuri Sahitya Sangsad
- European Manipuri Association (EMA)
- Korea Manipuri Association (KMA)
- Manipuri Association of Canada (MAC)
- Meithei/Kathe Ethnic Literature and Culture Association
- North American Bangladesh Manipuri Society
- North American Manipuri Association (NAMA)
- United Meitei Language and Cultural Group

== See also ==
- Burmese–Meitei relations
  - Chahi Taret Khuntakpa
  - Meitei–Shan relations
- Ahom–Meitei relations
- Meitei monuments in Bangladesh
- Meitei people in Assam
- Meitei people in Maharashtra
- Meitei people in Meghalaya
- Meitei people in Tripura

== Bibliography ==
- Manipuri Diaspora Identity And Culture In India And Various Countries
