= North American Manipur Association =

The North American Manipur Association (NAMA), also known as the North American Manipuri Association (ꯅꯣꯔ꯭ꯊ ꯑꯃꯦꯔꯤꯀꯥꯟ ꯃꯅꯤꯄꯨꯔ ꯑꯦꯁꯣꯁꯤꯌꯦꯁꯟ), is a non-profit organization formed by people from the Indian state of Manipur who live in North America. It aims to promote and preserve the social, cultural, and educational heritage of Meitei people (Manipuris) living in the United States and Canada.

== Overview ==
NAMA was founded on July 4, 1992, in Brooklyn, New York. The founder was Jupiter Yambem, who died in the World Trade Center attacks. The association’s purpose is to bring together the Meitei diaspora (Manipuri diaspora), support community welfare, and promote Meitei traditions abroad. Its activities include cultural celebrations, conventions, and educational programs.

The organization is based in Maryland, United States.

== History and conventions ==
=== Annual conventions ===
NAMA holds an annual convention at different locations across North America. The conventions are social and cultural events where Manipuri families gather to reconnect, celebrate, and share their traditions. Participants dress in traditional attire, perform dances, sing songs, and enjoy Manipuri food.

Each convention includes presentations, cultural performances, academic awards, and election of executive members. Members from across the U.S. and Canada attend.

==== 24th Annual Convention (2015) ====
The 24th NAMA Annual Convention took place in Washington, D.C., on July 3–4, 2015. It was the largest gathering in NAMA’s history, with nearly 130 participants from several U.S. states.

The event included a social gathering, music, and cultural programs. Traditional Manipuri performances such as Thoibi Jagoi, Mangala Charran, and Thabal Chongba were held. The convention also introduced the NAMA Excellence Awards, which honor Manipuri students in North America for achievements in academics, sports, and arts. The 2015 awardees included Adam Laishram, Prativa Amom, and Bosco Chanam.

A new executive team was elected during the event, and the amended NAMA Constitution was officially approved.

==== 25th Annual Convention (2016) ====
The 25th Annual Convention was held in Charlotte, North Carolina, on July 2–3, 2016, marking NAMA’s Silver Jubilee. Around 100 members attended. The event celebrated 25 years of the association’s existence.

Cultural programs, music, and traditional dances were organized. The convention also honored long-time members and discussed the growth of the Manipuri community abroad. Children and youth took part in performances to learn about their heritage.

The NAMA Academic Excellence Awards (2016) were given to Seine Yumnam, Arina Tayenjam, and Levin C. Patel. Elections for the Advisory and Election Committees were held, and a photography contest was conducted.

An after-party was hosted by members in Gastonia, North Carolina, following the main event. The next annual convention was scheduled to take place in Houston, Texas.

==== 28th Annual Convention (2019) ====
The 28th Annual Convention was held in Chicago, Illinois, on July 5–6, 2019. Attendees came from various parts of North America. The event highlighted NAMA’s ongoing mission to unite Manipuris of different ethnic groups.

== Cultural activities ==
=== Cheiraoba celebration (2012) ===
In April 2012, the Midwest Manipuri community celebrated Cheiraoba, the Manipuri New Year, organized by NAMA. The event took place in Midland, Michigan, and was led by Sapam Shyamananda, NAMA General Secretary.

Members from several Midwestern cities attended, including Chicago, Detroit, and Columbus. Participants wore traditional clothing such as the Phanek for women and Khudei for men. The celebration included prayers, food offerings, and exchange of gifts between family members. Traditional dishes such as rice, fermented bamboo shoots, and fish were served.

The event also introduced a new NAMA logo and website featuring Manipuri-style lettering. The program concluded with traditional music and a short film screening.

== Research and educational programs ==
=== NAMA Research Grant (2025) ===
In 2025, NAMA announced the NAMA Research Grant, a one-time research award to encourage academic excellence among scholars in Manipur.

- Grant amount: INR 50,000
- Eligibility: PhD candidates at universities in Manipur who have completed coursework and demonstrate strong research commitment.
- Number of awards: Two

The program supports innovative research and aims to strengthen a culture of scholarship within the Manipuri community.

== Leadership and structure ==
NAMA’s executive team includes a President, Vice President, General Secretary, Treasurer, and other committee members. The team is elected during the annual convention. Advisory and election committees also help in managing organizational activities and policy decisions.

== Financial aid to public ==
In mid-June 2020, the NAMA donated ₹187,150 (equivalent to ₹240,000 or US$2,500 in 2026) to the Chief Minister's COVID-19 Relief Fund and to two orphanages in Manipur.

In August 2023, the NAMA raised ₹600,000 (equivalent to ₹650,000 or US$6,800 in 2026) through a fundraising campaign for relief efforts in Manipur. The funds were donated to the Manipur Governor’s relief fund to support displaced individuals in relief camps across the state. NAMA requested that the funds be used, either in whole or in part, to provide medical and sanitary assistance to women and children in the camps.
