= Mutua Bahadur =

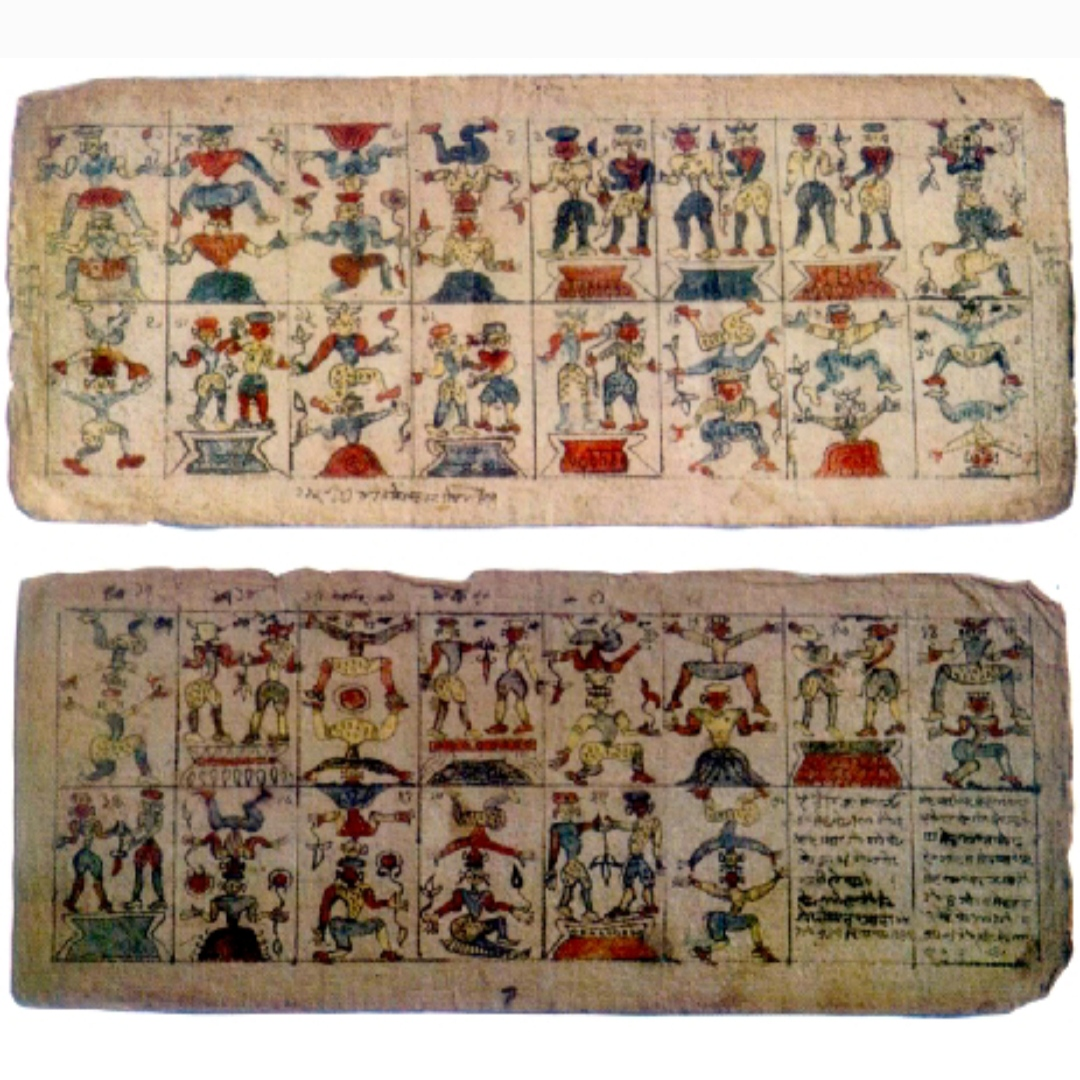
A classical Meitei art collection of Mutua Bahadur

Mutua Bahadur (ꯃꯨꯇꯨꯑꯥ ꯕꯍꯥꯗꯨꯔ) is a cultural activist, curator, researcher, social worker, numismatist, anthropologist, and author from Manipur, India. He is known for his efforts in preserving the tribal and cultural heritage of Manipur and Northeast India. He is the founder of the Mutua Museum (in Imphal) and the Andro Cultural Complex (in Andro).

He has a collection of 6,000 specimens of artefacts, 4,000 gold, silver and bell-metal coins. Some sources say that it is the largest private collection of coins in the Northeast India. He is also the first person to collect copies of old Manipuri stone writings. He also preserved artefacts from Myanmar, China and Bangladesh, which he had collected the items during his visits to these countries.

== Early life ==
Mutua Bahadur was born on 20 January 1948 in Keishampat Mutum Leirak, Imphal. He came from a modest background and started his journey with limited resources. To support his passion for collecting artifacts and ancient materials, he worked as a manual labourer. He painted roads, worked as a porter, and did various jobs to fund his trips to tribal villages. He would pay the owners to acquire traditional and historical items.

His father, M. Ningthou, served as a Burmese soldier and a jeweller. Bahadur inherited his father's spirit of travel and adventure. However, what deeply motivated him was the desire to preserve the past. Growing up after India's independence, Bahadur witnessed a loss of cultural identity among the ethnic communities of Manipur, including the Meiteis. The growing influence of western culture made him concerned about preserving original traditions.

== Foundation of the Museum ==
Bahadur was trained as a fine artist. At the age of 20, he began working on his dream of setting up a museum. In 1979, he opened the Mutua Museum at Keishampat. Later, in 1993, the exhibits were moved to a newly established Andro Cultural Complex in Andro village, about 26 kilometers from Imphal. The museum building at Keishampat is now used as his office.

== Andro Cultural Complex ==
The Andro Cultural Complex covers an area of 0.93 acre. It preserves and displays the cultural heritage of Northeast India. Exhibits include basketry, pottery, musical instruments, ornaments, sculptures, paintings, dolls, and textiles. The complex also houses around 100 local orchid species.

One notable exhibit is a collection of several dolls, representing the 29 recognized tribes of Manipur in traditional dress. Traditional houses of various communities, including the Meitei community, have also been built using traditional methods and rituals. Bahadur explained that these houses symbolize unity among the tribes and are preserved using smoke.

He has plans to develop the complex into a model village representing cultures of Southeast Asian countries.

== Living museum in Purul village ==
In October 1990, Bahadur created a living museum in Purul village, Senapati district. This museum preserves the traditional houses of the headmen of Purul Atongba and Purul Akupta. The headmen, K. Hekhani and S. Koni, receive monthly support to maintain these homes in their original form. The families live in the houses and continue with their traditional way of life. A formal agreement was signed to preserve the structures and their cultural significance.

== Research and publications ==
Bahadur has also published many books about tribal art and culture. His works include books on manuscript paintings, tribal art, jewellery, cane and bamboo crafts, textiles, and handwoven fabrics. Some of his books have been translated into Japanese language.

Although he did not complete his graduation, he is a visiting lecturer at Manipur University and also gives lectures to IAS probationers on tribal art and culture.

== Awards and recognition ==
Mutua Bahadur has received several awards for his contributions. He received the Special Designer Award in 1972 and the State Kala Academy Award in Folk Arts in 1974. The Manipur state government has recommended him for a UNESCO prize, which is yet to be awarded. The Mutua Museum celebrated its silver jubilee in 2004.

== Lecture on Manipuri diaspora in Myanmar ==
On 13 January 2025, Bahadur delivered a lecture at D.M. College of Arts, Imphal, during a programme organized by the History Club on the theme "History for Tomorrow." He spoke about the cultural decline among communities in Manipur and gave a lecture titled "Manipuri Diaspora in Myanmar."

Bahadur explained the history of Manipuri settlement in Myanmar, especially during the Seven Years' Devastation (1819–1826). He noted that ties between the kingdoms existed earlier through matrimonial alliances. He described how many Manipuris were taken to Burma during military campaigns led by Alaungpaya, especially during the time of Maharaj Bhagyachandra.

Manipuris in Myanmar became known for their military skills. The Kathe cavalry force was formed by Burmese rulers with Manipuri soldiers. Manipuri Brahmins (Paona) also served as court astrologers.

Bahadur observed that many Manipuris in Myanmar have now lost their cultural identity and adopted Burmese traditions. He said most cannot speak their original language. Some still observe Lai Haraoba, although in a Burmanised way. He also visited Manipuri Muslim families in Mandalay, who had fully adopted Burmese culture.

His lecture included photographs and videos to support his findings.

== Published works ==
=== Books ===
Mutua Bahadur wrote many books, including 20 books of illustration works. Some of the titles of the books include:

1. Manipuri Arts ki Wari (1972) 2. Traditional Textiles of Manipur (1987) 3. The Khamba-Thoibi of Moirang in Manipuri paintings: Bhadra collection (1988) 4. Jewelleries of Manipur (1988) 5. Tribal Art of Manipur (1989) 6. Cane & Bamboo Crafts of Manipur (1994) 7. Traditional Textiles of Manipur (1997) 8. Tribal Hand-woven fabrics of Manipur (2000) 9. Traditional Paintings of Manipur (2003) 10. Illustrated Manuscripts of Manipur (2005) 11. Art of Textile: Manipuri textiles from Bangladesh & Myanmar (2009) 12. Manipuri Costumes Through Ages (India, Bangladesh and Myanmar) (2011) 13. Manipuri Costumes through Ages (2011) 14. Awa: Kate and Paona (2014) 15. Kathe: Myanmarese Meetei (2017) 16. Manipuri Art Language of Symbols (2021), etc.

In a span of five years, he published a five-volume treatise book series, Tales About the Art and Culture of Manipur.

=== Articles ===
Mutua Bahadur wrote articles on different topics, based on his research in Manipur, Myanmar and Bangladesh, including:

1. Illustrated Manuscripts of Manipur 2. Cultural Heritage Complex at Andro Village 3. Manipur Textiles from Bangladesh 4. Manipur in Myanmar 5. Cane and Bamboo Crafts of Manipur 6. Tribal Hand Woven Fabrics of Manipur 7. Manipuri Diaspora in Myanmar: Past and Present 8. Symbolism in the Tribal Art of Manipur, etc.

== See also ==
- Meitei diaspora
