= Valakh =

Village in Maharashtra

- Village
- Country: India
- State: Maharashtra
- District: Pune
- Tehsil: Mawal

Government
  - Type: Panchayati Raj
  - Body: Gram panchayat

Area
  - Total: 177.20 ha (437.9 acres)

Population (2011)
  - Total: 462
  - Density: 261/km^{2} (675/sq mi)
- Sex ratio 226 / 236 ♂/♀

Languages
  - Official: Marathi
  - Other spoken: Hindi
- Time zone: UTC+5:30 (IST)
- Telephone code: 02114
- ISO 3166 code: IN-MH
- Vehicle registration: MH-14
- Website: pune.nic.in

Valakh is a village in Mawal taluka of Pune district in the state of Maharashtra, India. It encompasses an area of 177.20 ha (438 acres).

== Administration ==
The village is administrated by a sarpanch, an elected representative who leads a gram panchayat. At the time of the 2011 Census of India, the gram panchayat governed four villages and was based at Mundhavare.

== Demographics ==
At the 2011 census, the village comprised 80 households. The population of 462 was split between 226 males and 236 females.

== See also ==
- List of villages in Mawal taluka
