= Mundhavare =

Village in Maharashtra

- Village
- Location in Maharashtra, India Mundhavare (India)
- Coordinates: 18.5327163°N 73.9159052°E
- Country: India
- State: Maharashtra
- District: Pune
- Tehsil: Mawal

Government
  - Type: Panchayati Raj
  - Body: Gram panchayat

Area
  - Total: 333.30 ha (823.6 acres)

Population (2011)
  - Total: 517
  - Density: 155/km^{2} (402/sq mi)
- Sex ratio 294/223 ♂/♀

Languages
  - Official: Marathi
  - Other spoken: Hindi
- Time zone: UTC+5:30 (IST)
- Pin code: 410405
- Telephone code: 02114
- ISO 3166 code: IN-MH
- Vehicle registration: MH-14
- Website: pune.nic.in

Mundhavare is a village and gram panchayat in India, situated in Mawal taluka of Pune district in the state of Maharashtra. It encompasses an area of 333.30 ha (824 acres).

== Administration ==
The village is administrated by a sarpanch, an elected representative who leads a gram panchayat. At the time of the 2011 Census of India, the village was the headquarters for the eponymous gram panchayat, which also governed the villages of Vadivale and Valakh, as well as the uninhabited village of Phagane.

== Demographics ==
At the 2011 census, the village comprised 91 households. The population of 517 was split between 294 males and 223 females.

== Air travel connectivity ==
The closest airport to the village is Pune Airport.

== See also ==
- List of villages in Mawal taluka
