= Yaosang =

Indian Indigenous festival of the Meitei

Yaoshang
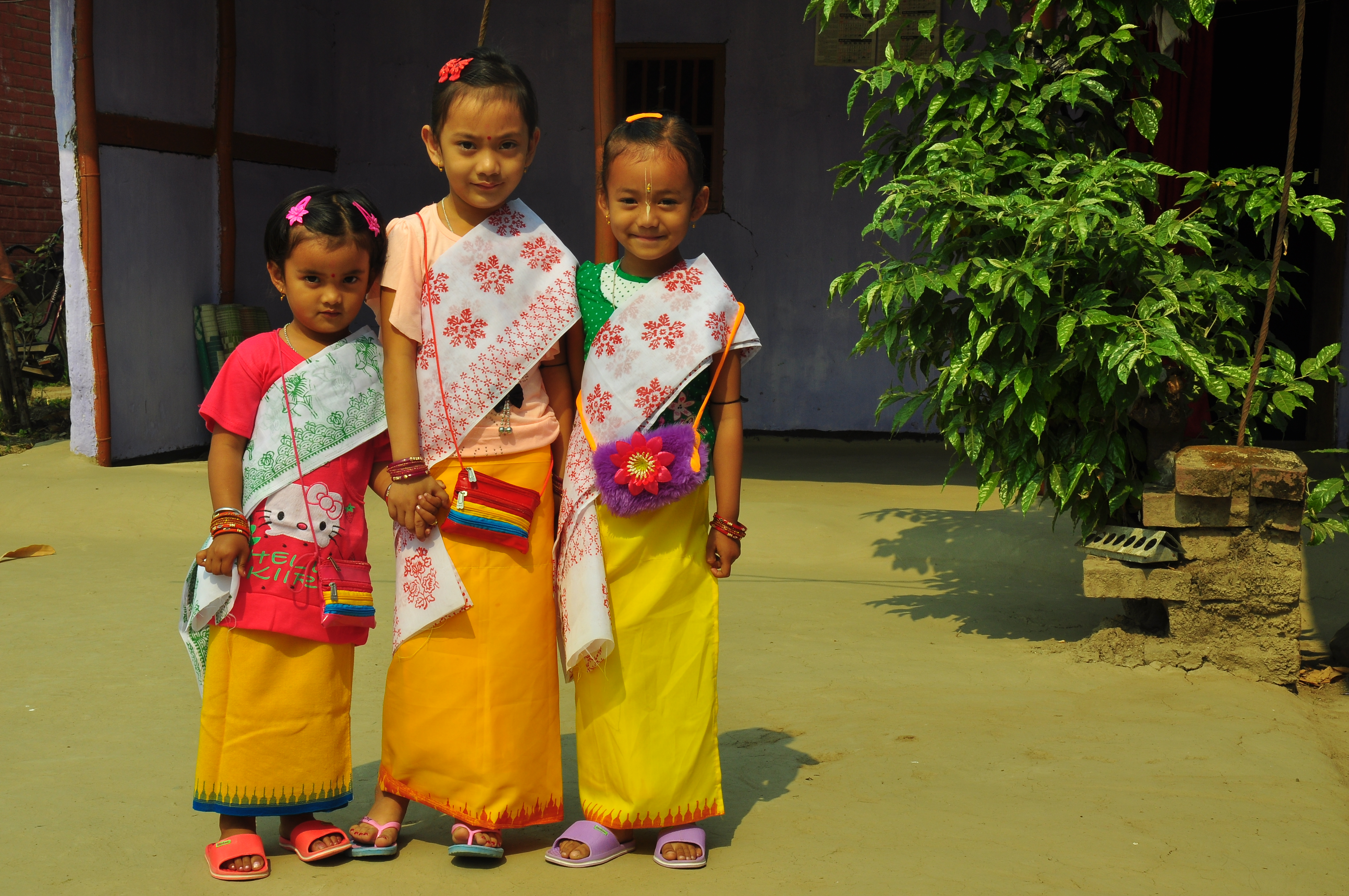
- Perhaps kids in traditional attire going for Nakatheng is the most sought after sight during the Yaosang festival
- Observed by: Meitei people
- Type: Religious, cultural, sports, spring festival
- Celebrations: After firing the temporary house, people started to celebrate it with colors, sports, dance and feasts.
- Date: as per Meitei calendar
- Frequency: Annual
- Related to: Holi, Hola Mohalla and Shigmo

Yaosang is a festival celebrated in Manipur for five days in spring, starting on the full moon day of the month of Lamta (February–March). Yaosang is an indigenous tradition of the Meitei people. It is considered the most important festival in Manipur. But unlike Holi, the celebrations go far beyond just colours.

== Description ==
Yaosang begins just after sunset in every village with the Yaosang Mei thaba, or Burning of the Straw Hut on the night of the fullmoon of Manipuri month of Lamta. Then the children ask at every house for monetary donations, called nakatheng. On the second day, groups of local bands perform sankirtan in the Govindagee Temple in the Imphal-East district of Manipur. On the second and third days, girls go to their relatives for their nakatheng and block roads with ropes for collecting money. On the fourth and fifth days, people pour or splash water on one another. A number of sport events like tug of war and soccer are also organised on this occasion. Apart from this, the local delicacies are also shared with the neighbours during the festival.

Some recent trends during the festival of Yaoshang are music concerts, DJ and other forms of entertainment at open spaces. Local bands performs during such concerts.

== Dance ==
Another feature of this festival is Thabal Chongba (Dancing in the Moonlight). Men from various places will come to the site of the festival and dance in circles with the women, holding their hands. In 2016, this occurred 23–24 March.

== Celebrations ==
The locals also engage in feasting to celebrate this festival of merrymaking. Of late, there has been a trend of channelling the festive energy toward sporting events to spot out talents at the grassroot level, which is in line with the rich sporting spirit of the Meiteis.

== Gallery ==
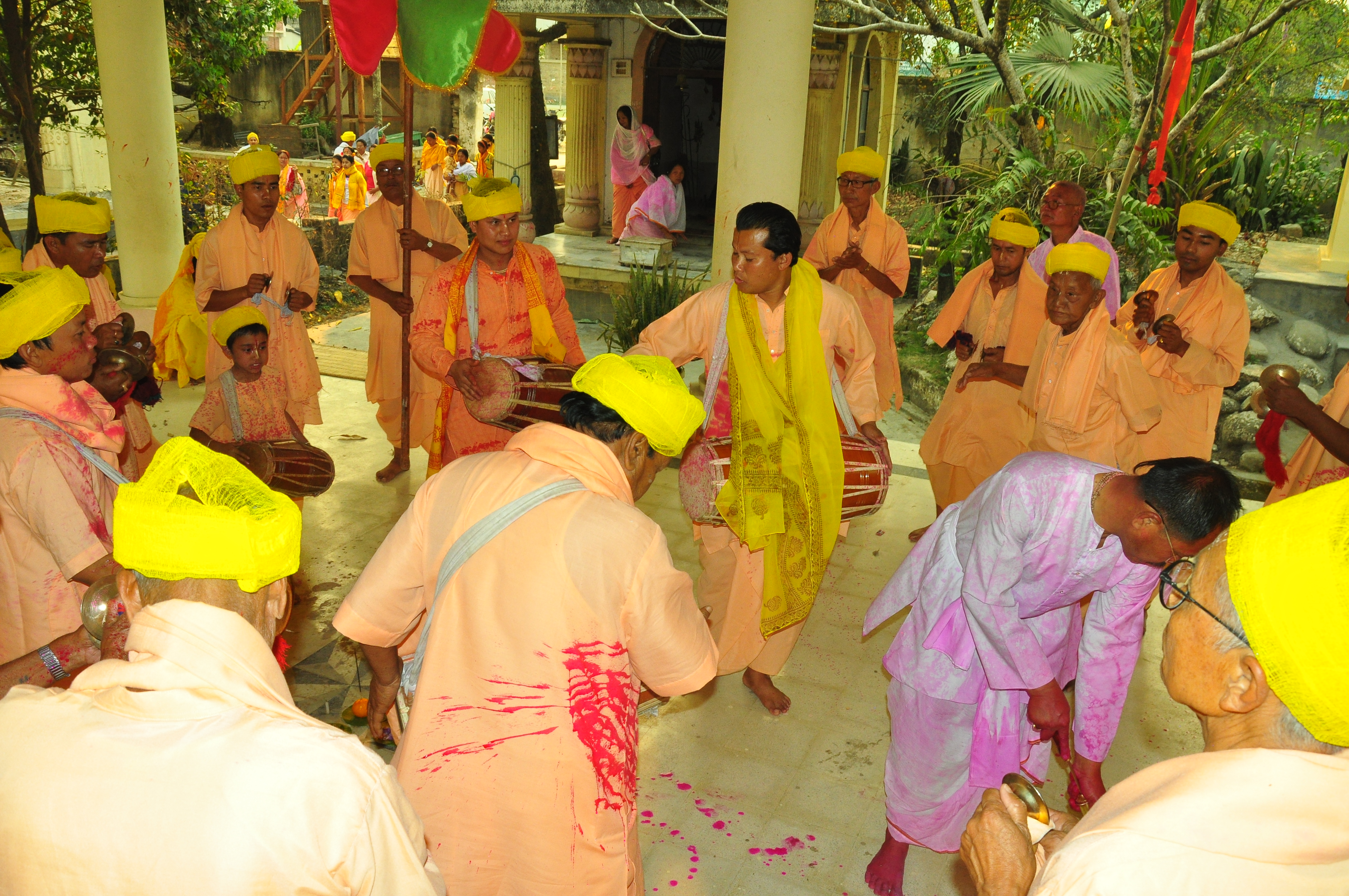
A typical Meitei Holi group performing in Govindagee Temple on the second day of Yaosang.

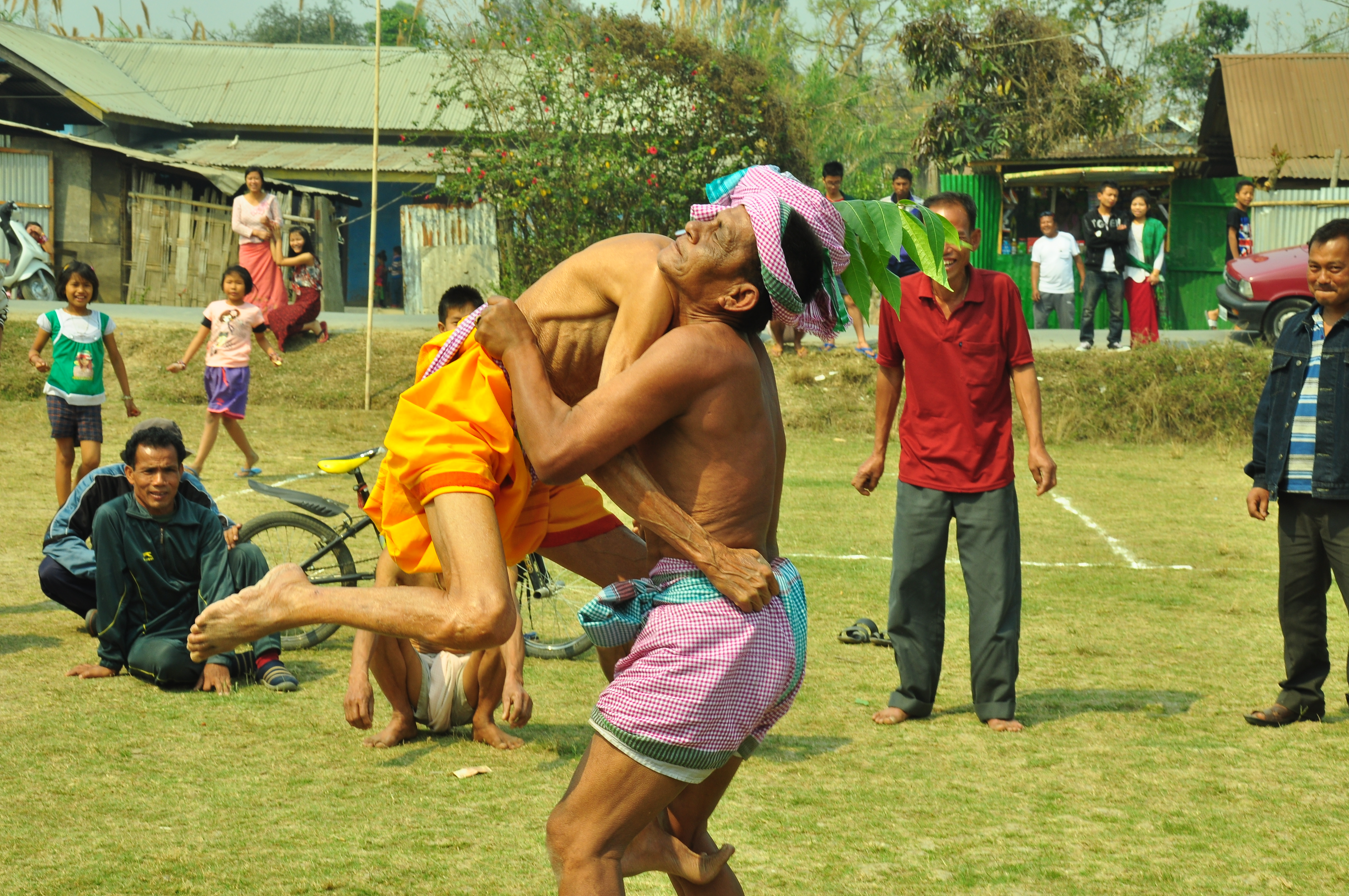
As a part of the Yaosang sports festival, old folks show off their skill in a traditional form of wrestling known as mukna. These two gentlemen were more than 80 years old.

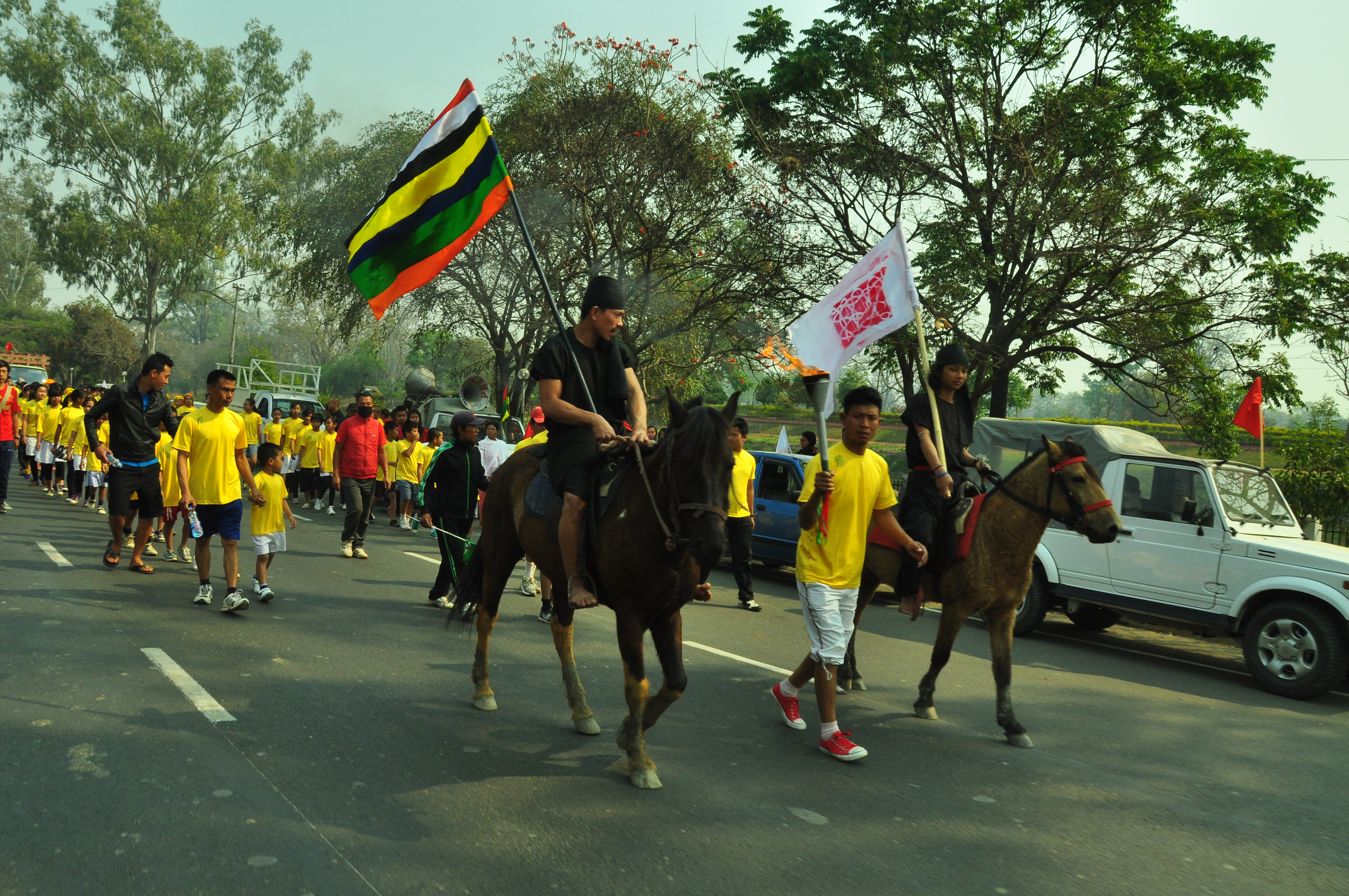
Horse Riders leading the way to the Kangla Fort while a Meitei holds the torch to inaugurate the sports festival on the first day of Yaosang.
