= Thabal chongba =

Manipuri folk dance

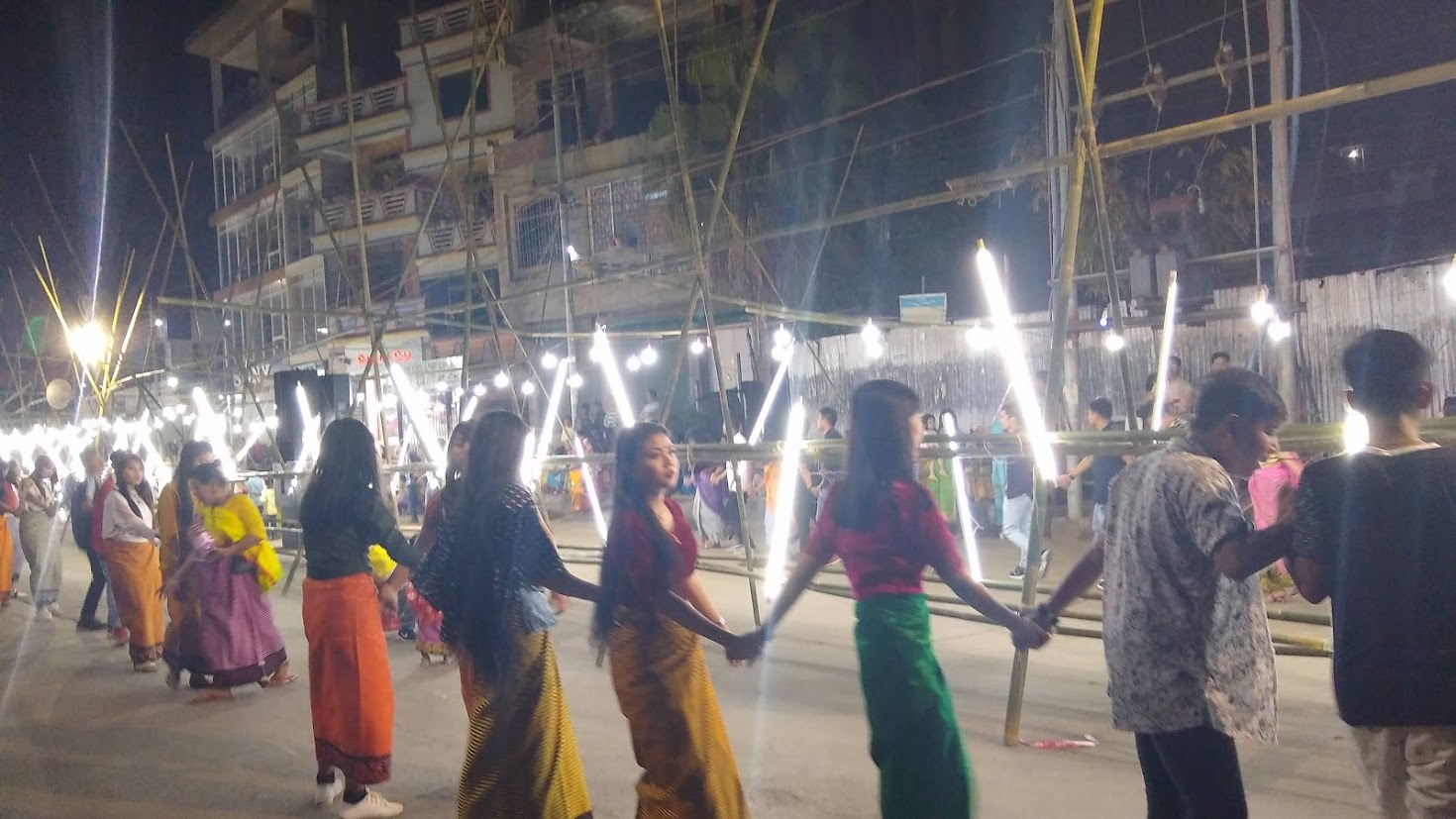
- Thabal chongba at Imphal, 2019
- Status: Active
- Frequency: Annually
- Location: Manipur
- Country: India

Thabal chongba is a Manipuri folk dance traditionally performed during the festival of Yaoshang in India. In the dance, participants join hands in a circle, hop on one foot and swing their free legs across, slowly advancing.

== Description ==
In earlier times, this dance was performed in the moonlight accompanied by folk songs. The music is rhythmic beating of drums accompanied by other instruments. It is performed in every locality on all the five days of the festival. As soon as the moon rises over the hills, the flute, drums and cymbals start. The boys and girls in a circle clutch each other's hands with rhythms of music slow and fast, high and low, up and down. If the number is great they may form two or three rows so that everybody and anybody can participate in the dance.

== See also ==
- Circle dance
