= List of birds of the Andaman and Nicobar Islands =

This article lists the species of bird found in the Andaman and Nicobar Islands. 410 species of birds have been sighted on the islands, out of which 28 are endemic to the islands. The state bird of the Andaman and the Nicobar Islands is the Andaman wood pigeon. This list's taxonomic treatment (designation and sequence of orders, families and species) and nomenclature (common and scientific names) follow the conventions of the IOC World Bird List, version 11.2. This list also uses British English throughout. Any bird names or other wording follows that convention.

There are two birdlife zones in the union territory, as defined by Birdlife International -

- Andaman Islands
- Nicobar Islands

The following tags have been used to highlight several categories. The commonly occurring native species do not fit within any of these categories.

- (A) Accidental - also known as a rarity, it refers to a species that rarely or accidentally occurs in the Andaman and Nicobar Islands - typically less than ten confirmed records
- (I) Introduced - a species introduced to the Andaman and Nicobar Islands as a consequence, direct or indirect, of human actions.
- (E) Endemic - a species which is endemic to the Andaman and Nicobar Islands.

== Undescribed species ==
In 2012, Rajeshkumar, Rasmussen and Ragunathan described a possibly new species of Rallina crake which they called the Great Nicobar crake. The bird had an entire pale green bill, and orange-red legs, which differed from any known species of bird. However, in 2021, Slaty-legged crakes and Red-legged crakes were found in the Nicobar Islands. This made it possible that the bird was a hybrid. However, neither of the two crakes shared any of the unique features of the Great Nicobar crake.

== Endemic species ==
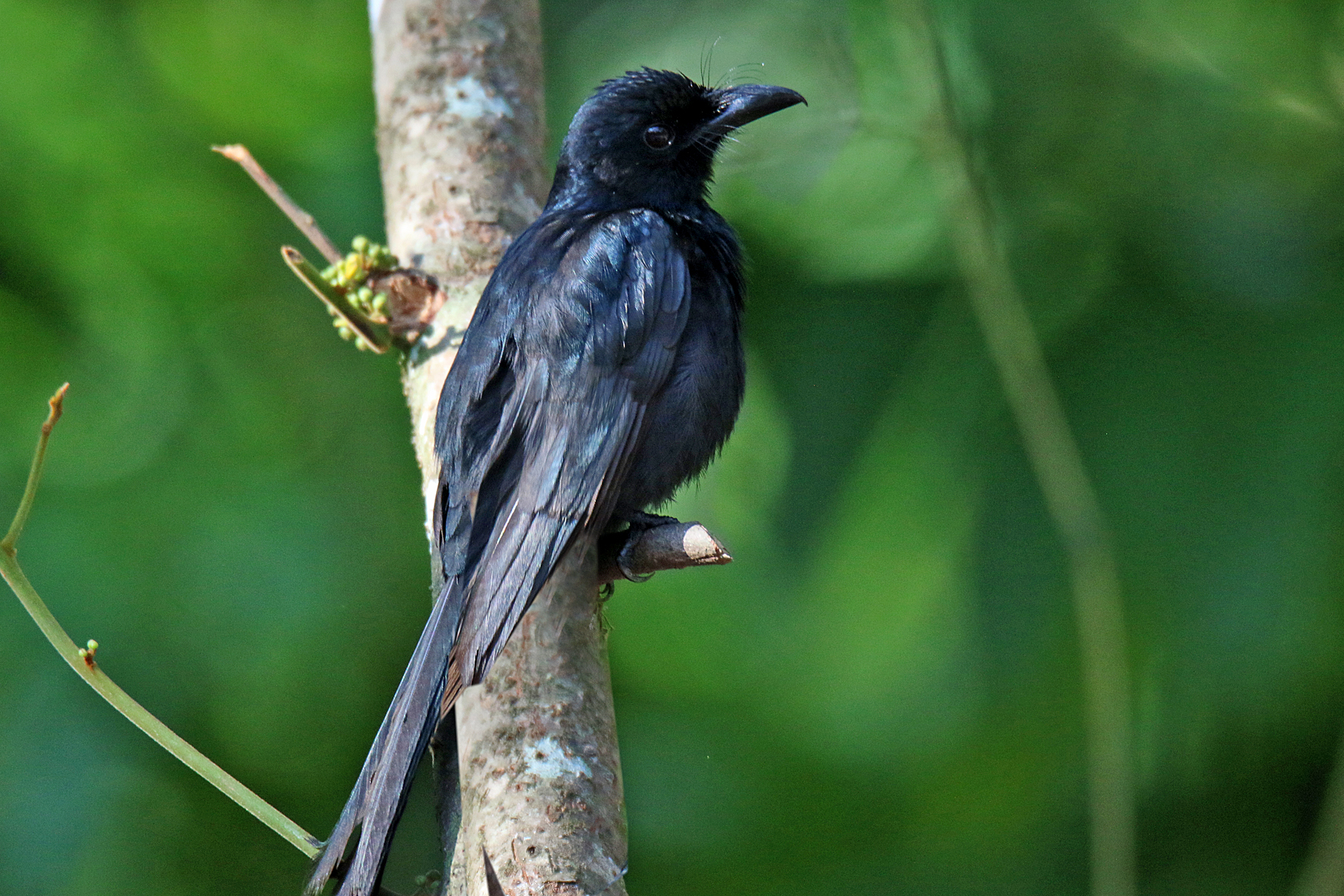
Andaman drongo

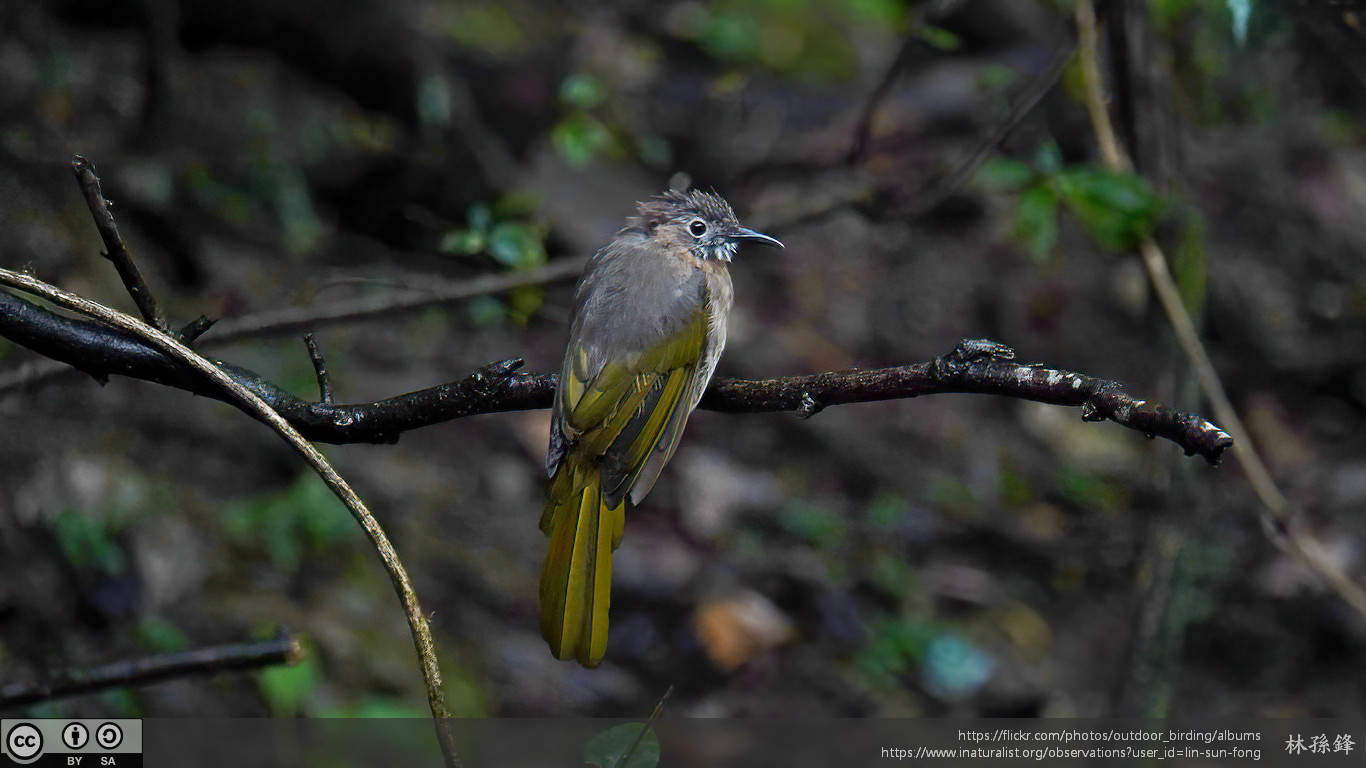
Nicobar bulbul

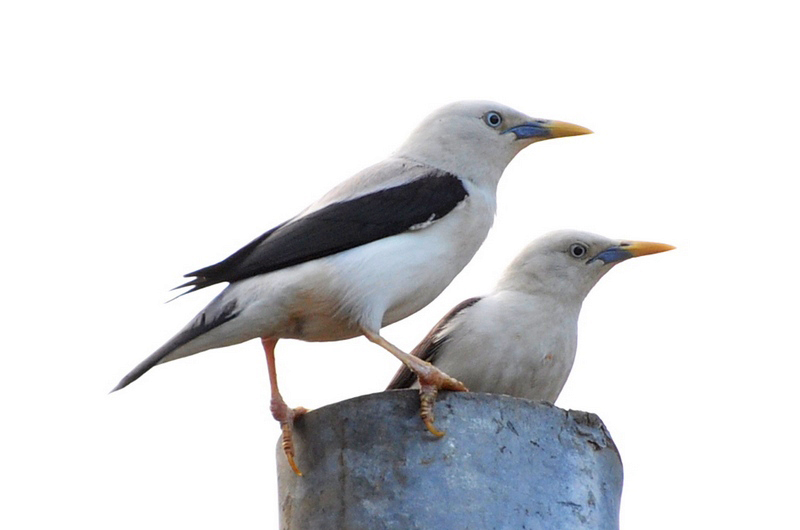
White-headed starling

The following is a list of species endemic to the Andaman and Nicobar Islands by region:

=== Species endemic to the Andaman Islands ===
- Andaman serpent-eagle, Spilornis elgini
- Andaman crake, Rallina canningi
- Andaman scops owl, Otus balli
- Hume's boobook, Ninox obscura
- Andaman barn-owl, Tyto deroepstorffi
- Andaman nightjar, Caprimulgus andamanicus
- Narcondam hornbill, Rhyticeros narcondami
- Andaman woodpecker, Dryocopus hodgei
- Andaman drongo, Dicrurus andamanensis
- Andaman treepie, Dendrocitta bayleyii
- Andaman shama, Copsychus albiventris
- Andaman bulbul, Pycnonotus fuscoflavescens
- Andaman cuckooshrike, Coracina dobsoni
- Andaman flowerpecker, Dicaeum virescens

=== Species endemic to the Nicobar Islands ===
- Nicobar imperial-pigeon, Ducula nicobarica
- South Nicobar serpent eagle, Spilornis klossi
- Nicobar sparrowhawk, Accipiter butleri
- Nicobar parakeet, Psittacula caniceps
- Nicobar bulbul, Ixos nicobariensis
- Nicobar jungle flycatcher, Cyornis nicobaricus
- Nicobar scops-owl, Otus alius
- Nicobar megapode, Megapodius nicobariensis (possibly extirpated over Andaman range)

=== Species endemic to the two island groups ===
- Andaman woodpigeon, Columba palumboides
- Andaman green pigeon, Treron chloropterus
- Andaman cuckoo-dove, Macropygia rufipennis
- Andaman boobook, Ninox affinis
- White-headed starling, Sturnia erythropygia

== Ducks, geese and swans ==
Order: Anseriformes Family: Anatidae

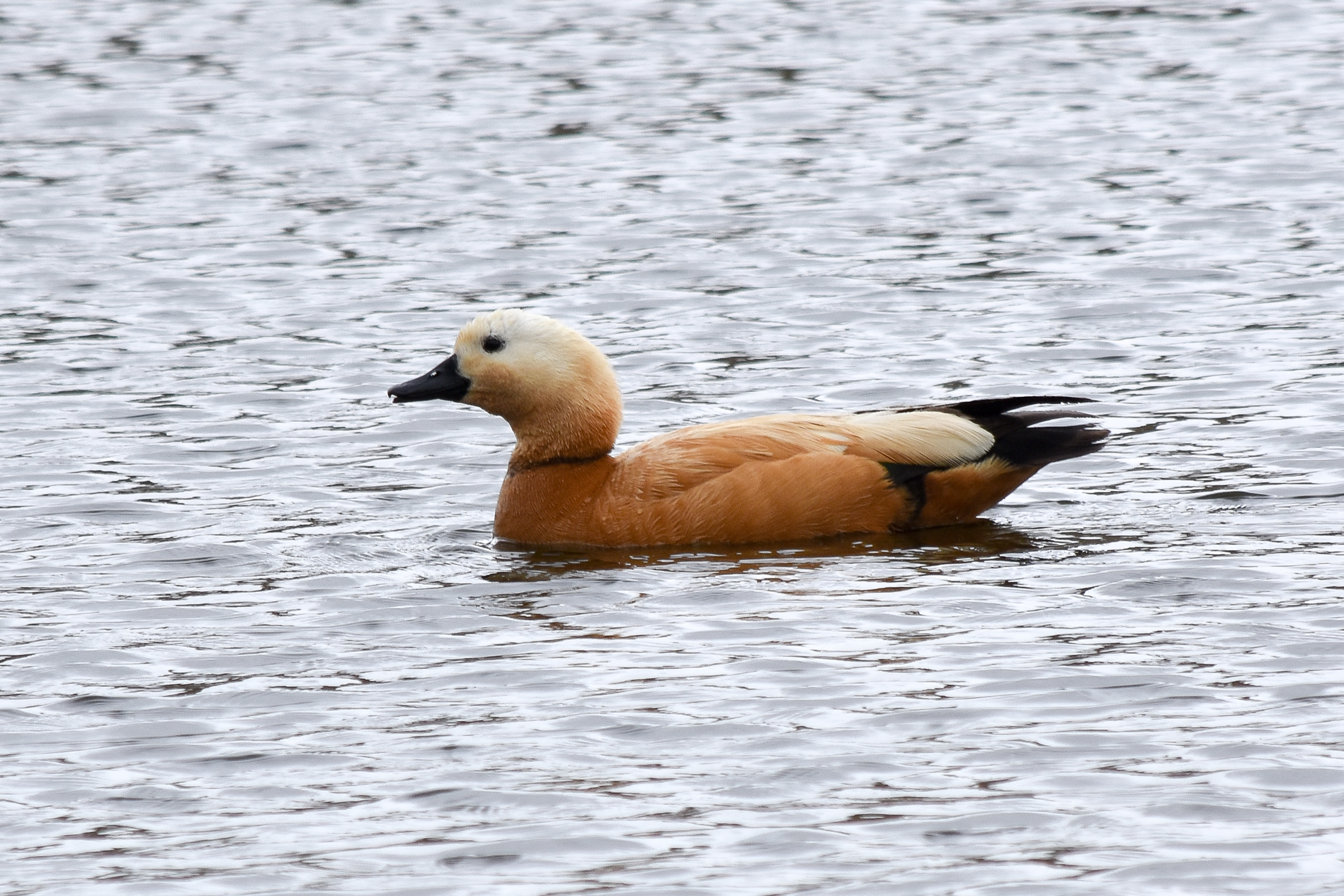
Ruddy shelduck

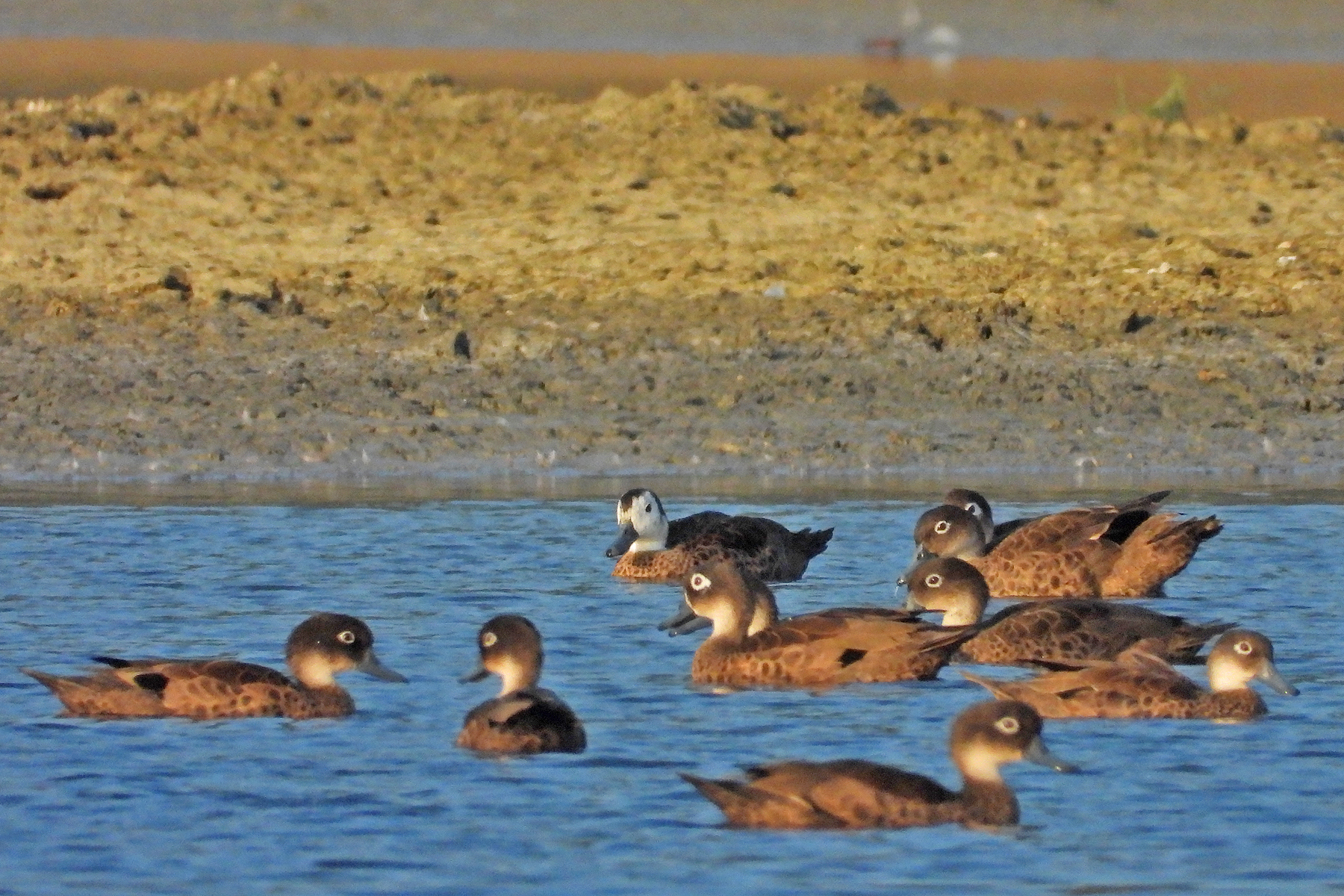
Andaman teal

Anatidae includes the ducks and most duck-like waterfowl, such as geese and swans. These birds are adapted to an aquatic existence with webbed feet, flattened bills, and feathers that are excellent at shedding water due to an oily coating. There are 15 species which have been recorded on the islands.

Common name	Binomial	Comments
Lesser whistling duck	Dendrocygna javanica	
Knob-billed duck	Sarkidiornis melanotos	(I)
Ruddy shelduck	Tadorna ferruginea	(A)
Mandarin duck	Aix galericulata	(A)
Cotton pygmy goose	Nettapus coromandelianus	
Garganey	Spatula querquedula	
Northern shoveler	Spatula clypeata	(A)
Eurasian wigeon	Mareca penelope	
Eastern spot-billed duck	Anas zonorhyncha	(A)
Northern pintail	Anas acuta	
Eurasian teal	Anas crecca	(A)
Andaman teal	Anas albogularis	(E) Near-threatened
Red-crested pochard	Netta rufina	(A)
Ferruginous duck	Aythya nyroca	(A) Near-threatened
Tufted duck	Aythya fuligula	(A)

== Megapodes ==
Order: Galliformes Family: Megapodiidae

The Megapodiidae are stocky, medium-large chicken-like birds with small heads and large feet. All but the malleefowl occupy jungle habitats and most have brown or black colouring. There is one species within India, which is endemic to the islands.

Common name	Binomial	Comments
Nicobar megapode	Megapodius nicobariensis	(E); vulnerable

== Pheasants and allies ==
Order: Galliformes Family: Phasianidae

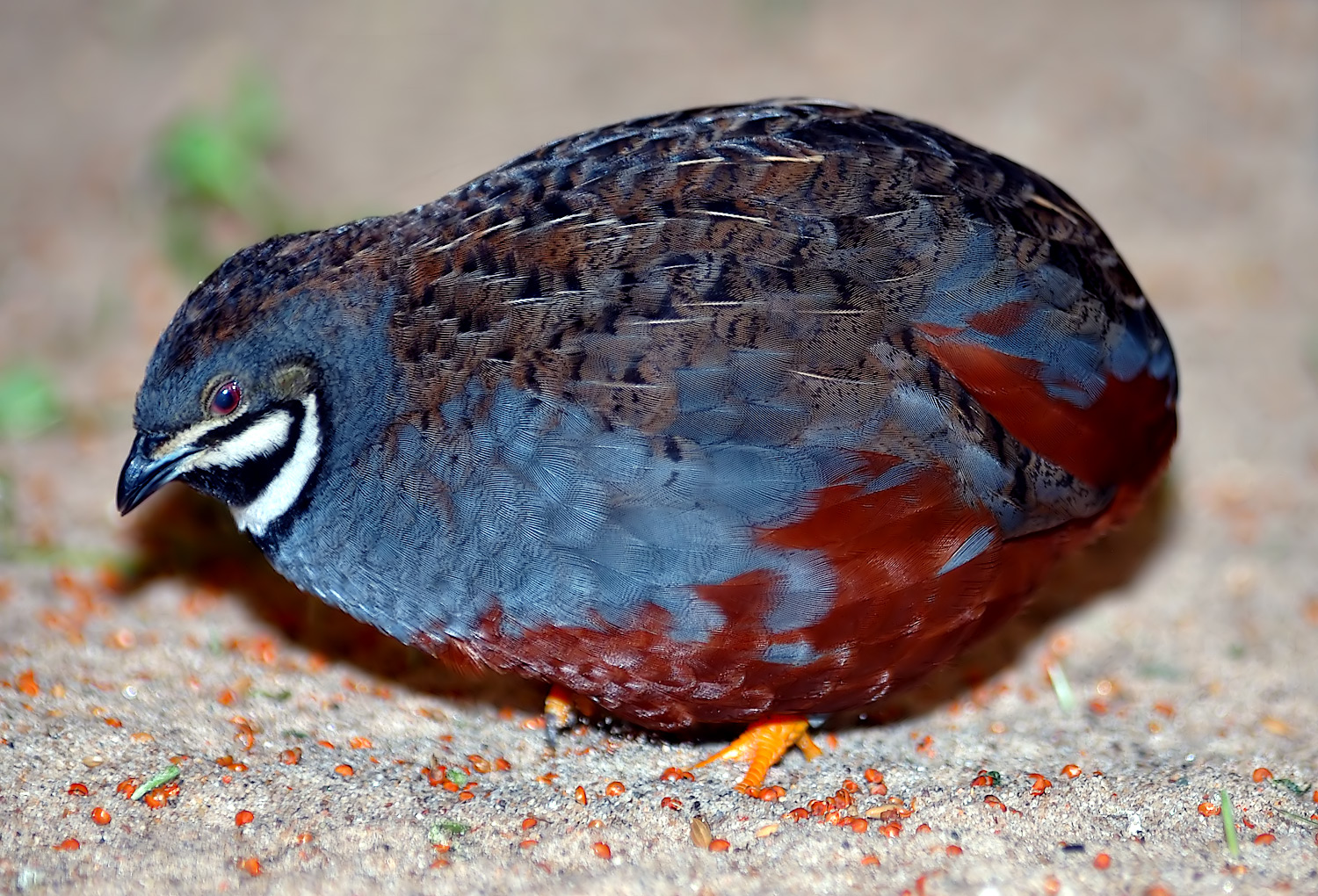
King quail

The Phasianidae are a family of terrestrial birds which consists of quails, partridges, snowcocks, francolins, spurfowl, tragopans, monals, pheasants, peafowls and jungle fowls. In general, they are plump (although they vary in size) and have broad, relatively short wings. Seven species have been recorded on the islands.

Common name	Binomial	Comments
Indian peafowl	Pavo cristatus	(I)
Grey francolin	Ortygornis pondicerianus	(A)
Chinese francolin	Francolinus pintadeanus	Extirpated
King quail	Synoicus chinensis	
Common quail	Coturnix coturnix	Extirpated
Jungle bush quail	Perdicula asiatica	Extirpated
Painted bush quail	Perdicula erythrorhyncha	Extirpated

== Nightjars ==
Order: Caprimulgiformes Family: Caprimulgidae

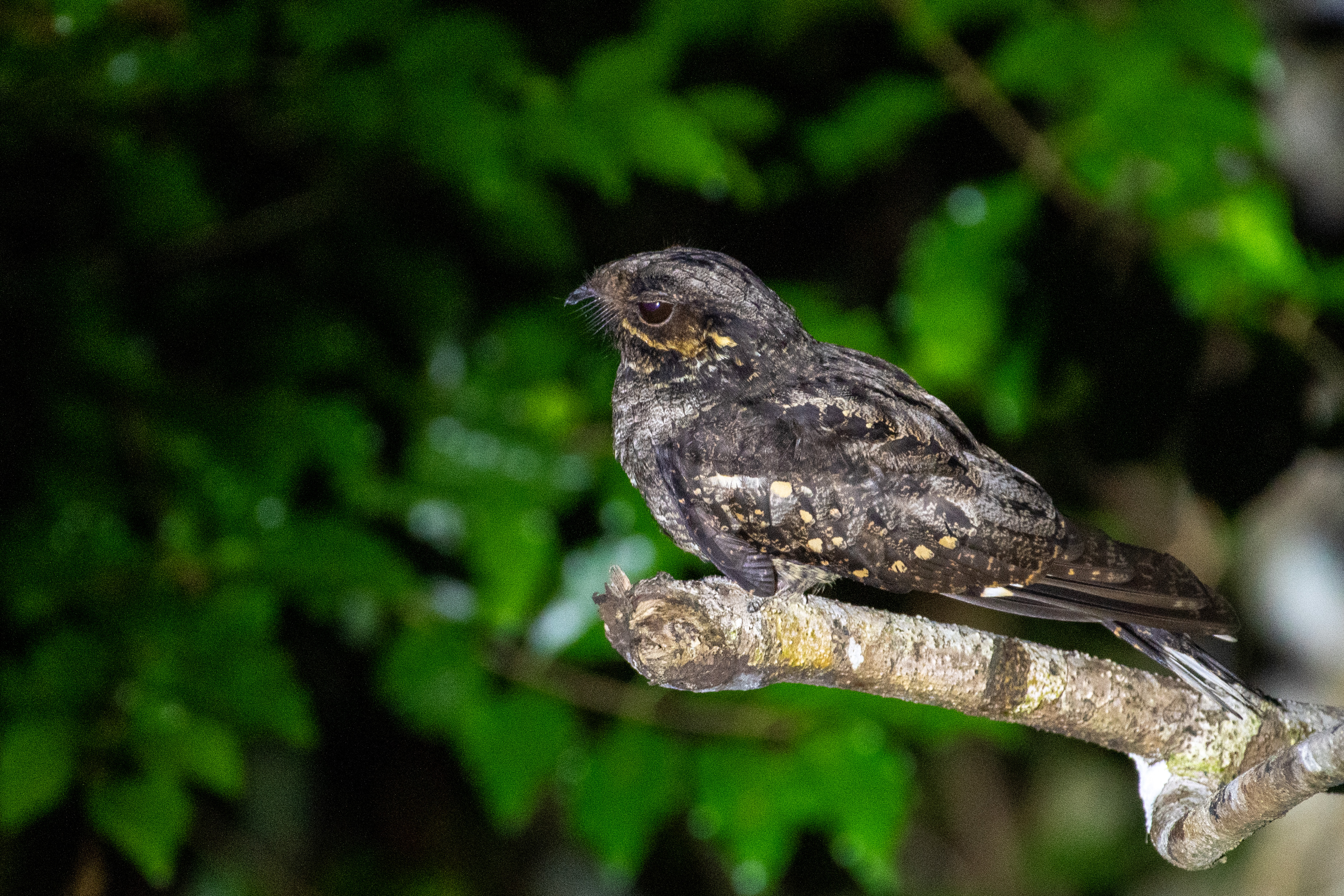
Andaman nightjar

Nightjars are medium-sized nocturnal birds that usually nest on the ground. They have long wings, short legs and very short bills. Most have small feet, of little use for walking, and long pointed wings. Their soft plumage is camouflaged to resemble bark or leaves. Five species have been recorded on the islands.

Common name	Binomial	Comments
Jungle nightjar	Caprimulgus indicus	(A)
Grey nightjar	Caprimulgus jotaka	
Large-tailed nightjar	Caprimulgus macrurus	
Andaman nightjar	Caprimulgus andamanicus	(E)
Savanna nightjar	Caprimulgus affinis	

== Swifts ==
Order: Apodiformes Family: Apodidae

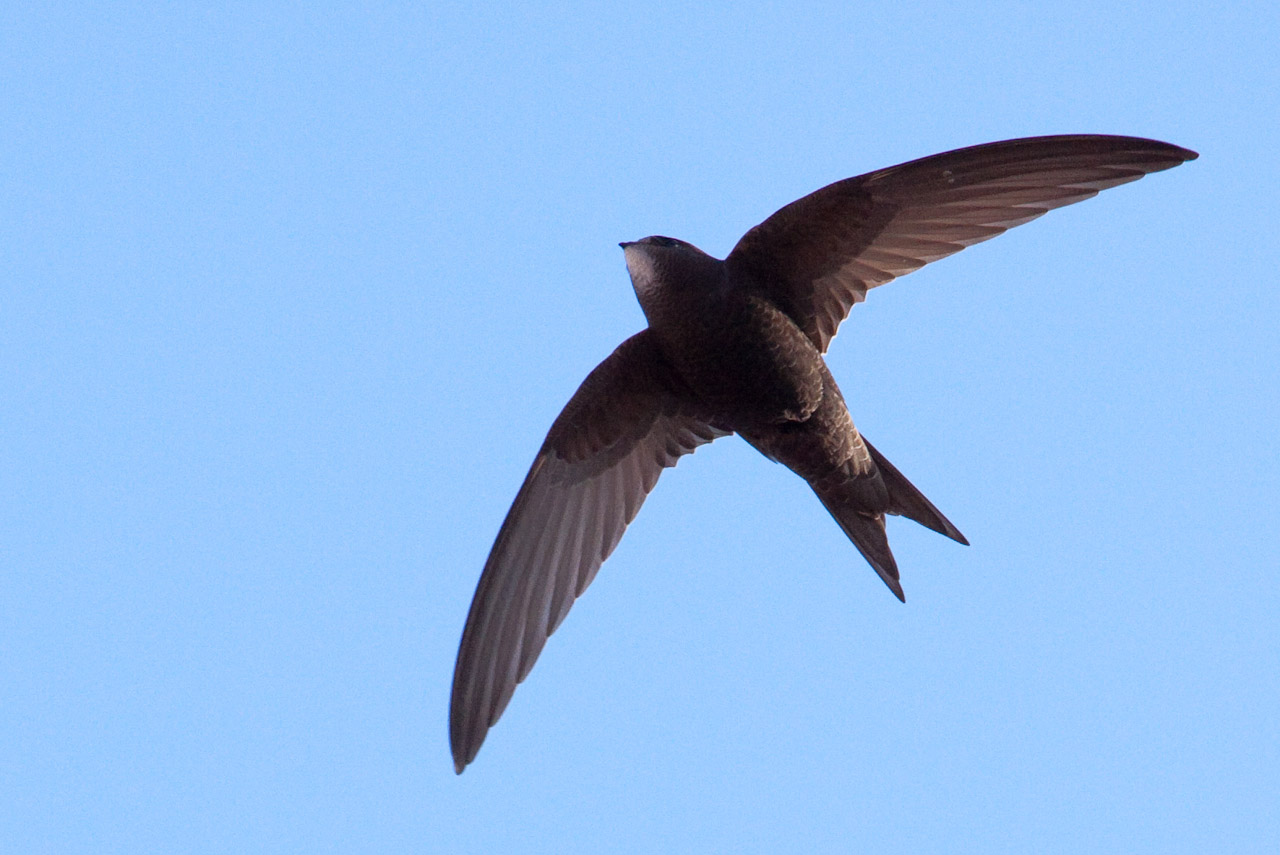
Common swift

Swifts are small birds which spend the majority of their lives flying. These birds have very short legs and never settle voluntarily on the ground, perching instead only on vertical surfaces. Many swifts have long swept-back wings which resemble a crescent or boomerang. There are 11 species which have been recorded on the islands.

Common name	Binomial	Comments
Plume-toed swiftlet	Collocalia affinis	
Himalayan swiftlet	Aerodramus brevirostris	(A)
Edible-nest swiftlet	Aerodramus fuciphagus	
White-throated needletail	Hirundapus caudacutus	
Brown-backed needletail	Hirundapus giganteus	
Asian palm swift	Cypsiurus balasiensis	
Common swift	Apus apus	(A)
Pacific swift	Apus pacificus ssp. kurodae	(A)
Blyth's swift	Apus leuconyx	
Dark-rumped swift	Apus acuticauda	(A) Near-threatened
House swift	Apus nipalensis	

== Cuckoos ==
Order: Cuculiformes Family: Cuculidae

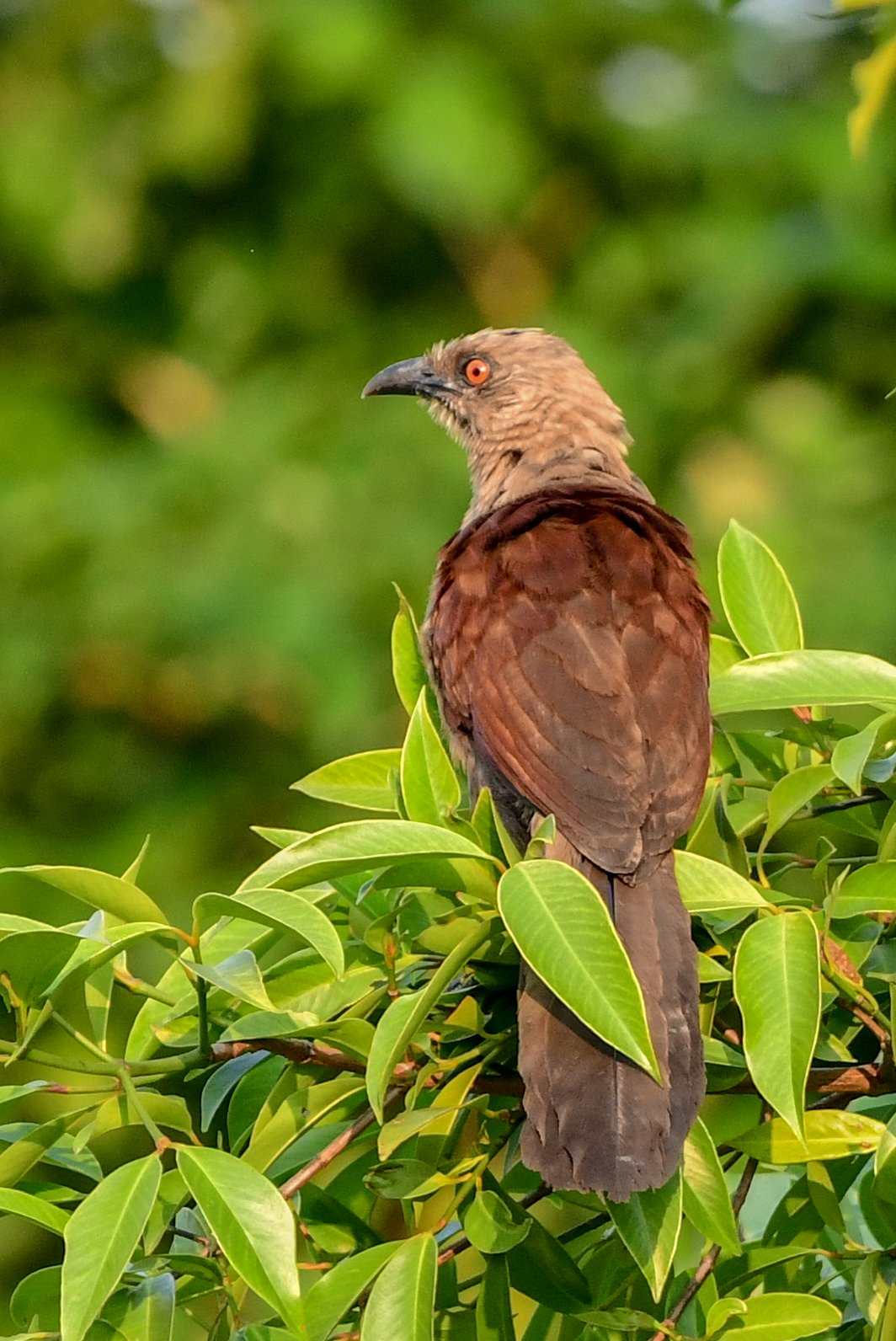
Andaman coucal

The family Cuculidae includes cuckoos, roadrunners and anis. These birds are of variable size with slender bodies, long tails and strong legs. Many are brood parasites. There are 19 species which have been recorded on the islands.

Common name	Binomial	Comments
Lesser coucal	Centropus bengalensis	(A)
Andaman coucal	Centropus andamanensis	
Chestnut-winged cuckoo	Clamator coromandus	
Jacobin cuckoo	Clamator jacobinus	(A)
Asian koel	Eudynamys scolopaceus	
Asian emerald cuckoo	Chrysococcyx maculatus	(A)
Violet cuckoo	Chrysococcyx xanthorhynchus	
Horsfield's bronze cuckoo	Chrysococcyx basalis	(A)
Banded bay cuckoo	Cacomantis sonneratii	(A)
Plaintive cuckoo	Cacomantis merulinus	
Grey-bellied cuckoo	Cacomantis passerinus	
Square-tailed drongo-cuckoo	Surniculus lugubris	
Large hawk-cuckoo	Hierococcyx sparverioides	
Common hawk-cuckoo	Hierococcyx varius	
Hodgson's hawk-cuckoo	Hierococcyx nisicolor	
Lesser cuckoo	Cuculus poliocephalus	
Indian cuckoo	Cuculus micropterus	
Himalayan cuckoo	Cuculus saturatus	
Common cuckoo	Cuculus canorus	

== Pigeons and doves ==
Order: Columbiformes Family: Columbidae

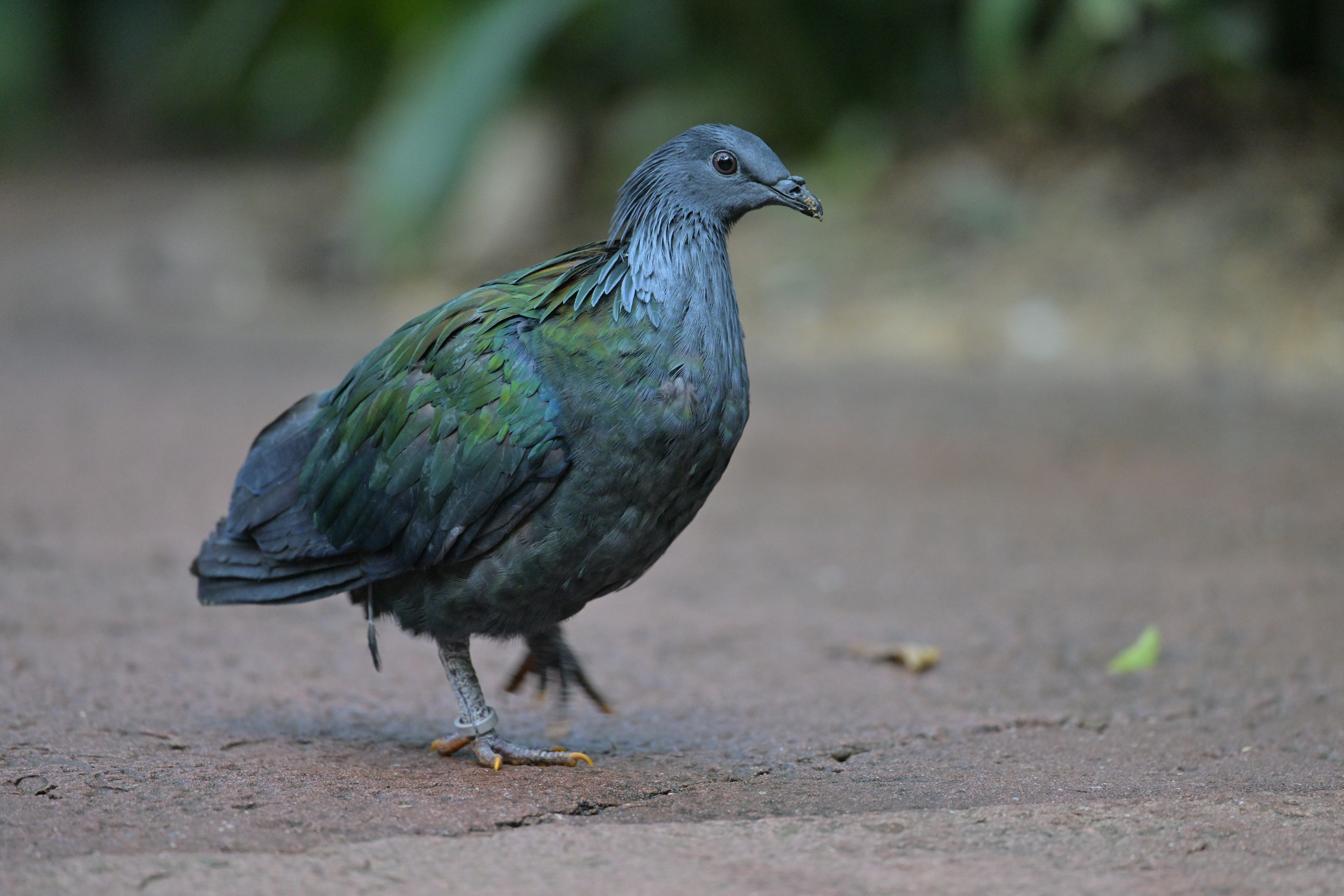
Nicobar pigeon

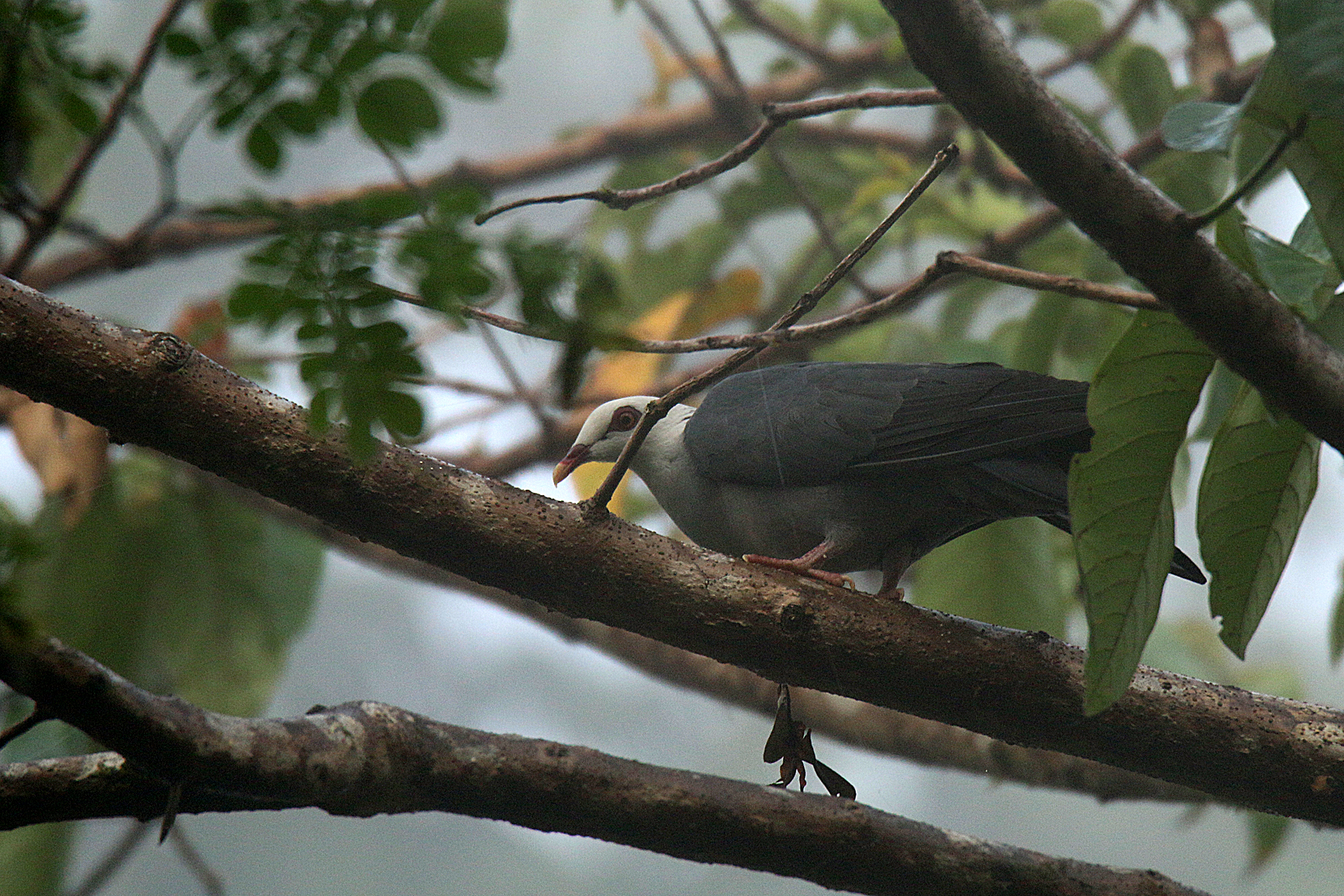
Andaman wood pigeon, the state bird

Pigeons and doves are stout-bodied birds with short necks and short slender bills with a fleshy cere. A total of 14 species have been recorded on the islands.

Common name	Binomial	Comments
Rock dove	Columba livia	(I)
Andaman wood pigeon	Columba palumboides	(E) Near-threatened
Oriental turtle dove	Streptopelia orientalis	
Eurasian collared dove	Streptopelia decaocto	
Red collared dove	Streptopelia tranquebarica	
Spotted dove	Spilopelia chinensis	
Laughing dove	Spilopelia senegalensis	Extirpated
Andaman cuckoo-dove	Macropygia rufipennis	(E)
Common emerald dove	Chalcophaps indica	
Nicobar pigeon	Caloenas nicobarica	Near-threatened
Andaman green pigeon	Treron chloropterus	(E) Near-threatened
Green imperial pigeon	Ducula aenea	Near-threatened
Nicobar imperial pigeon	Ducula nicobarica	(E) Near-threatened
Pied imperial pigeon	Ducula bicolor	

== Rails, crakes, and coots ==
Order: Gruiformes Family: Rallidae

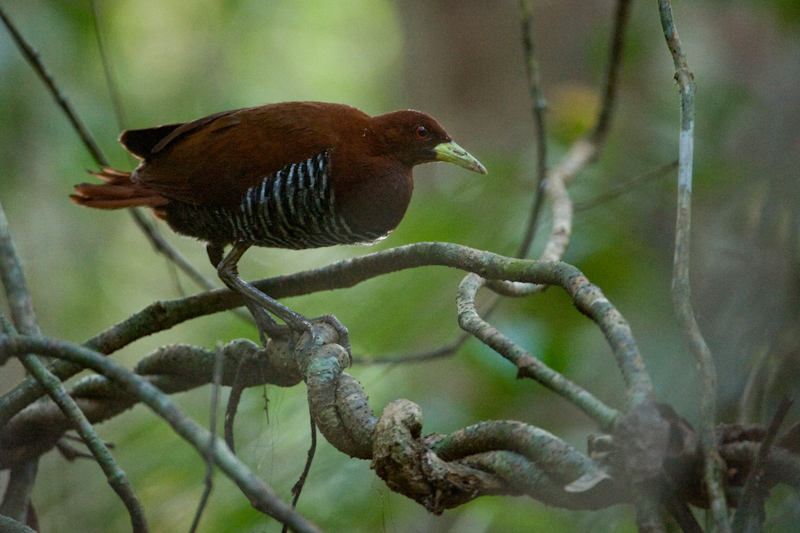
Andaman crake

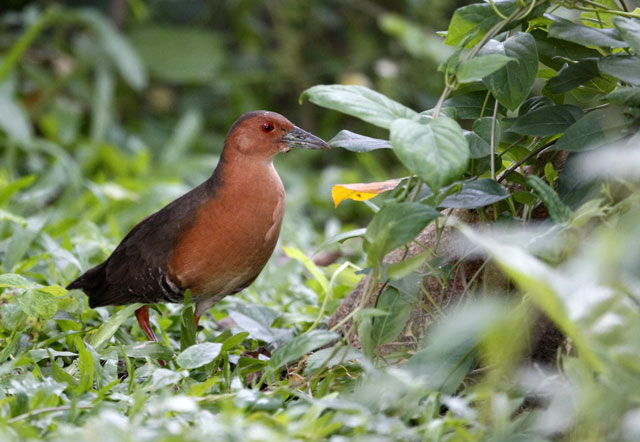
Band-bellied crake

Rallidae is a large family of small to medium-sized birds which includes the rails, crakes, coots and gallinules. Typically they inhabit dense vegetation in damp environments near lakes, swamps or rivers. In general they are shy and secretive birds, making them difficult to observe, though some are bold and conspicuous. Most species have strong legs and long toes which are well adapted to soft uneven surfaces. They tend to have short, rounded wings and to be weak fliers.

Common name	Binomial	Comments
Corn crake	Crex crex	(A)
Slaty-breasted rail	Lewinia striata	
Common moorhen	Gallinula chloropus	
Eurasian coot	Fulica atra	
Grey-headed swamphen	Porphyrio poliocephalus	
Ruddy-breasted crake	Zapornia fusca	
Band-bellied crake	Zapornia paykullii	(A) Near-threatened
Baillon's crake	Zapornia pusilla	
Slaty-legged crake	Rallina eurizonoides	(A)
Andaman crake	Rallina canningi	(E)
Red-legged crake	Rallina fasciata	(A)
White-browed crake	Poliolimnas cinereus	(A)
Watercock	Gallicrex cinerea	
White-breasted waterhen	Amaurornis phoenicurus	

== Grebes ==
Order: Podicipediformes Family: Podicipedidae

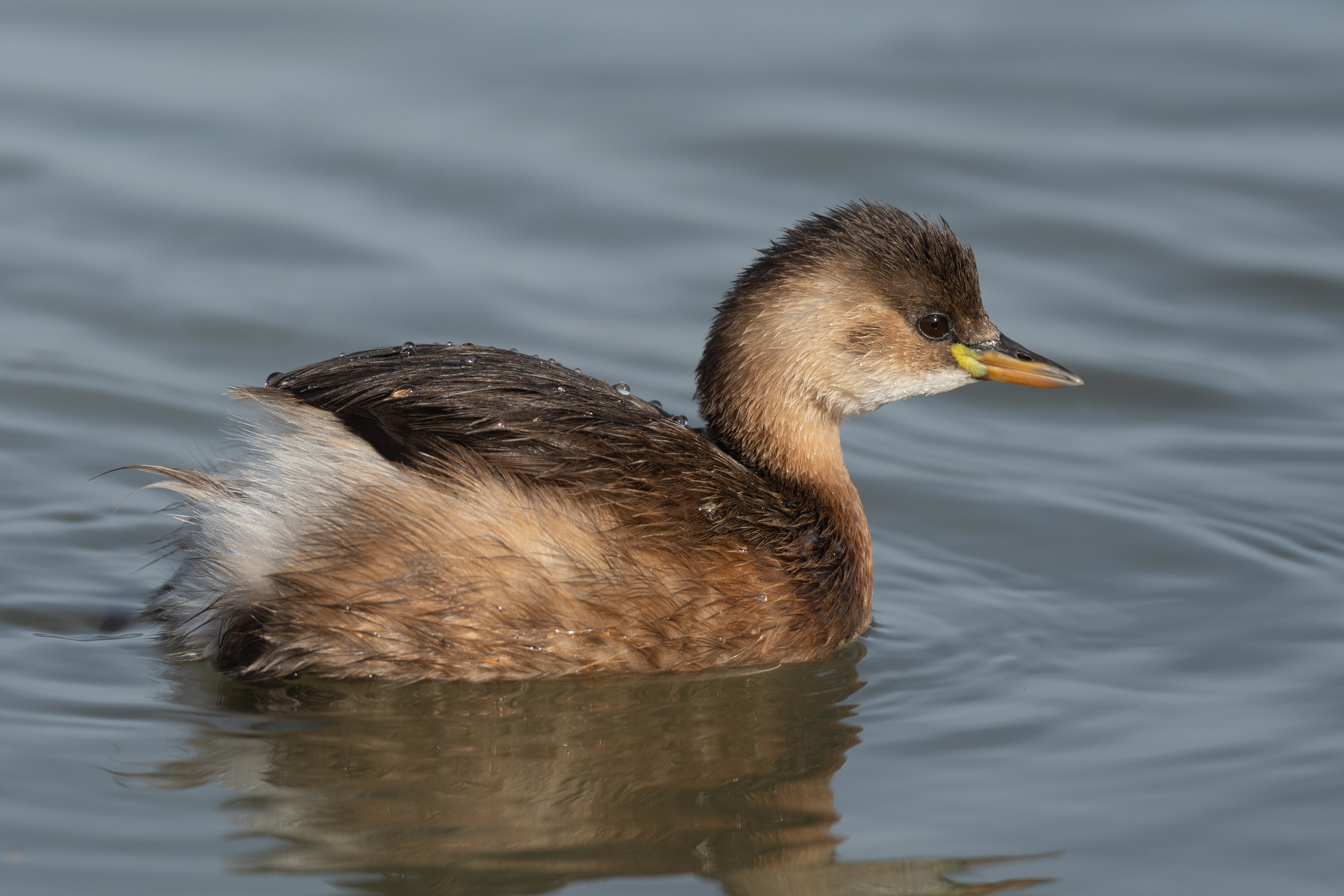
Little grebe

Grebes are small to medium-large freshwater diving birds. They have lobed toes and are excellent swimmers and divers. However, they have their feet placed far back on the body, making them quite ungainly on land. One species, the little grebe is found on the islands.

Common name	Binomial	Comments
Little grebe	Tachybaptus ruficollis	

== Buttonquails ==
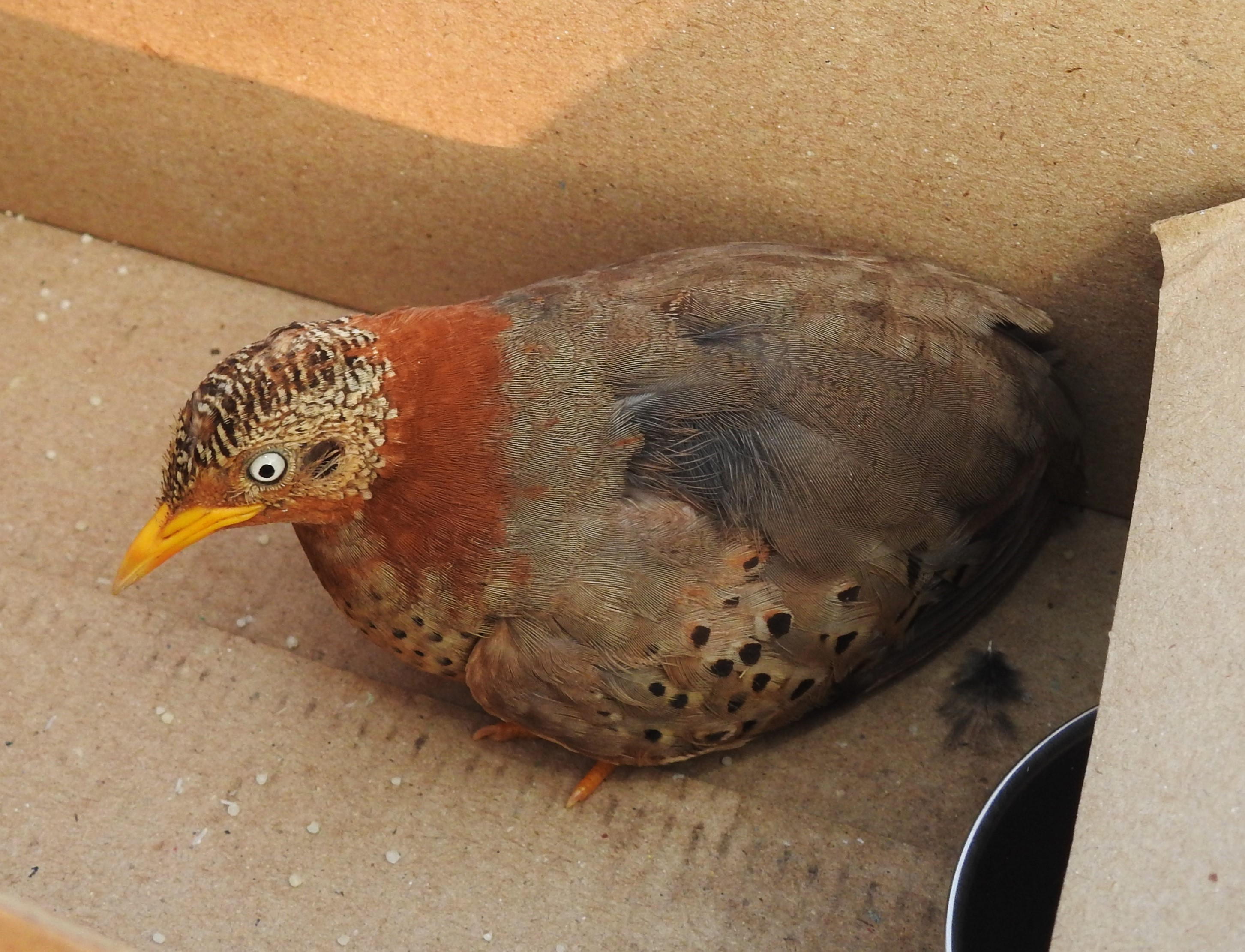
Yellow-legged buttonquail

Order: Charadriiformes Family: Turnicidae

The buttonquails are small, drab, running birds which resemble the true quails. The female is the brighter of the sexes and initiates courtship. The male incubates the eggs and tends the young. One species, the yellow-legged buttonquail, is found on the islands.

Common name	Binomial	Comments
Yellow-legged buttonquail	Turnix tanki	

== Stone-curlews and thick-knees ==
Order: Charadriiformes Family: Burhinidae

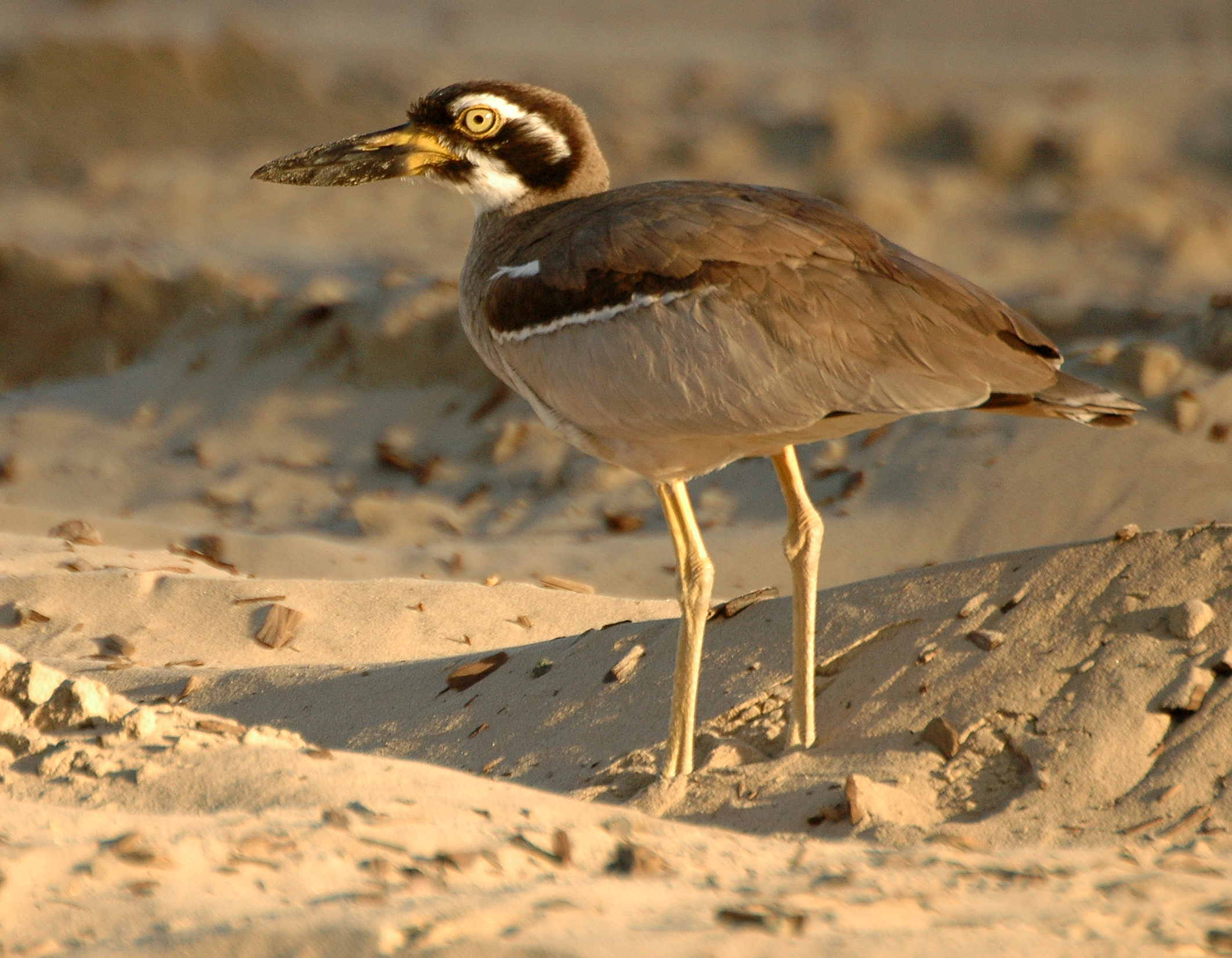
Beach stone-curlew

Stone-curlews are a group of largely tropical waders in the family Burhinidae. They are found worldwide within the tropical zone, with some species also breeding in temperate Europe and Australia. They are medium to large waders with strong black or yellow-black bills, large yellow eyes and cryptic plumage. Despite being classed as waders, most species have a preference for arid or semi-arid habitats. Two species are found on the islands.

Common name	Binomial	Comments
Great stone-curlew	Esacus recurvirostris	Near-threatened
Beach stone-curlew	Esacus magnirostris	Near-threatened

== Stilts and avocets ==
Order: Charadriiformes Family: Recurvirostridae

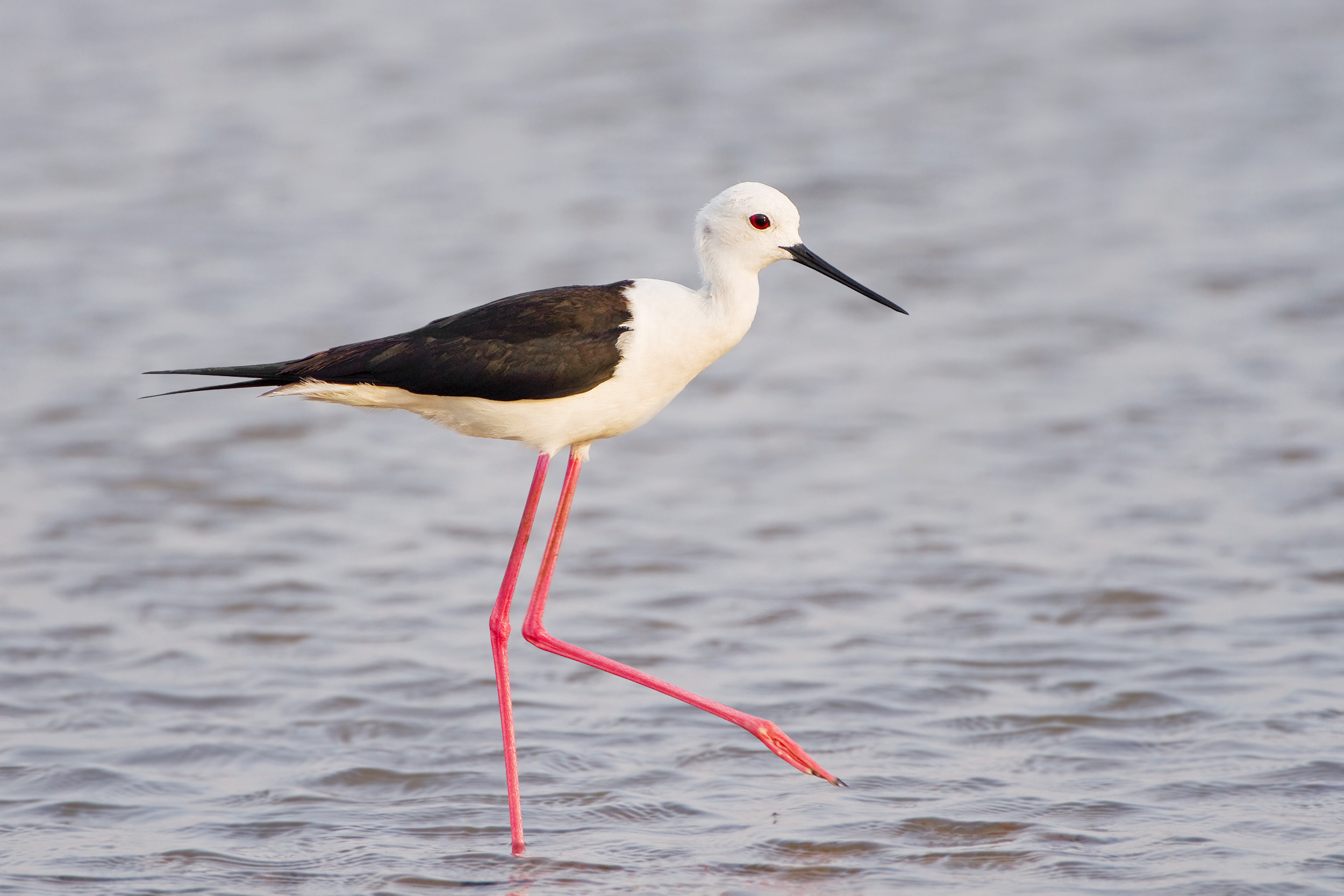
Black-winged stilt

Recurvirostridae is a family of large wading birds, which includes the avocets and stilts. The avocets have long legs and long up-curved bills. The stilts have extremely long legs and long, thin, straight bills. There is one species, the black-winged stilt, which has been recorded on the islands.

Common name	Binomial	Comments
Black-winged stilt	Himantopus himantopus	

== Plovers ==
Order: Charadriiformes Family: Charadriidae

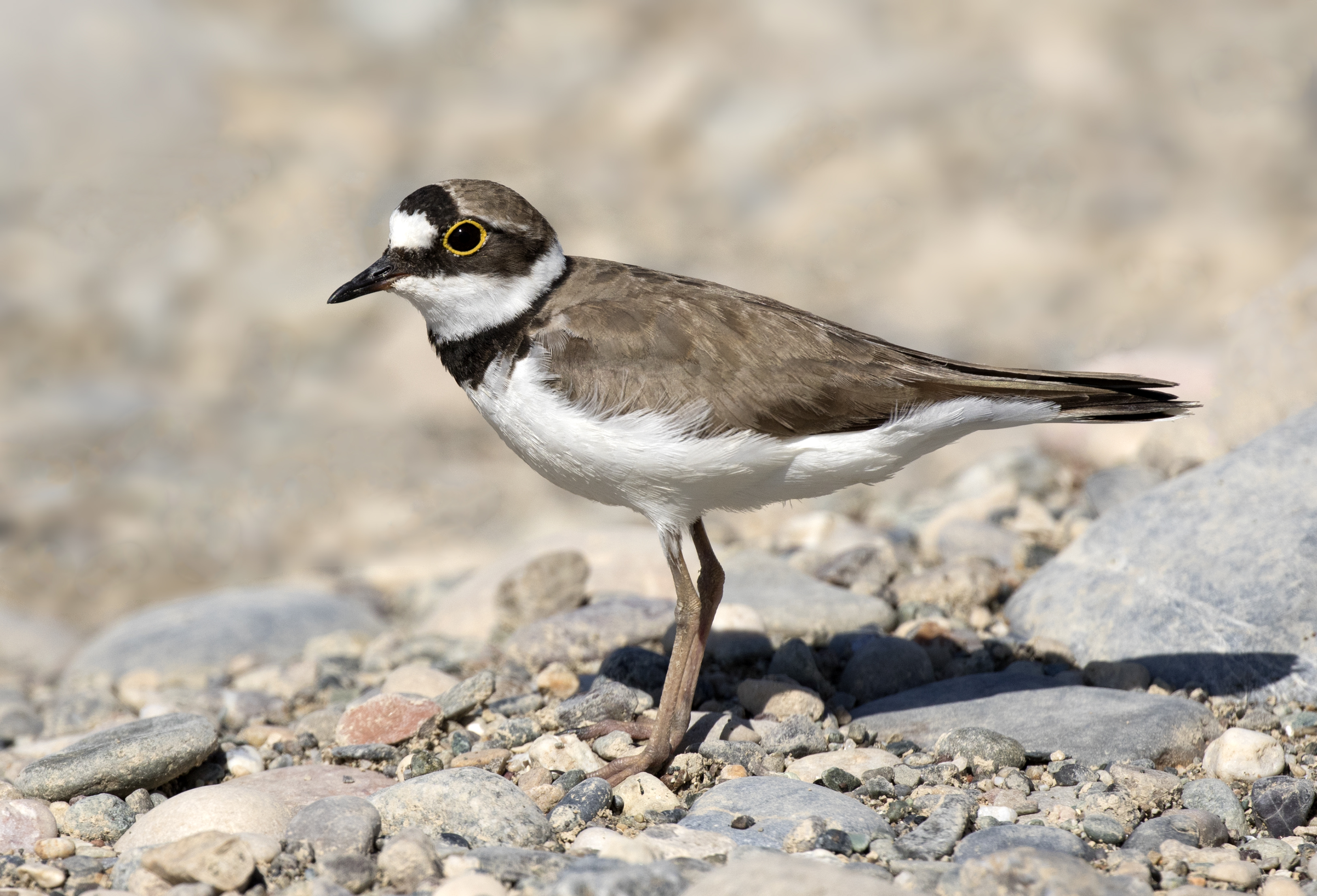
Little ringed plover

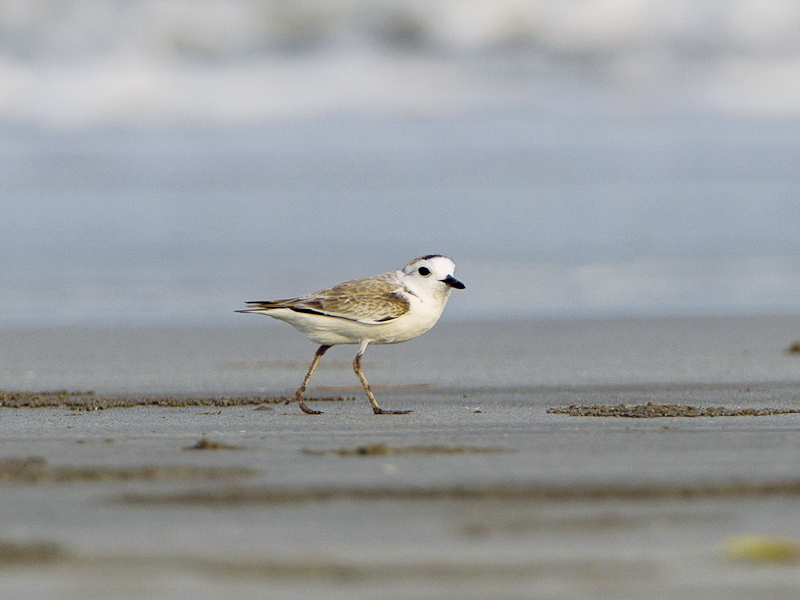
White-faced plover

The family Charadriidae includes the plovers, dotterels and lapwings. They are small to medium-sized birds with compact bodies, short, thick necks and long, usually pointed, wings. They are found in open country worldwide, mostly in habitats near water. There are 13 species which have been recorded on the islands.

Common name	Binomial	Comments
Northern lapwing	Vanellus vanellus	Near-threatened
Grey-headed lapwing	Vanellus cinereus	
European golden plover	Pluvialis apricaria	(A)
Pacific golden plover	Pluvialis fulva	
Grey plover	Pluvialis squatarola	Vulnerable
Common ringed plover	Charadrius hiaticula	(A)
Little ringed plover	Charadrius dubius	
Kentish plover	Charadrius alexandrinus	
White-faced plover	Charadrius dealbatus	(A)
Siberian sand plover	Charadrius mongolus	Endangered
Tibetan sand plover	Charadrius atrifrons	
Greater sand plover	Charadrius leschenaultii	
Oriental plover	Charadrius veredus	(A)

== Painted-snipes ==
Order: Charadriiformes Family: Rostratulidae

Painted-snipes are short-legged, long-billed birds similar in shape to the true snipes, but more brightly coloured. There is one species which occurs on the islands.

Common name	Binomial	Comments
Greater painted-snipe	Rostratula benghalensis	

== Jacanas ==
Order: Charadriiformes Family: Jacanidae

The jacanas are a group of tropical waders in the family Jacanidae. They are found throughout the tropics. They are identifiable by their huge feet and claws which enable them to walk on floating vegetation in the shallow lakes that are their preferred habitat. There is one species which has been recorded on the islands.

Common name	Binomial	Comments
Pheasant-tailed jacana	Hydrophasianus chirurgus	

== Sandpipers and snipes ==
Order: Charadriiformes Family: Scolopacidae

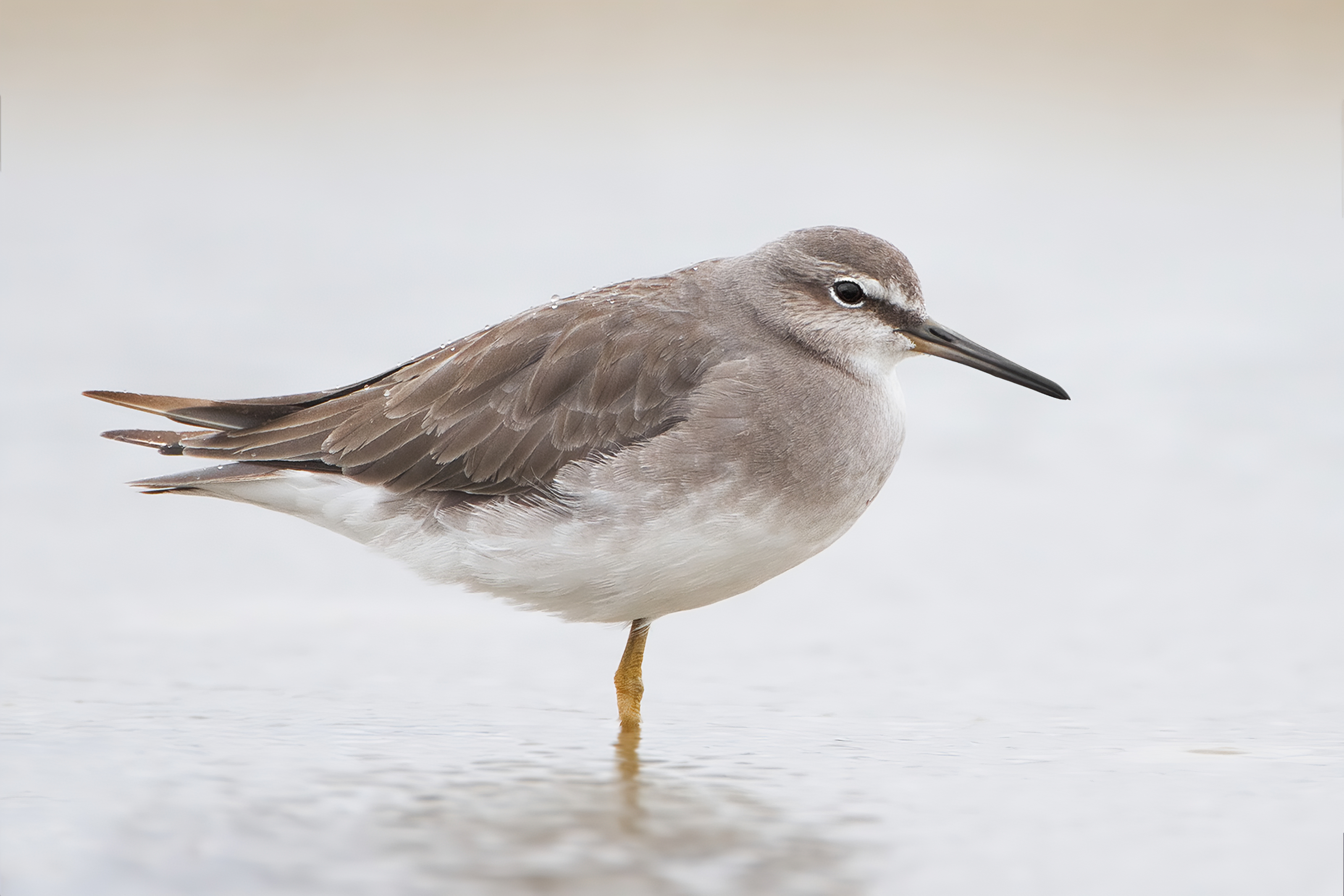
Grey-tailed tattler

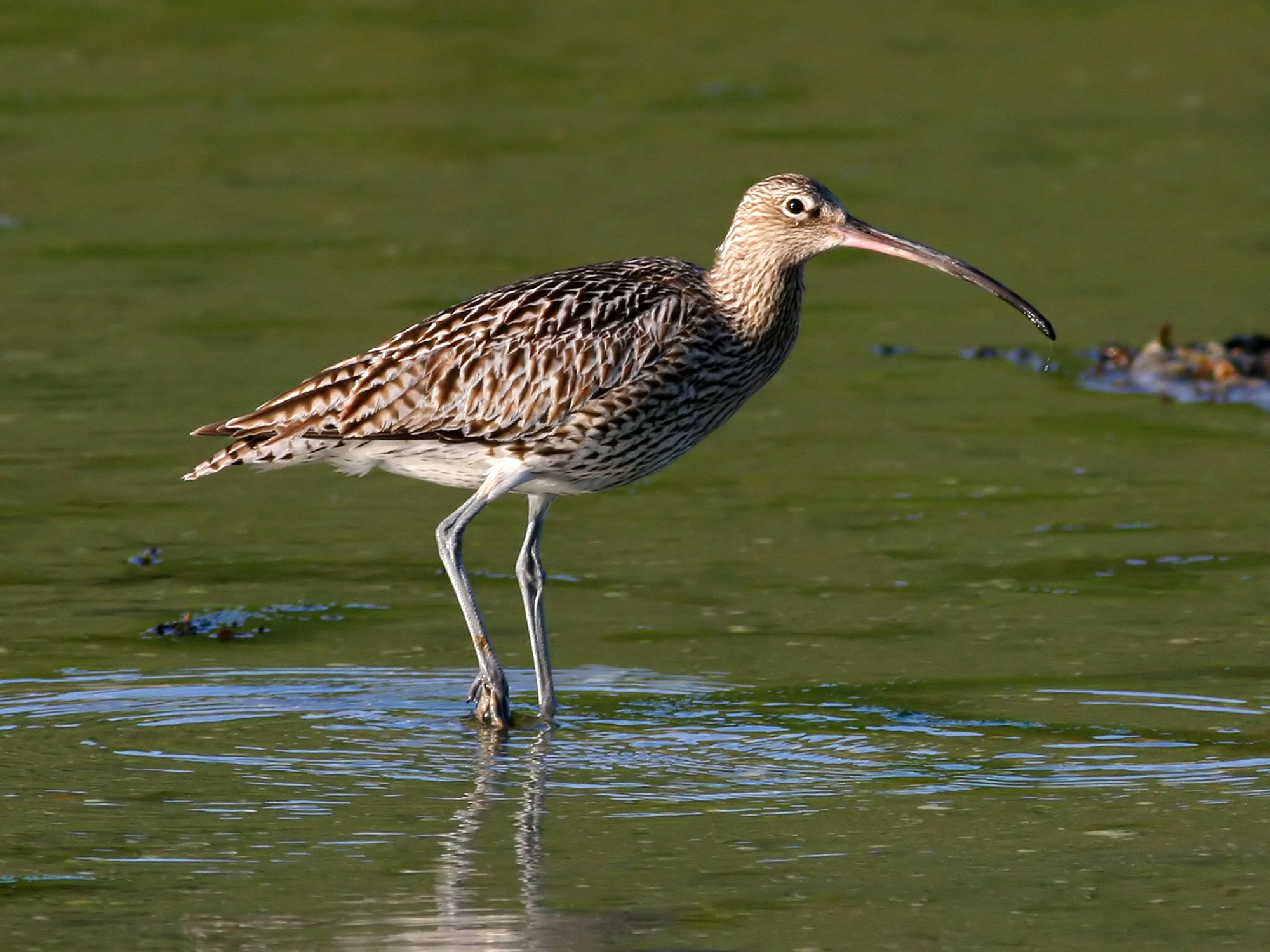
Eurasian curlew

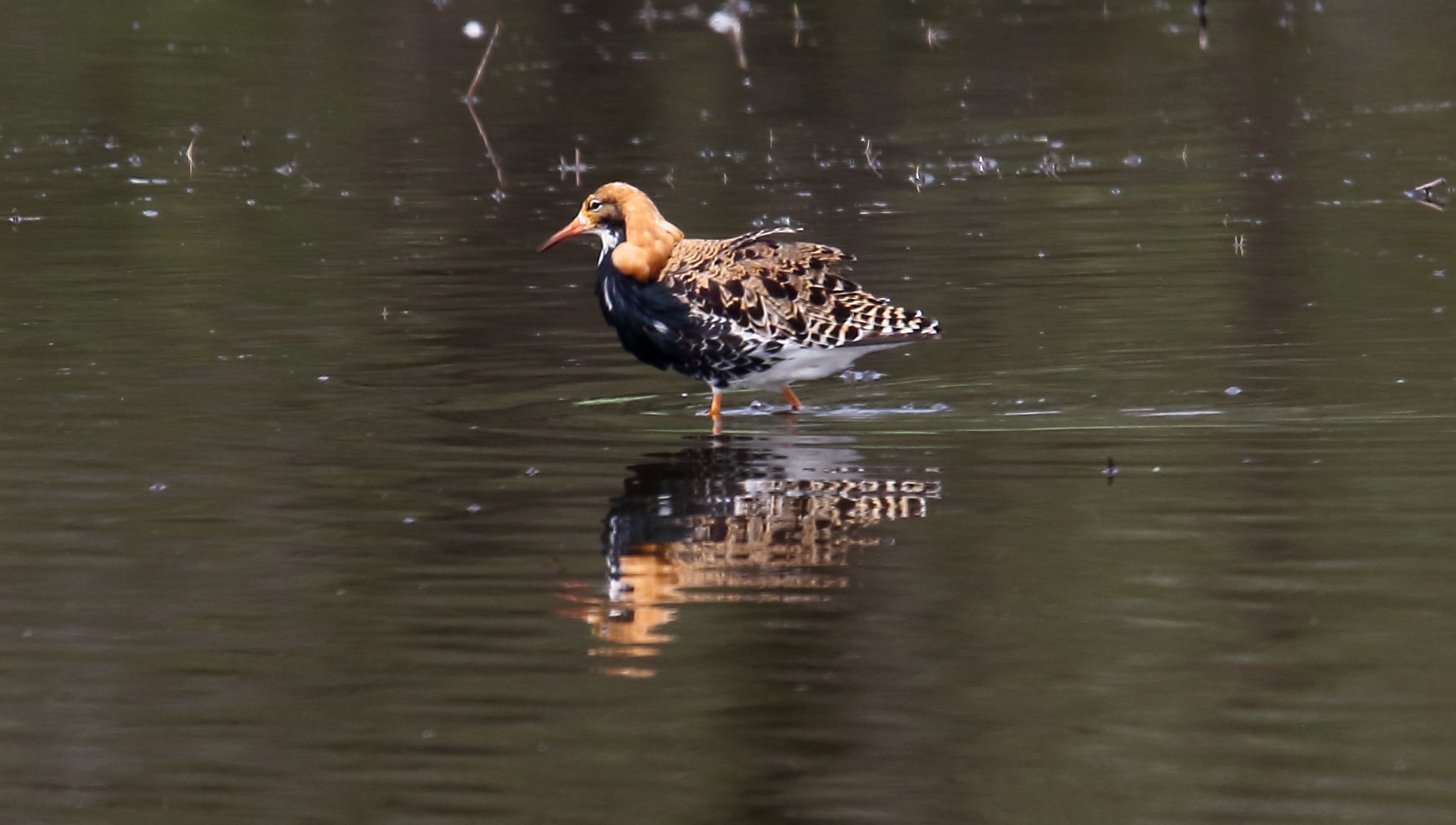
Ruff

Scolopacidae is a large diverse family of small to medium-sized shorebirds including the sandpipers, curlews, godwits, shanks, tattlers, woodcocks, snipes, dowitchers and phalaropes. The majority of these species eat small invertebrates picked out of the mud or soil. Variation in length of legs and bills enables multiple species to feed in the same habitat, particularly on the coast, without direct competition for food.

Common name	Binomial	Comments
Eurasian whimbrel	Numenius phaeopus	
Eurasian curlew	Numenius arquata	Near-threatened
Bar-tailed godwit	Limosa lapponica	Near-threatened
Black-tailed godwit	Limosa limosa	Near-threatened
Ruddy turnstone	Arenaria interpres	Near-threatened
Great knot	Calidris tenuirostris	Endangered
Red knot	Calidris canutus	(A); Near-threatened
Ruff	Calidris pugnax	
Broad-billed sandpiper	Calidris falcinellus	Vulnerable
Curlew sandpiper	Calidris ferruginea	Vulnerable
Temminck's stint	Calidris temminckii	
Long-toed stint	Calidris subminuta	
Red-necked stint	Calidris ruficollis	Near-threatened
Sanderling	Calidris alba	
Little stint	Calidris minuta	
Pectoral sandpiper	Calidris melanotos	(A)
Asian dowitcher	Limnodromus semipalmatus	Near-threatened
Eurasian woodcock	Scolopax rusticola	
Jack snipe	Lymnocryptes minimus	
Wood snipe	Gallinago nemoricola	Vulnerable
Pin-tailed snipe	Gallinago stenura	
Swinhoe's snipe	Gallinago megala	
Great snipe	Gallinago media	Near-threatened
Common snipe	Gallinago gallinago	
Terek sandpiper	Xenus cinereus	
Common sandpiper	Actitis hypoleucos	
Green sandpiper	Tringa ochropus	
Grey-tailed tattler	Tringa brevipes	(A)
Common redshank	Tringa totanus	
Marsh sandpiper	Tringa stagnatilis	
Wood sandpiper	Tringa glareola	
Spotted redshank	Tringa erythropus	
Common greenshank	Tringa nebularia	

== Crab-plover ==
Order: Charadriiformes Family: Dromadidae

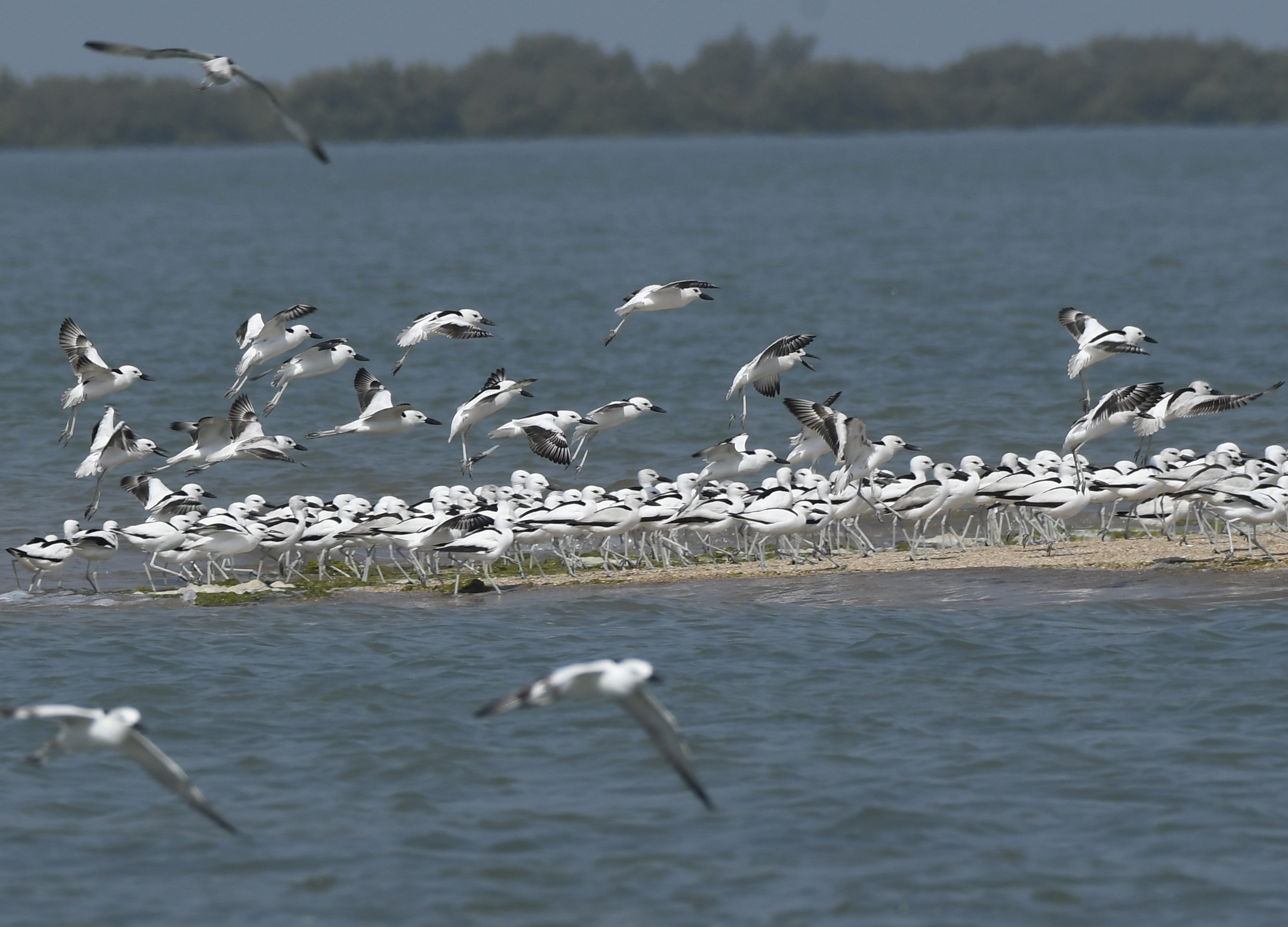
Crab-plover

The crab-plover is related to the waders. It resembles a plover but with very long grey legs and a strong heavy black bill similar to a tern. It has black-and-white plumage, a long neck, partially webbed feet and a bill designed for eating crabs.

Common name	Binomial	Comments
Crab-plover	Dromas ardeola	(A)

== Coursers and pratincoles ==
Order: Charadriiformes Family: Glareolidae

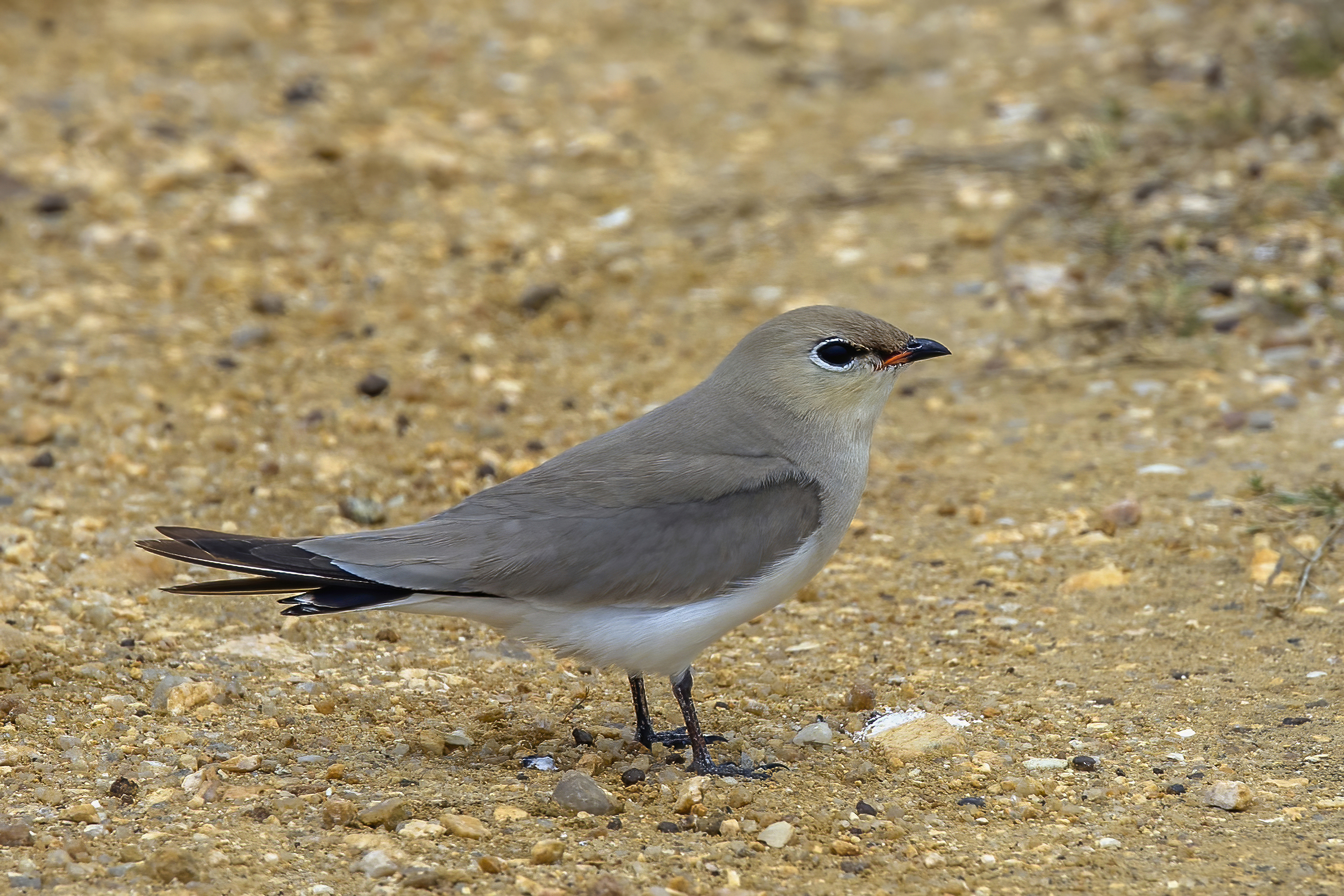
Small pratincole

Glareolidae is a family of wading birds comprising the pratincoles, which have short legs, long pointed wings and long forked tails, and the coursers, which have long legs, short wings and long, pointed bills which curve downwards. There are three species which have been recorded on the islands.

Common name	Binomial	Comments
Collared pratincole	Glareola pratincola	(A)
Oriental pratincole	Glareola maldivarum	
Small pratincole	Glareola lactea	

== Gulls, terns, and skimmers ==
Order: Charadriiformes Family: Laridae

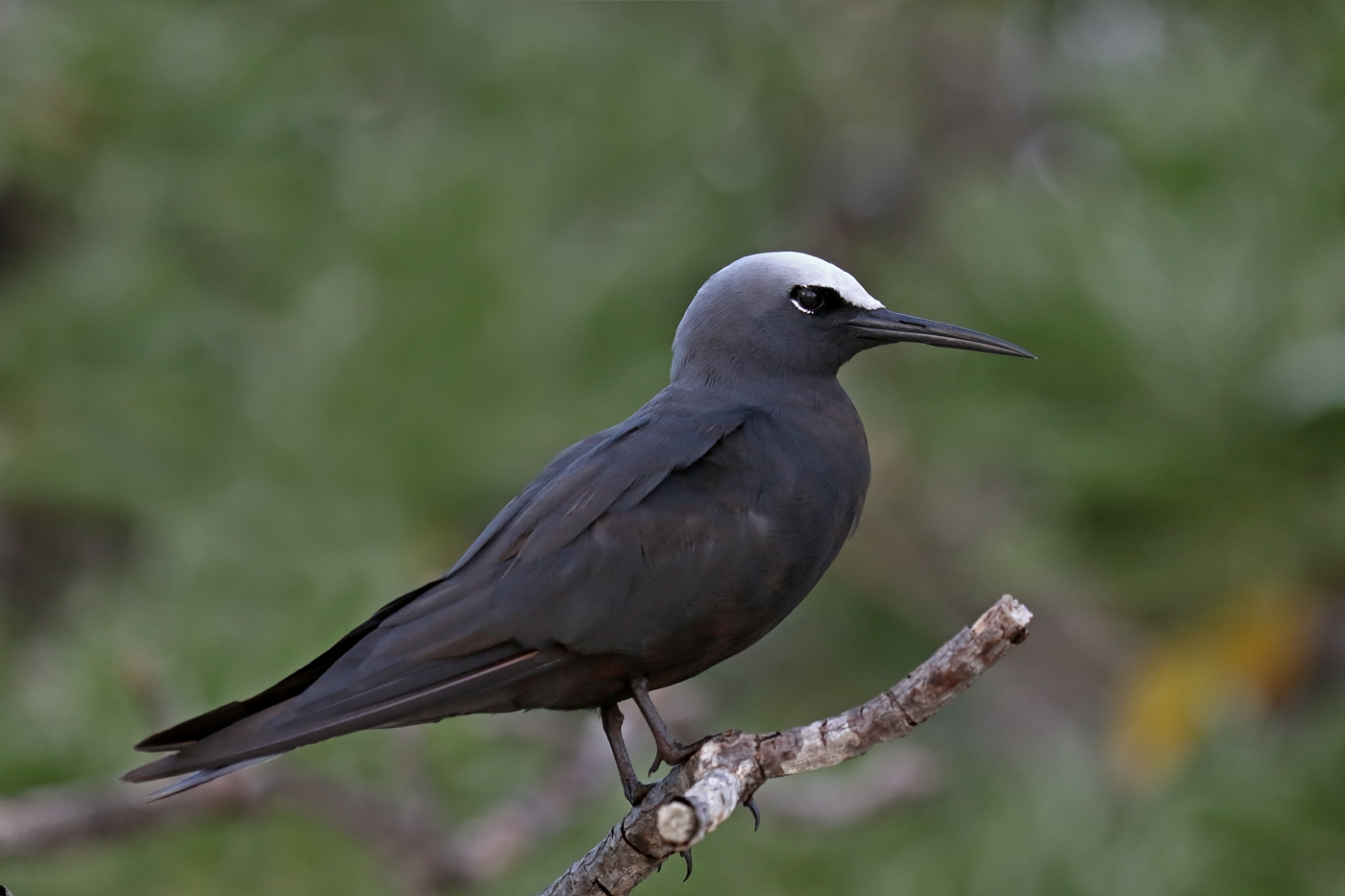
Black noddy

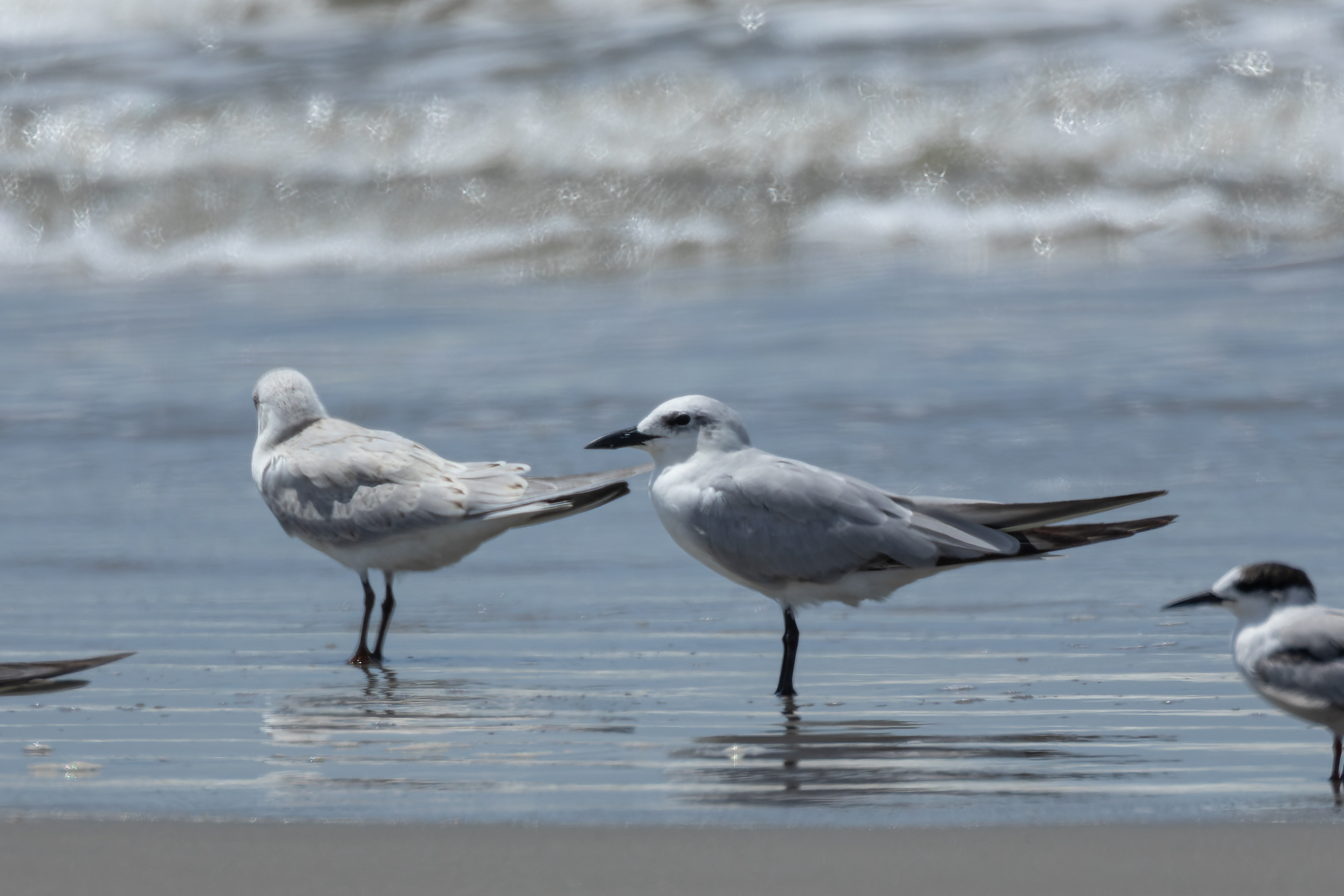
Gull-billed tern

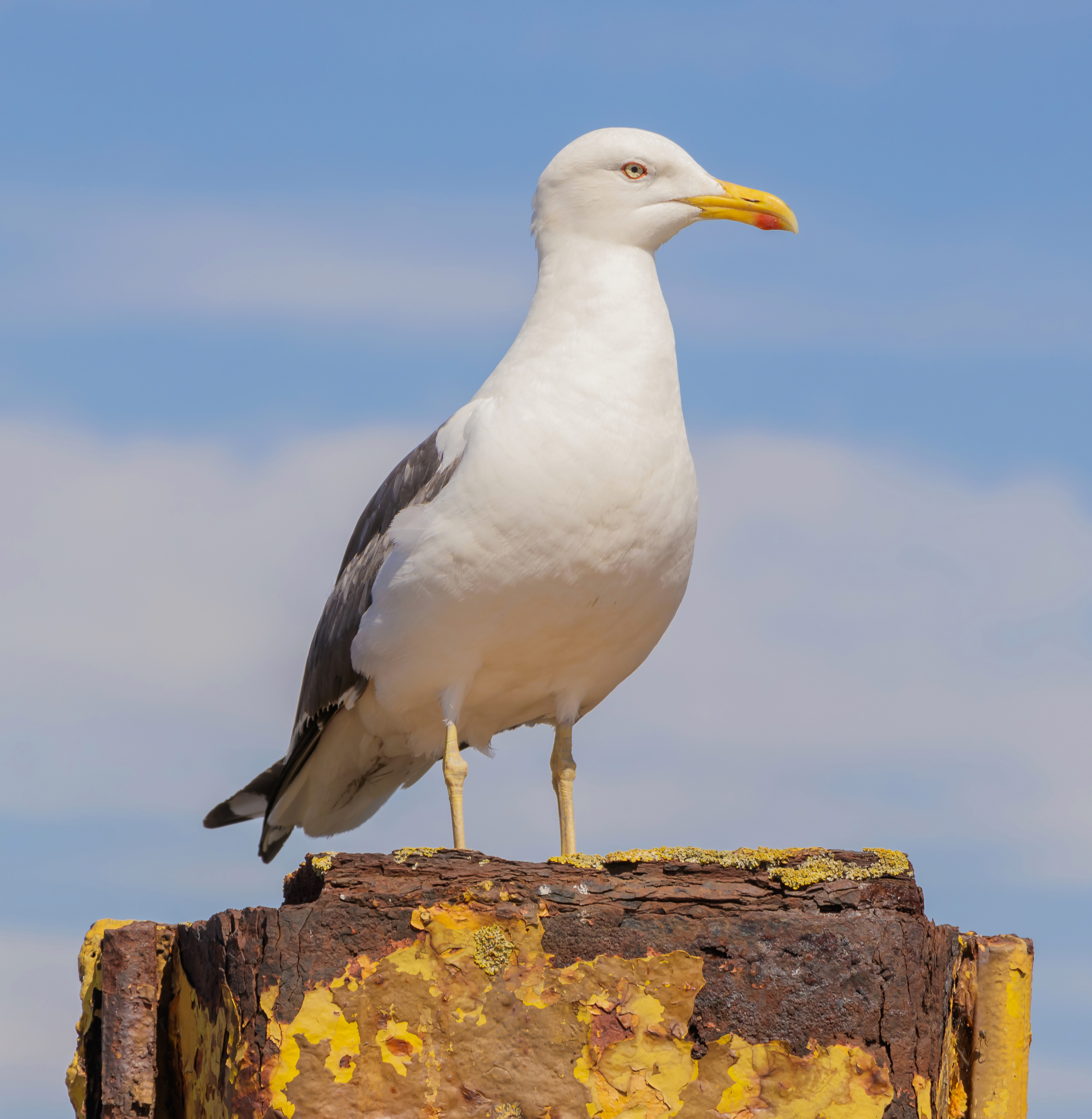
Lesser black-backed gull

Laridae is a family of medium to large seabirds, the gulls, terns, and skimmers. Gulls are typically grey or white, often with black markings on the head or wings. They have stout, longish bills and webbed feet. Terns are a group of generally medium to large seabirds typically with grey or white plumage, often with black markings on the head. Most terns hunt fish by diving but some pick insects off the surface of fresh water. Gulls and terns are generally long-lived birds, with several species known to live in excess of 30 years. Skimmers are a small family of tropical tern-like birds. They have an elongated lower mandible which they use to feed by flying low over the water surface and skimming the water for small fish.

Common name	Binomial	Comments
Brown noddy	Anous stolidus	
Lesser noddy	Anous tenuirostris	(A)
Black noddy	Anous minutus	
White tern	Gygis alba	(A)
Brown-headed gull	Chroicocephalus brunnicephalus	
Black-headed gull	Chroicocephalus ridibundus	
Lesser black-backed gull	Larus fuscus	
Gull-billed tern	Gelochelidon nilotica	
Greater crested tern	Thalasseus bergii	
Lesser crested tern	Thalasseus bengalensis	
Little tern	Sternula albifrons	
Bridled tern	Onychoprion anaethetus	(A)
Sooty tern	Onychoprion fuscatus	(A)
Roseate tern	Sterna dougallii	
Black-naped tern	Sterna sumatrana	
Common tern	Sterna hirundo	
Whiskered tern	Chlidonias hybrida	
White-winged tern	Chlidonias leucopterus	

== Skuas ==
Order: Charadriiformes Family: Stercorariidae

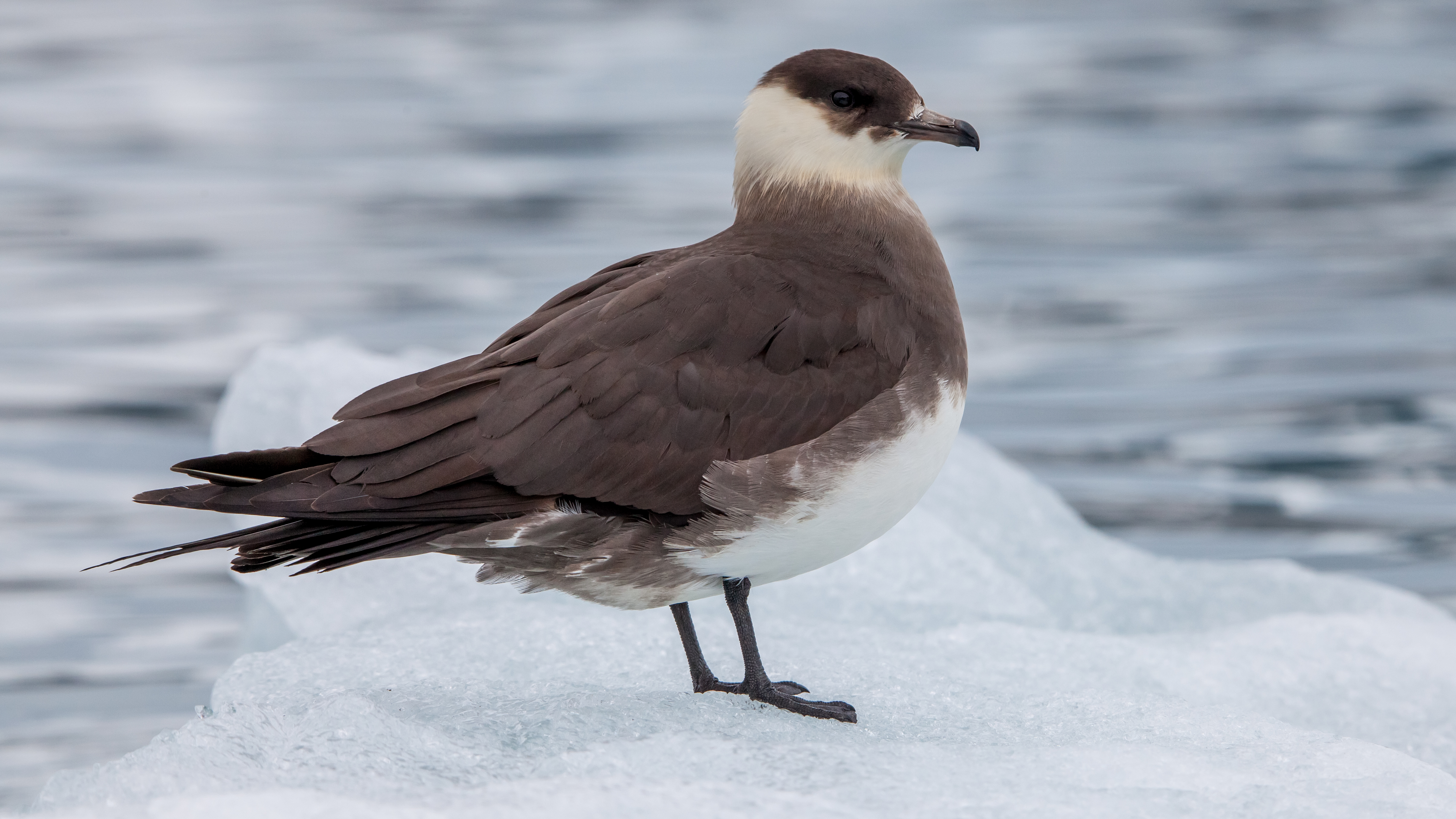
Parasitic jaeger

The family Stercorariidae are, in general, medium to large birds, typically with grey or brown plumage, often with white markings on the wings. They nest on the ground in temperate and arctic regions and are long-distance migrants. There are two species which have been recorded on the islands.

Common name	Binomial	Comments
Pomarine skua	Stercorarius pomarinus	
Arctic skua	Stercorarius parasiticus	

== Tropicbirds ==
Order: Phaethontiformes Family: Phaethontidae

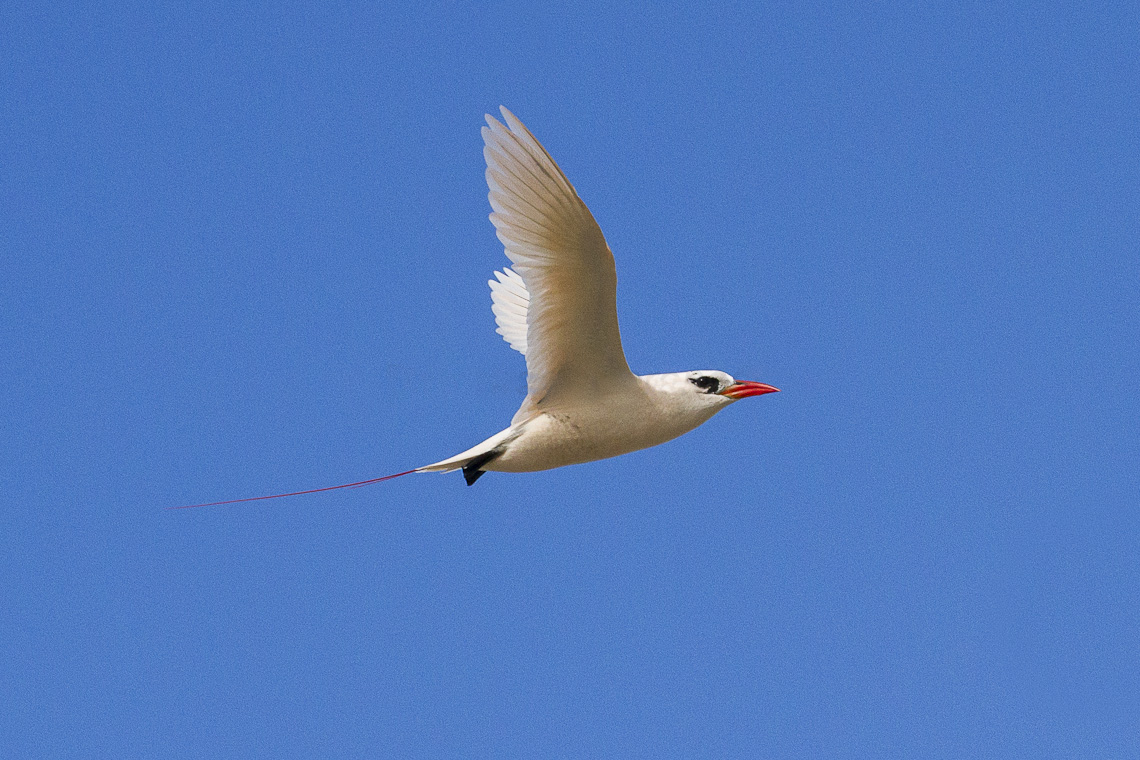
Red-tailed tropicbird

Tropicbirds are slender white birds of tropical oceans, with exceptionally long central tail feathers. Their heads and long wings have black markings.

Common name	Binomial	Comments
Red-billed tropicbird	Phaethon aethereus	
Red-tailed tropicbird	Phaethon rubricauda	(A)
White-tailed tropicbird	Phaethon lepturus	(A)

== Austral storm petrels ==
Order: Procellariiformes Family: Oceanitidae

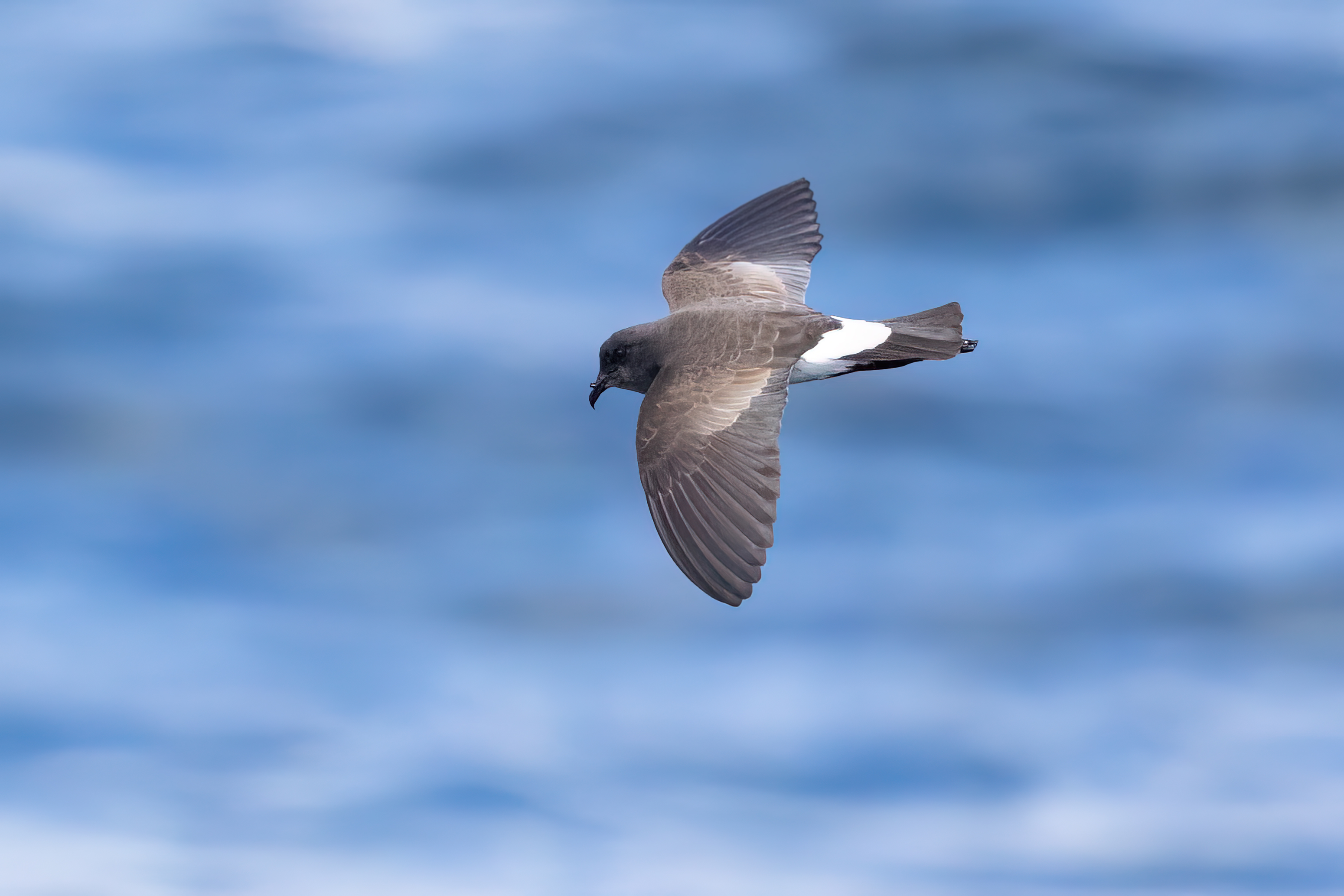
Black-bellied storm petrel

The southern storm petrels include some of the smallest seabirds. They feed on planktonic crustaceans and small fish picked from the surface, typically while hovering. The flight is fluttering and sometimes bat-like.

Common name	Binomial	Comments
Wilson's storm petrel	Oceanites oceanicus	(A)
White-faced storm petrel	Pelagodroma marina	(A)
White-bellied storm petrel	Fregetta grallaria	(A)
Black-bellied storm petrel	Fregetta tropica	(A)

== Northern storm petrels ==
Order: Procellariiformes Family: Hydrobatidae

The northern storm petrels include some of the smallest seabirds. They feed on planktonic crustaceans and small fish picked from the surface, typically while hovering. The flight is fluttering and sometimes bat-like.

Common name	Binomial	Comments
Swinhoe's storm petrel	Hydrobates monorhis	Near-threatened

== Petrels, shearwaters, and diving petrels ==
Order: Procellariiformes Family: Procellariidae

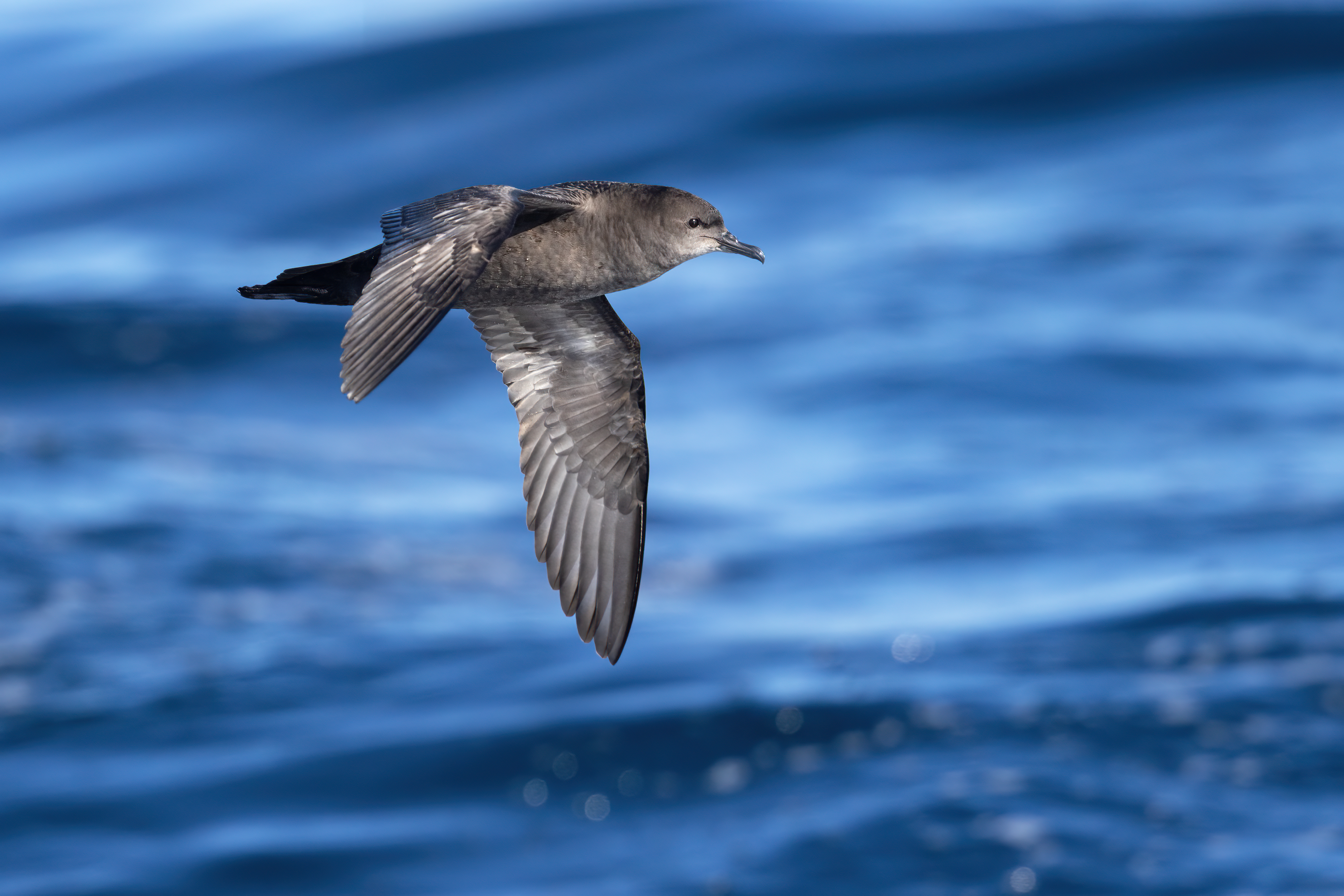
Short-tailed shearwater

The procellariids are the main group of medium-sized shearwaters and petrels, characterised by united nostrils with medium septum and a long outer functional primary. There are 4 species which have been recorded on the islands.

Common name	Binomial	Comments
Streaked shearwater	Calonectris leucomelas	Near-threatened
Wedge-tailed shearwater	Ardenna pacifica	(A)
Short-tailed shearwater	Ardenna tenuirostris	(A)
Flesh-footed shearwater	Ardenna carneipes	Near-threatened

== Storks ==
Order: Ciconiiformes Family: Ciconiidae

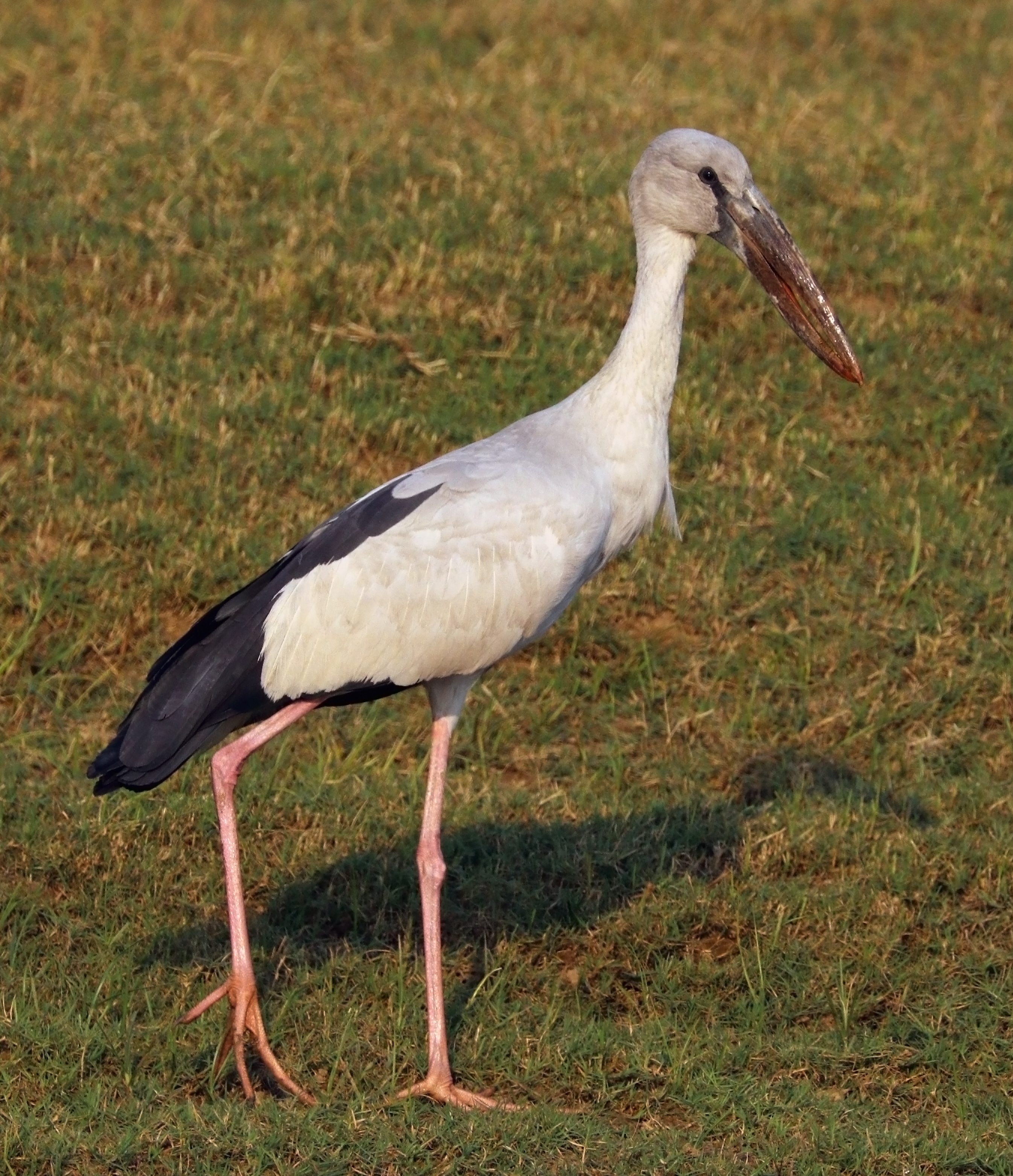
Asian openbill

Storks are large, long-legged, long-necked, wading birds with long, stout bills. Storks are mute, but bill-clattering is an important mode of communication at the nest. Their nests can be large and may be reused for many years. Many species are migratory.

Common name	Binomial	Comments
Asian openbill	Anastomus oscitans	Extinct on the islands

== Frigatebirds ==
Order: Suliformes Family: Fregatidae

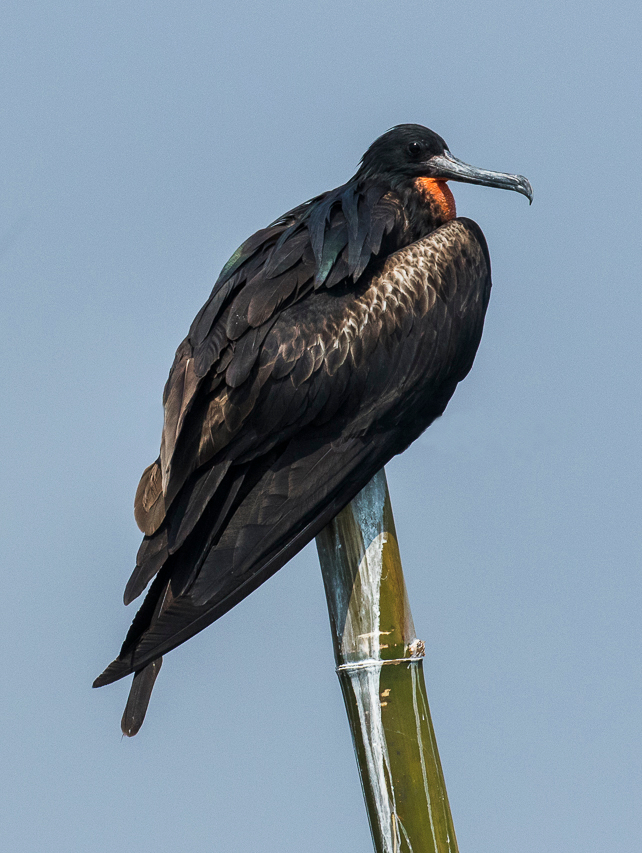
Christmas frigatebird

Frigatebirds are large seabirds usually found over tropical oceans. They are large, black-and-white or completely black, with long wings and deeply forked tails. The males have red inflatable throat pouches. They do not swim or walk and cannot take off from a flat surface. Having the largest wingspan-to-body-weight ratio of any bird, they are essentially aerial, able to stay aloft for more than a week.

Common name	Binomial	Comments
Christmas frigatebird	Fregata andrewsi	(A) Vulnerable
Great frigatebird	Fregata minor	(A)
Lesser frigatebird	Fregata ariel	

== Gannets and boobies ==
Order: Suliformes Family: Sulidae

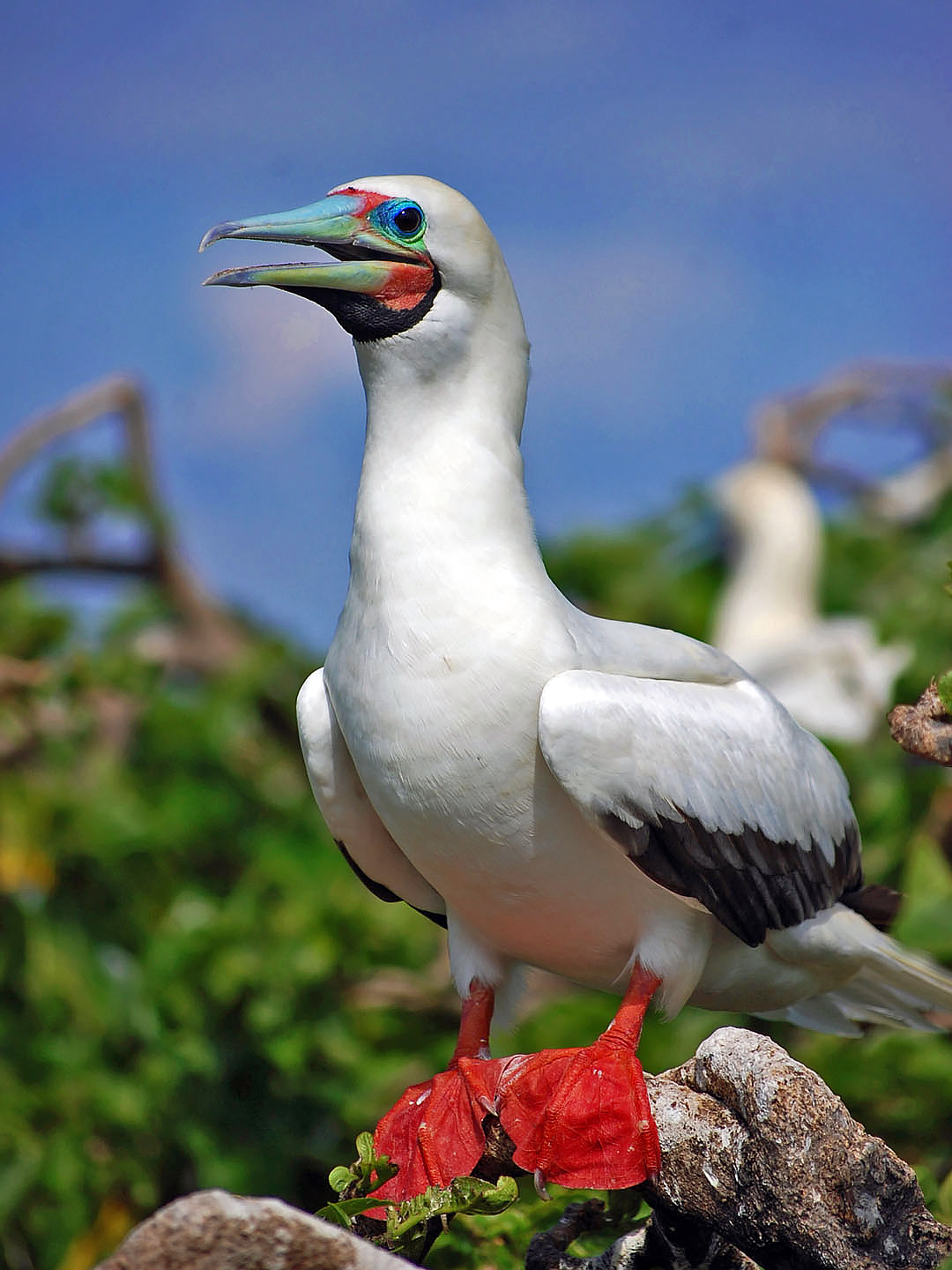
Red-footed booby

The sulids comprise the gannets and boobies. Both groups are medium to large coastal seabirds that plunge-dive for fish.

Common name	Binomial	Comments
Masked booby	Sula dactylatra	(A)
Red-footed booby	Sula sula	(A)

== Anhingas and darters ==
Order: Suliformes Family: Anhingidae

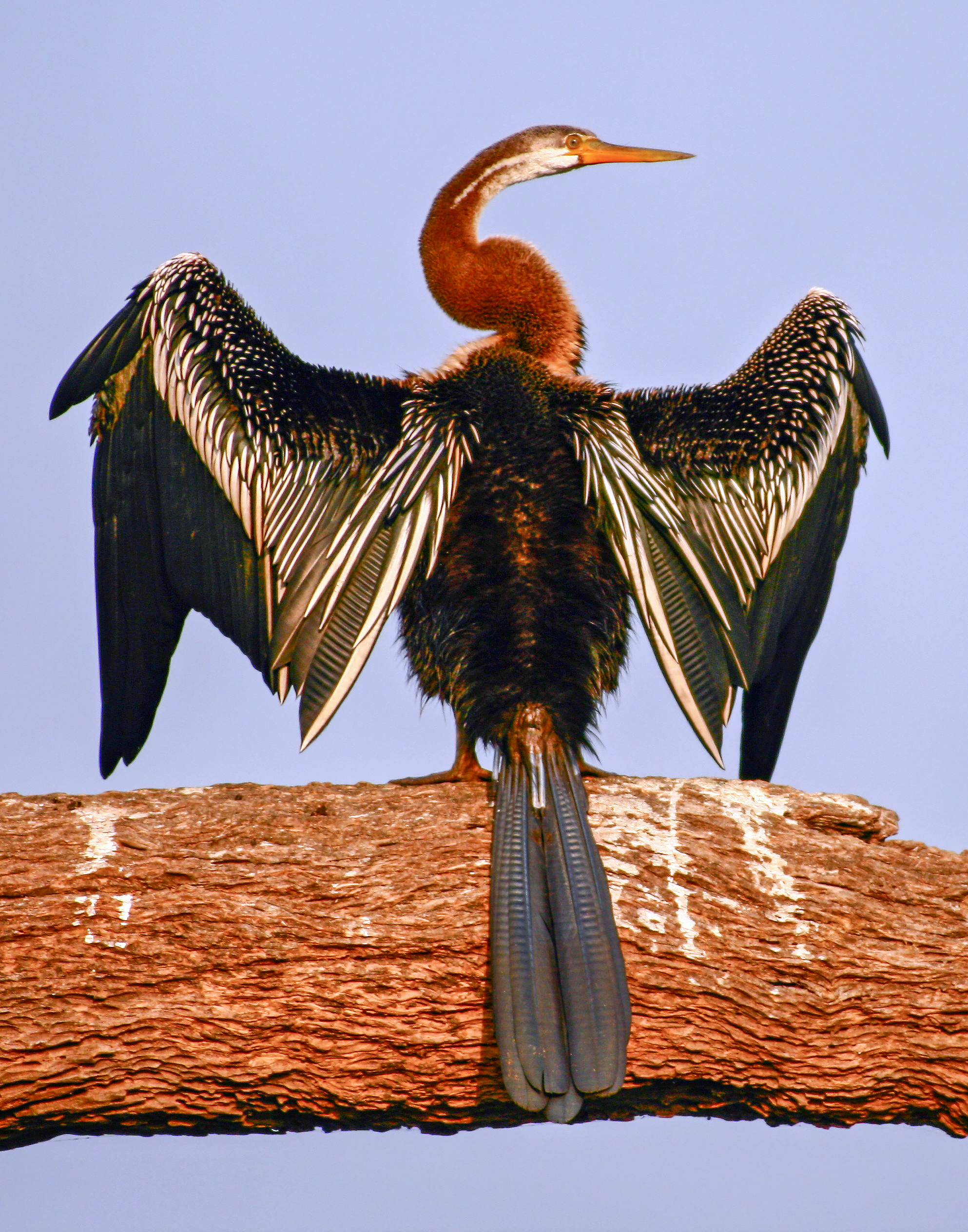
Oriental darter

Darters are often called "snake-birds" because of their long thin neck, which gives a snake-like appearance when they swim with their bodies submerged. The males have black and dark-brown plumage, an erectile crest on the nape and a larger bill than the female. The females have much paler plumage especially on the neck and underparts. The darters have completely webbed feet and their legs are short and set far back on the body. Their plumage is somewhat permeable, like that of cormorants, and they spread their wings to dry after diving.

Common name	Binomial	Comments
Oriental darter	Anhinga melanogaster	

== Cormorants and shags ==
Order: Suliformes Family: Phalacrocoracidae

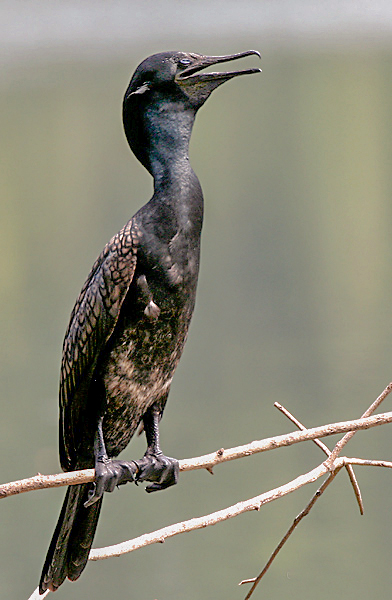
Indian cormorant

Phalacrocoracidae is a family of medium to large coastal, fish-eating seabirds that includes cormorants and shags. Plumage colouration varies, with the majority having mainly dark plumage, some species being black-and-white; many have brightly coloured eyes and throat pouches.

Common name	Binomial	Comments
Little cormorant	Microcarbo niger	
Indian cormorant	Phalacrocorax fuscicollis	

== Ibises and spoonbills ==
Order: Pelecaniformes Family: Threskiornithidae

Threskiornithidae is a family of large terrestrial and wading birds which includes the ibises and spoonbills. They have long, broad wings with 11 primary and about 20 secondary feathers. They are strong fliers and despite their size and weight, very capable soarers.

Common name	Binomial	Comments
Glossy ibis	Plegadis falcinellus	(A)

== Herons and bitterns ==
Order: Pelecaniformes Family: Ardeidae

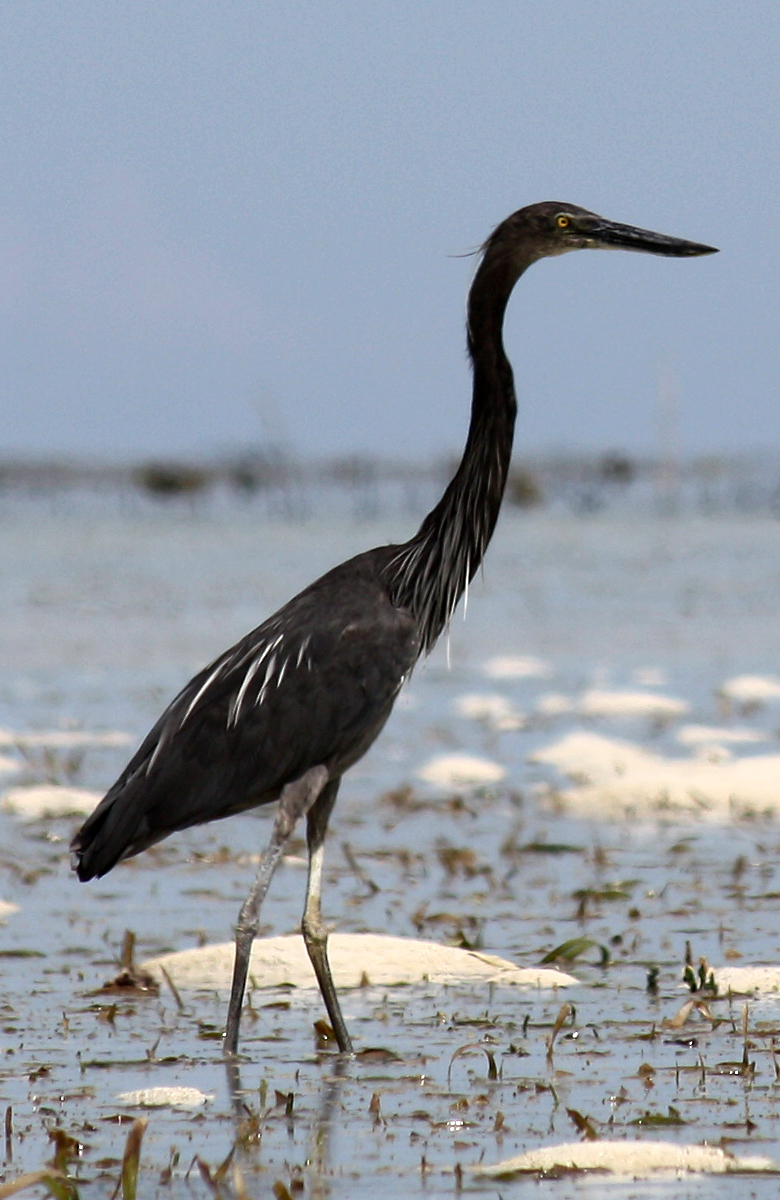
Great-billed heron

The family Ardeidae contains the bitterns, herons and egrets. Herons and egrets are medium to large wading birds with long necks and legs. Bitterns tend to be shorter necked and more wary. Members of Ardeidae fly with their necks retracted, unlike other long-necked birds such as storks, ibises and spoonbills.

Common name	Binomial	Comments
Yellow bittern	Ixobrychus sinensis	
Cinnamon bittern	Ixobrychus cinnamomeus	
Black bittern	Ixobrychus flavicollis	
Malayan night heron	Gorsachius melanolophus	
Black-crowned night heron	Nycticorax nycticorax	
Striated heron	Butorides striata	
Indian pond heron	Ardeola grayii	
Chinese pond heron	Ardeola bacchus	
Javan pond heron	Ardeola speciosa	(A)
Eastern cattle egret	Bubulcus coromandus	
Grey heron	Ardea cinerea	
Purple heron	Ardea purpurea	
Great-billed heron	Ardea sumatrana	(A)
Great egret	Ardea alba	
Medium egret	Ardea intermedia	
Little egret	Egretta garzetta	
Pacific reef heron	Egretta sacra	
Chinese egret	Egretta eulophotes	(A) Vulnerable

== Pelicans ==
Order: Pelecaniformes Family: Pelecanidae

Pelicans are large water birds with a distinctive pouch under their beak. As with other members of the order Pelecaniformes, they have webbed feet with four toes. There is one species which is found on the islands.

Common name	Binomial	Comments
Spot-billed pelican	Pelecanus philippensis	Near threatened

== Osprey ==
Order: Accipitriformes Family: Pandionidae

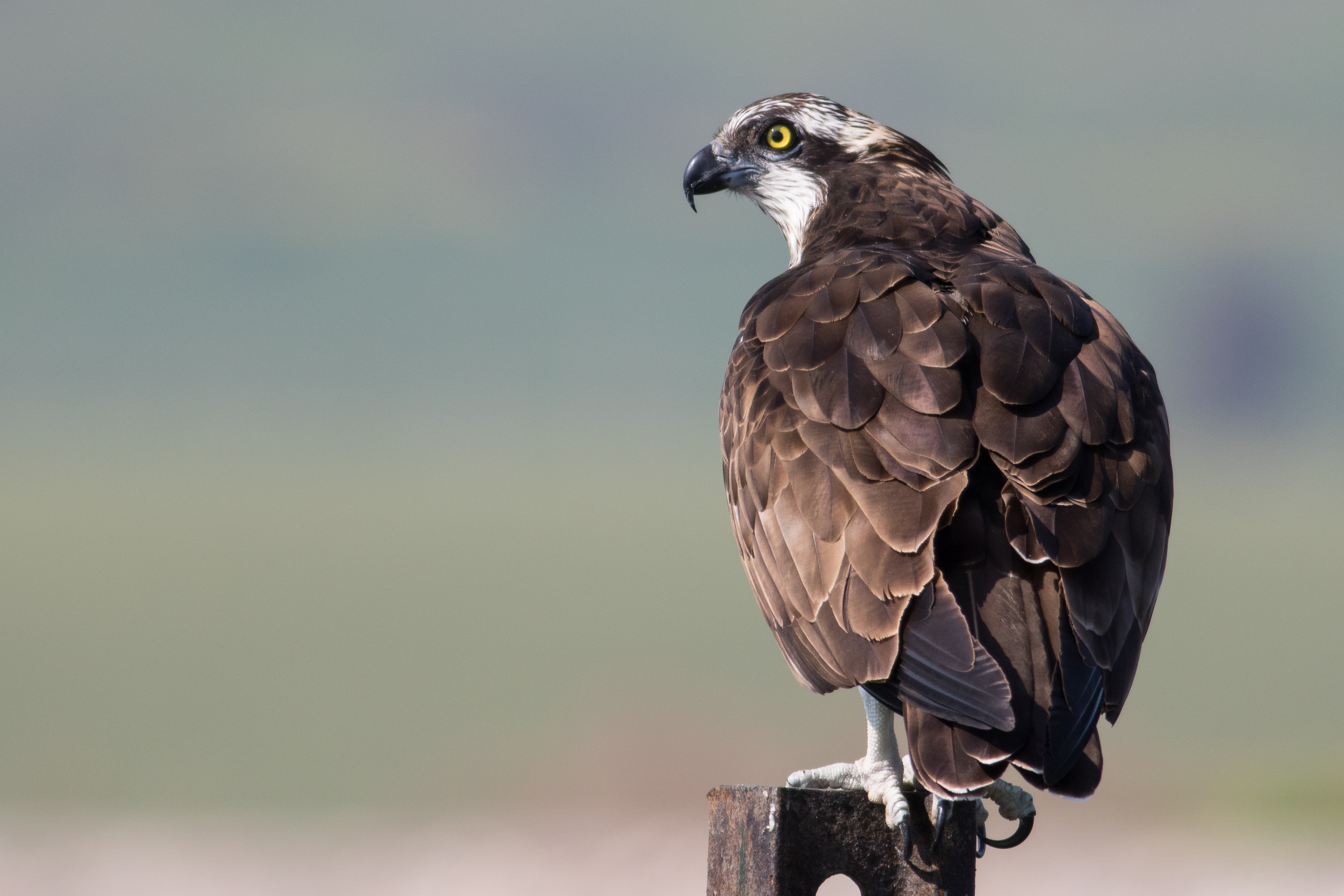
Osprey

The family Pandionidae contains usually only one species, the osprey. The osprey is a medium-large raptor which is a specialist fish-eater with most taxonomic authorities consider a worldwide distribution.

Common name	Binomial	Comments
Osprey	Pandion haliaetus	

== Kites, hawks, and eagles ==
Order: Accipitriformes Family: Accipitridae

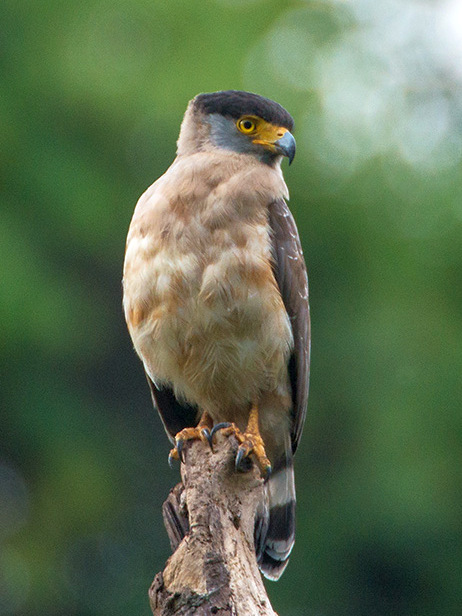
Great Nicobar serpent eagle

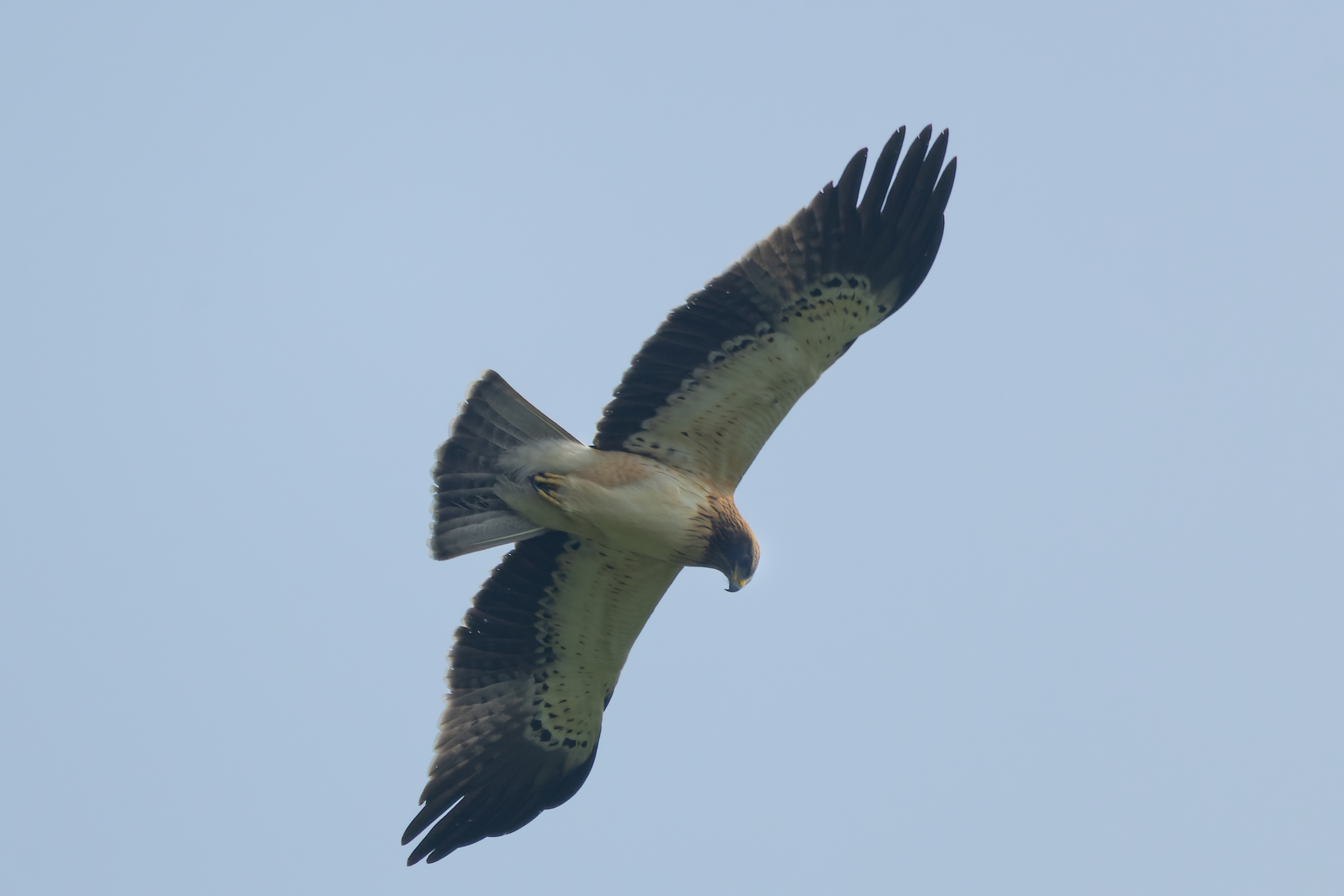
Booted eagle

Accipitridae is a family of birds of prey, which includes hawks, eagles, kites, harriers and Old World vultures. These birds have powerful hooked beaks for tearing flesh from their prey, strong legs, powerful talons and keen eyesight.

Common name	Binomial	Comments
Black-winged kite	Elanus caeruleus	
Crested honey buzzard	Pernis ptilorhynchus	(A)
Jerdon's baza	Aviceda jerdoni	(A)
Black baza	Aviceda leuphotes	
Crested serpent eagle	Spilornis cheela	
Great Nicobar serpent eagle	Spilornis klossi	(E) Endangered
Andaman serpent eagle	Spilornis elgini	(E) Vulnerable
Changeable hawk-eagle	Nisaetus cirrhatus	
Black eagle	Ictinaetus malaiensis	(A)
Booted eagle	Hieraaetus pennatus	(A)
Shikra	Tachyspiza badia	(A)
Nicobar sparrowhawk	Tachyspiza butleri	(E) Vulnerable
Chinese sparrowhawk	Tachyspiza soloensis	
Besra	Tachyspiza virgata	
Eurasian sparrowhawk	Accipiter nisus	(A)
Western marsh harrier	Circus aeruginosus	
Eastern marsh harrier	Circus spilonotus	(A)
Pallid harrier	Circus macrourus	Near-threatened
Pied harrier	Circus melanoleucos	(A)
Montagu's harrier	Circus pygargus	(A)
Black kite	Milvus migrans	
Brahminy kite	Haliastur indus	
White-bellied sea eagle	Icthyophaga leucogaster	
Grey-faced buzzard	Butastur indicus	
Long-legged buzzard	Buteo rufinus	(A)
Common buzzard	Buteo buteo	

== Barn owls ==
Order: Strigiformes Family: Tytonidae

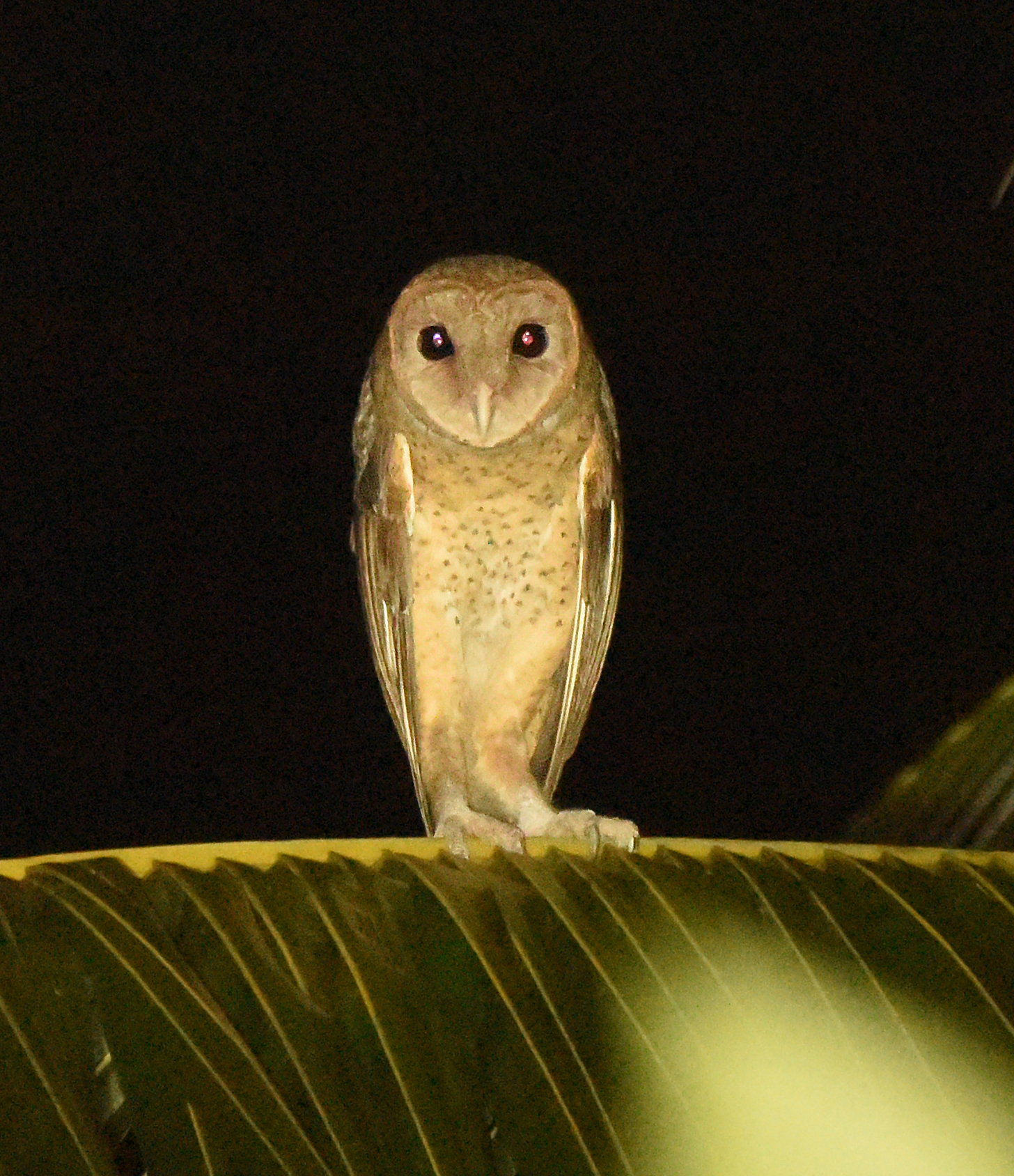
Andaman masked owl

Barn owls are medium to large owls with large heads and characteristic heart-shaped faces. They have long strong legs with powerful talons.

Common name	Binomial	Comments
Eastern barn owl	Tyto javanica	
Andaman masked owl	Tyto deroepstorffi	(E)

== Owls ==
Order: Strigiformes Family: Strigidae

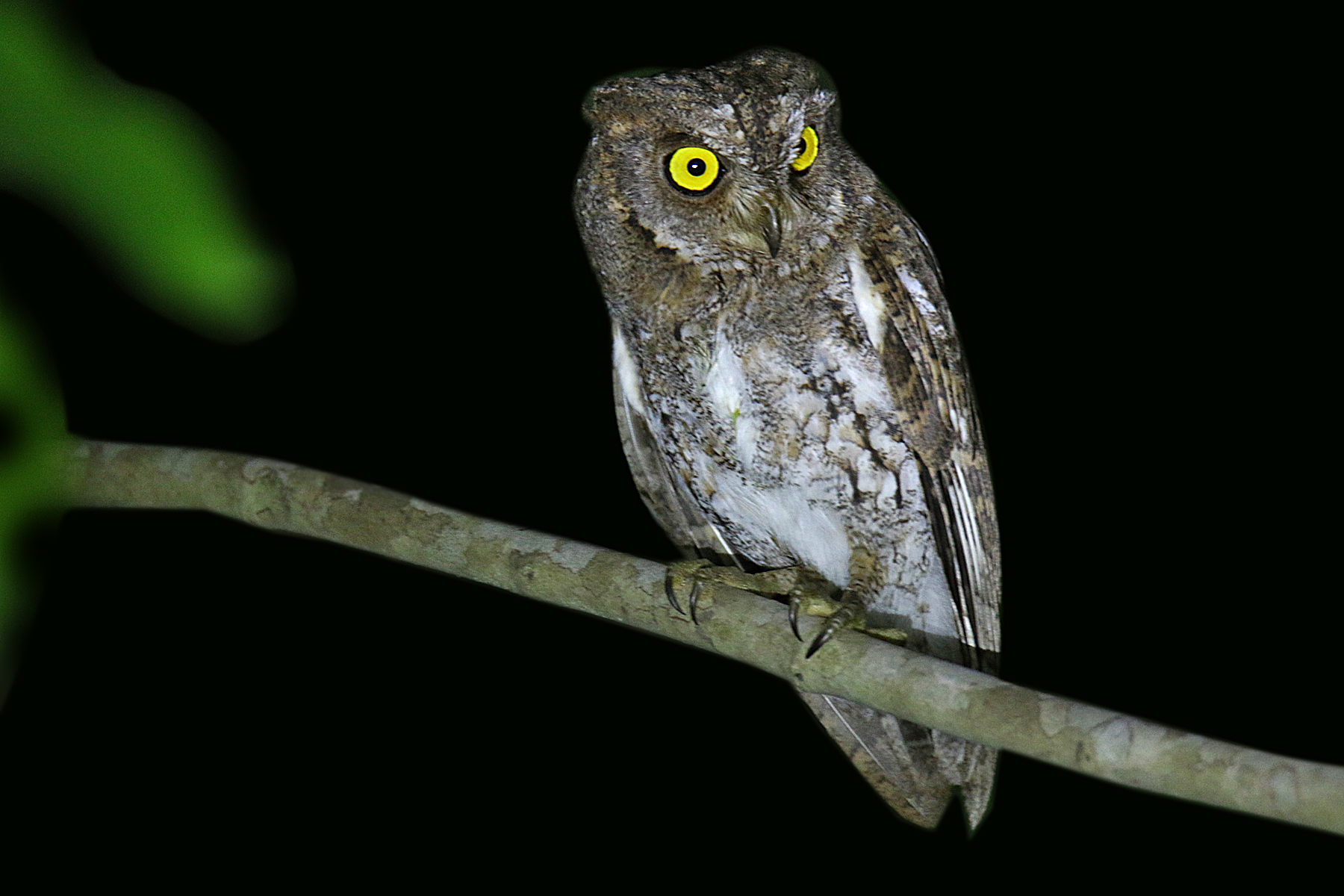
Oriental scops owl

The typical owls are small to large solitary nocturnal birds of prey. They have large forward-facing eyes and ears, a hawk-like beak and a conspicuous circle of feathers around each eye called a facial disk.

Common name	Binomial	Comments
Brown boobook	Ninox scutulata	
Hume's boobook	Ninox obscura	(E)
Andaman boobook	Ninox affinis	(E)
Andaman scops owl	Otus balli	(E)
Oriental scops owl	Otus sunia	
Nicobar scops owl	Otus alius	(E) Near-threatened

== Hoopoes ==
Order: Bucerotiformes Family: Upupidae

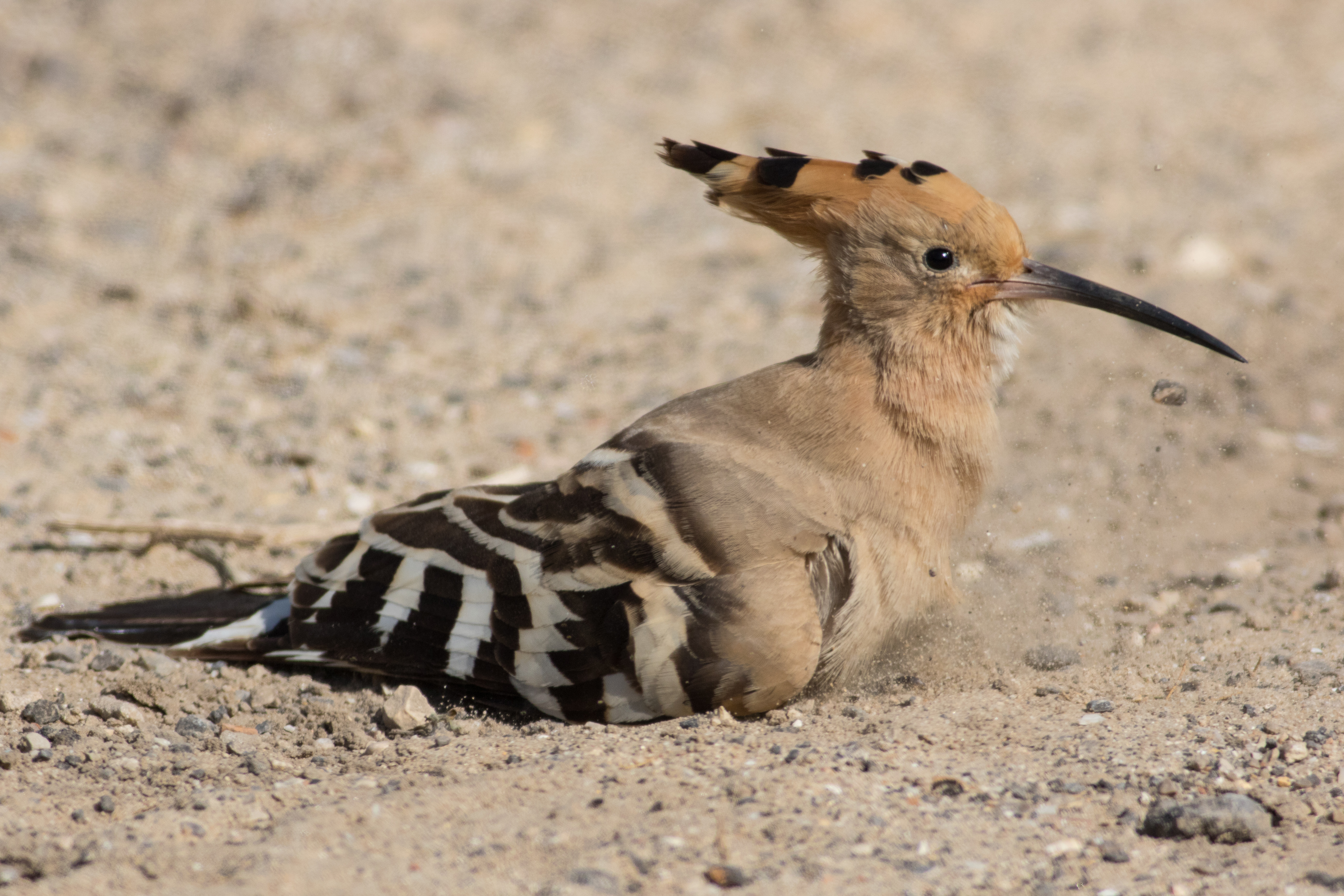
Eurasian hoopoe

Hoopoes have black, white and orangey-pink colouring with a large erectile crest on their head. There is one species which occurs on the islands.

Common name	Binomial	Comments
Eurasian hoopoe	Upupa epops	

== Hornbills ==
Order: Bucerotiformes Family: Bucerotidae

Hornbills are a group of birds whose bill is shaped like a cow's horn, but without a twist, sometimes with a casque on the upper mandible. Frequently, the bill is brightly coloured.

Common name	Binomial	Comments
Narcondam hornbill	Rhyticeros narcondami	(E); Vulnerable

== Rollers ==
Order: Coraciiformes Family: Coraciidae

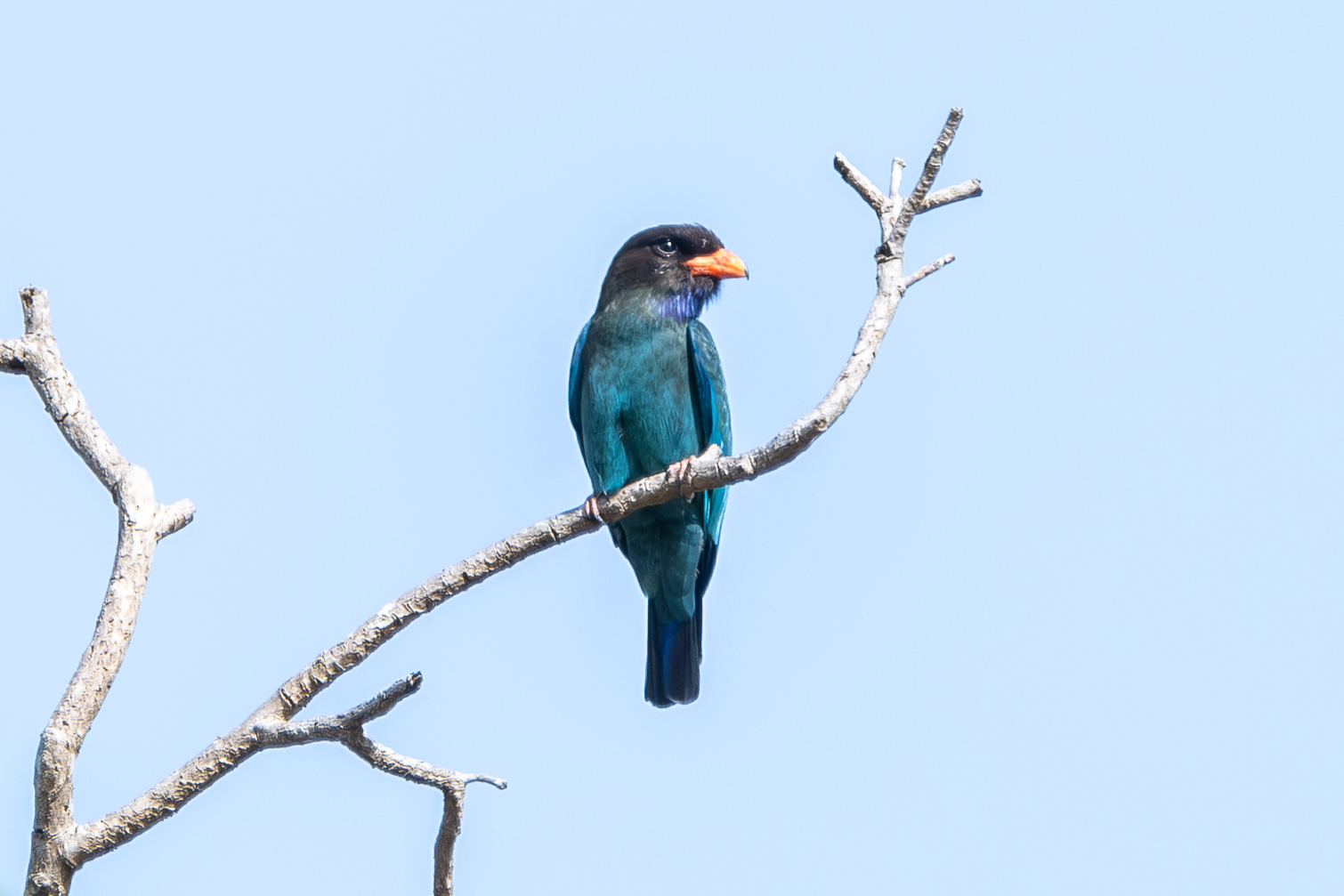
Oriental dollarbird

Rollers resemble crows in size and build, but are more closely related to the kingfishers and bee-eaters. They share the colourful appearance of those groups with blues and browns predominating. The two inner front toes are connected at the base, but the outer toe is not. There are three species (depending on taxonomy followed) which have been recorded on the islands.

Common name	Binomial	Comments
Indochinese roller	Coracias affinis	
European roller	Coracias garrulus	
Oriental dollarbird	Eurystomus orientalis	

== Kingfishers ==
Order: Coraciiformes Family: Alcedinidae

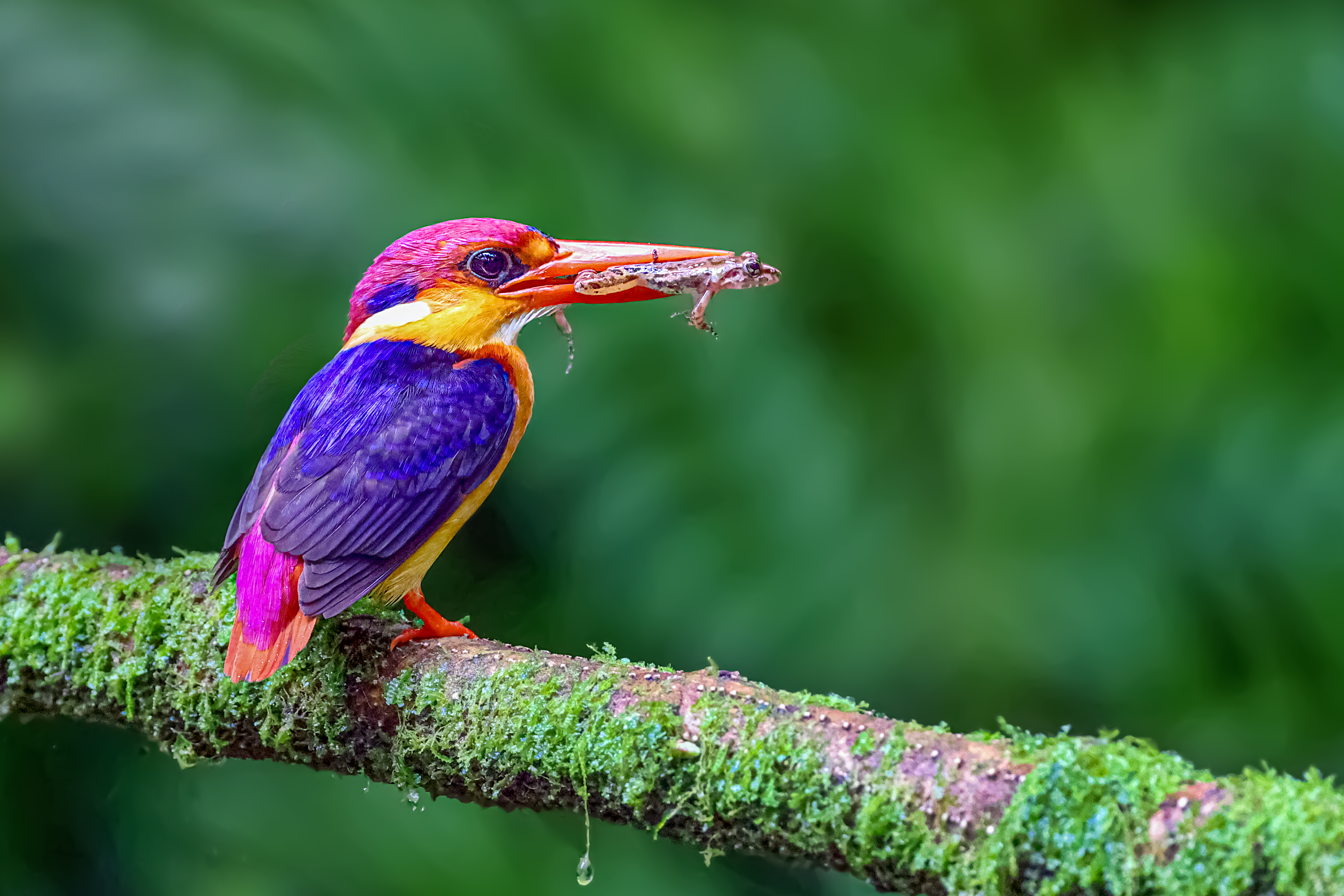
Black-backed dwarf kingfisher

Kingfishers are medium-sized birds with large heads, long, pointed bills, short legs and stubby tails. There are 9 species which have been recorded on the islands.

Common name	Binomial	Comments
Stork-billed kingfisher	Pelargopsis capensis	
Ruddy kingfisher	Halcyon coromanda	
White-throated kingfisher	Halcyon smyrnensis	
Black-capped kingfisher	Halcyon pileata	Vulnerable
Collared kingfisher	Todiramphus chloris	
Blue-eared kingfisher	Alcedo meninting	
Common kingfisher	Alcedo atthis	
Black-backed dwarf kingfisher	Ceyx erithaca	Near-threatened
Pied kingfisher	Ceryle rudis	

== Bee-eaters ==
Order: Coraciiformes Family: Meropidae

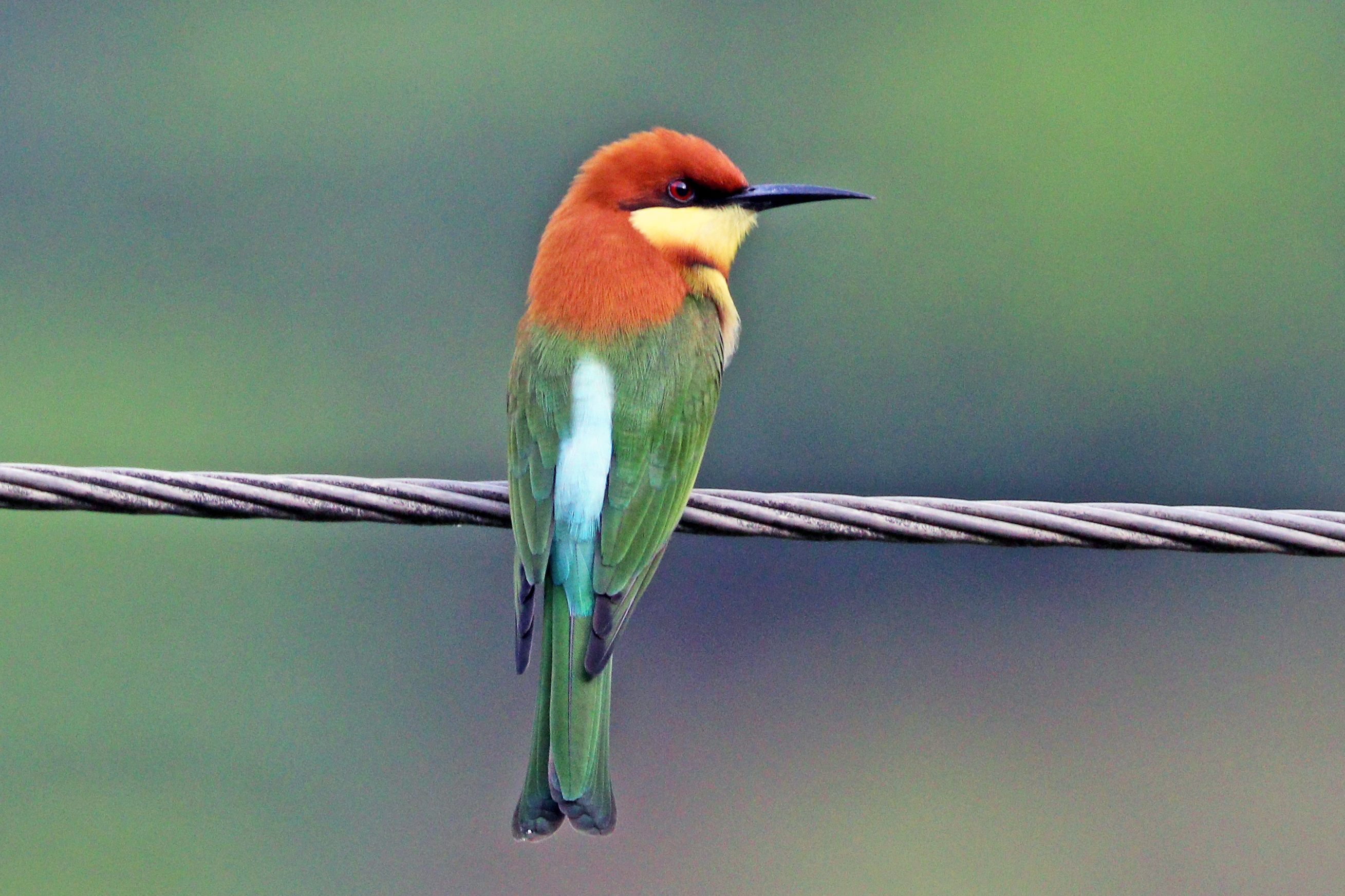
Chestnut-headed bee-eater

The bee-eaters are a group of near passerine birds in the family Meropidae. Most species are found in Africa but others occur in southern Europe, Madagascar, Australia and New Guinea. They are characterised by richly coloured plumage, slender bodies and usually elongated central tail feathers. All are colourful and have long downturned bills and pointed wings, which give them a swallow-like appearance when seen from afar. There are 4 species which have been recorded on the islands.

Common name	Binomial	Comments
Asian green bee-eater	Merops orientalis	
Blue-cheeked bee-eater	Merops persicus	
Blue-tailed bee-eater	Merops philippinus	
Chestnut-headed bee-eater	Merops leschenaulti	

== Woodpeckers ==
Order: Piciformes Family: Picidae

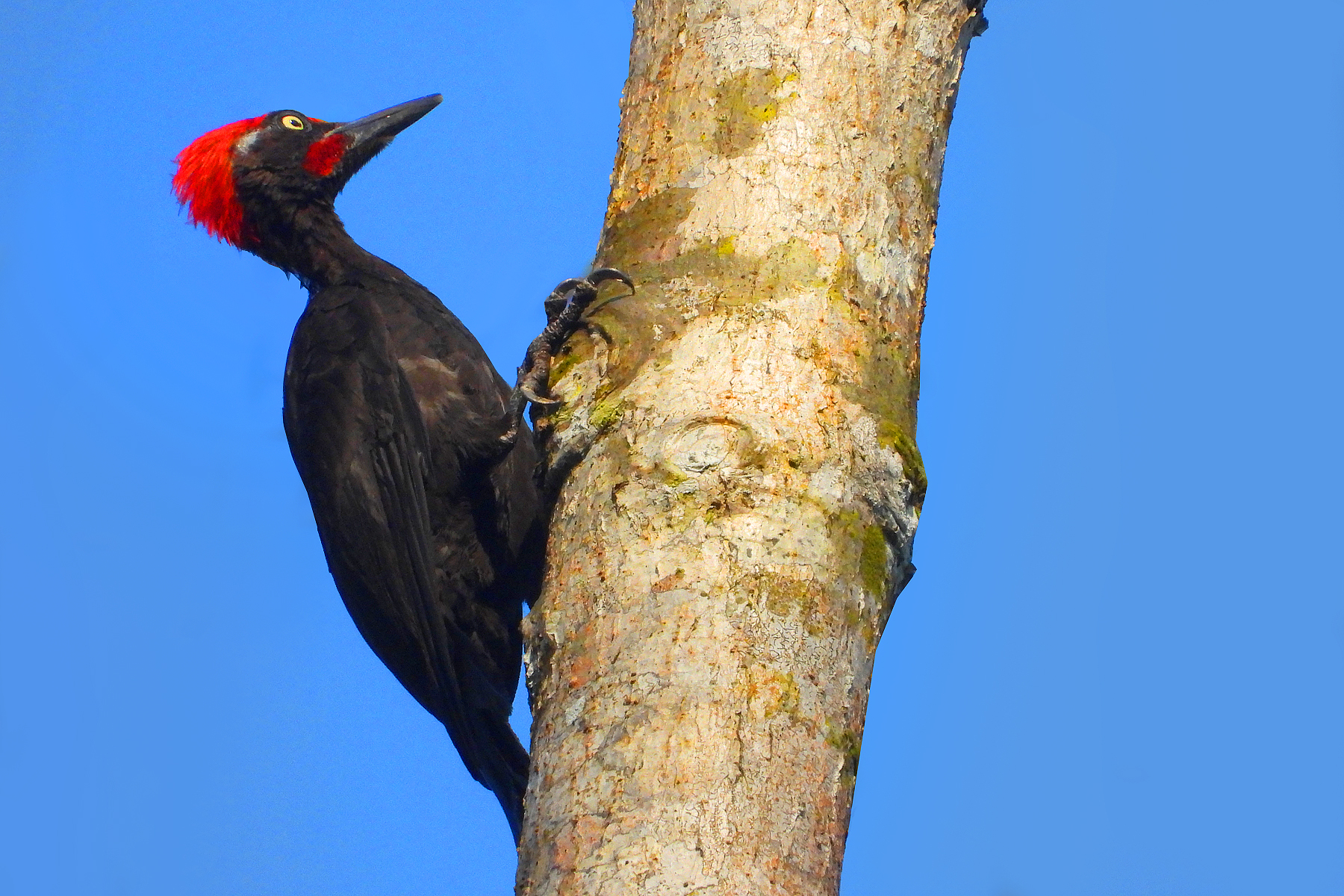
Andaman woodpecker

Woodpeckers are small to medium-sized birds with chisel-like beaks, short legs, stiff tails and long tongues used for capturing insects. Some species have feet with two toes pointing forward and two backward, while several species have only three toes. Many woodpeckers have the habit of tapping noisily on tree trunks with their beaks.

Common name	Binomial	Comments
Eurasian wryneck	Jynx torquilla	
Fulvous-breasted woodpecker	Dendrocopos macei	
Freckle-breasted woodpecker	Dendrocopos analis	
Andaman woodpecker	Dryocopus hodgei	(E) Vulnerable
Common flameback	Dinopium javanense	

== Caracaras and falcons ==
Order: Falconiformes Family: Falconidae

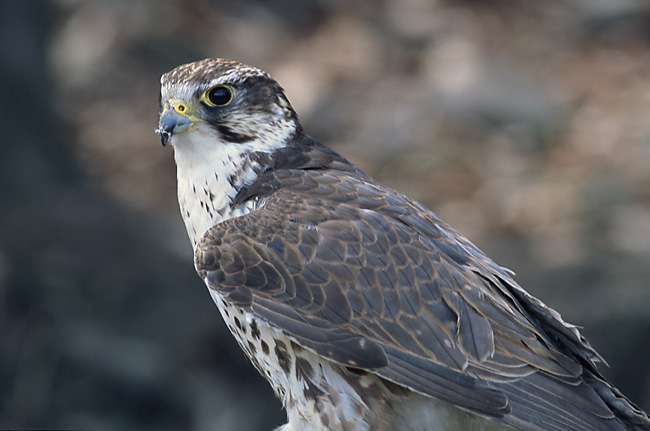
Saker falcon

Falconidae is a family of diurnal birds of prey. They differ from hawks, eagles and kites in that they kill with their beaks instead of their talons. There are five species which have been recorded on the islands.

Common name	Binomial	Comments
Lesser kestrel	Falco naumanni	
Common kestrel	Falco tinnunculus	
Amur falcon	Falco amurensis	
Saker falcon	Falco cherrug	Endangered
Peregrine falcon	Falco peregrinus	

== Old World parrots ==
Order: Psittaciformes Family: Psittaculidae

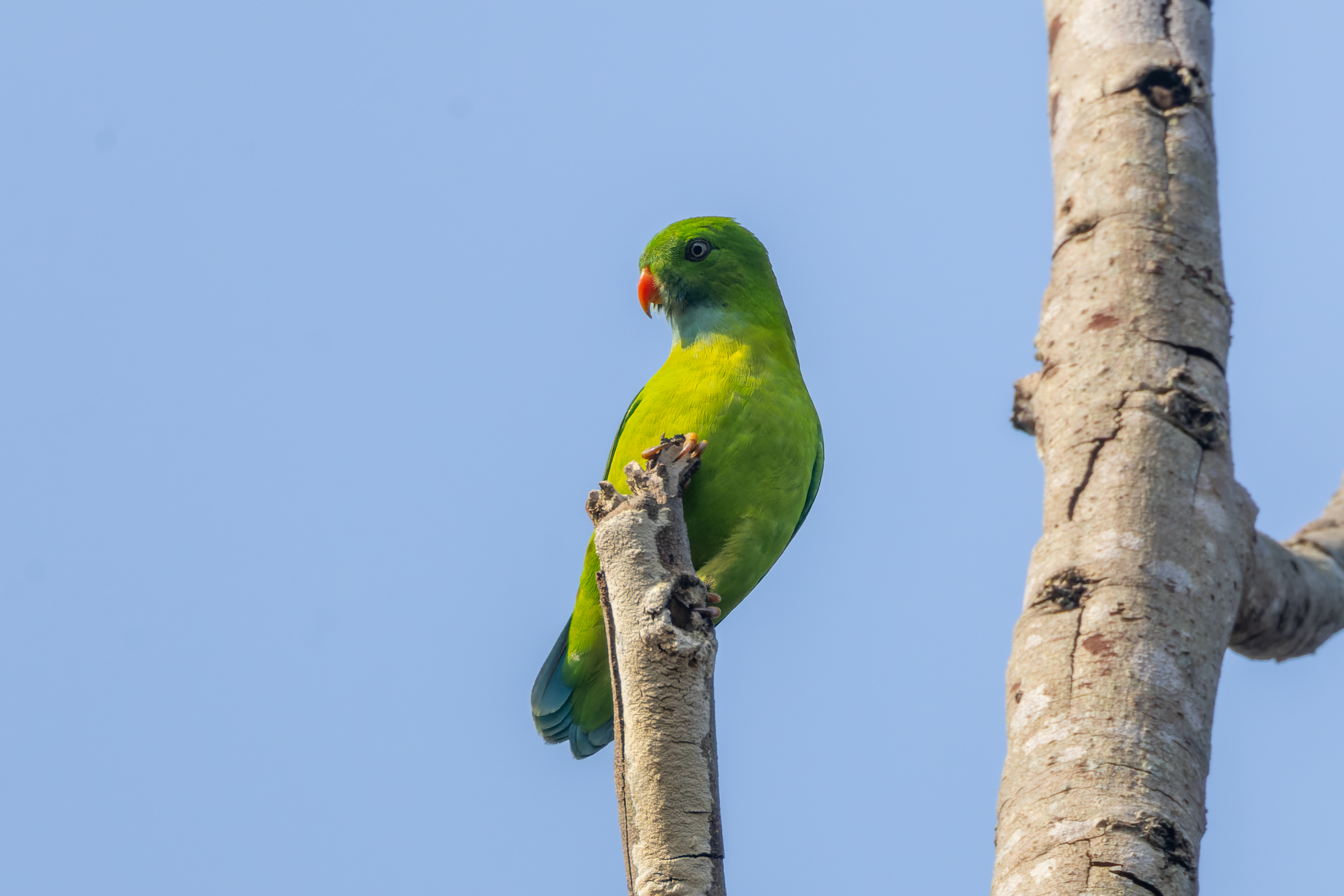
Vernal hanging parrot

Characteristic features of parrots include a strong curved bill, an upright stance, strong legs, and clawed zygodactyl feet. Many parrots are vividly coloured, and some are multi-coloured. In size they range from 8 cm (3.1 in) to 100 cm (39 in) in length. Old World parrots are found from Africa east across south and southeast Asia and Oceania to Australia and New Zealand.

Common name	Binomial	Comments
Red-breasted parakeet	Psittacula alexandri	Near-threatened
Long-tailed parakeet	Psittacula longicauda	Vulnerable
Alexandrine parakeet	Psittacula eupatria	Near-threatened
Rose-ringed parakeet	Psittacula krameri	
Nicobar parakeet	Psittacula caniceps	(E) Near-threatened
Vernal hanging parrot	Loriculus vernalis	

== Pittas ==
Order: Passeriformes Family: Pittidae

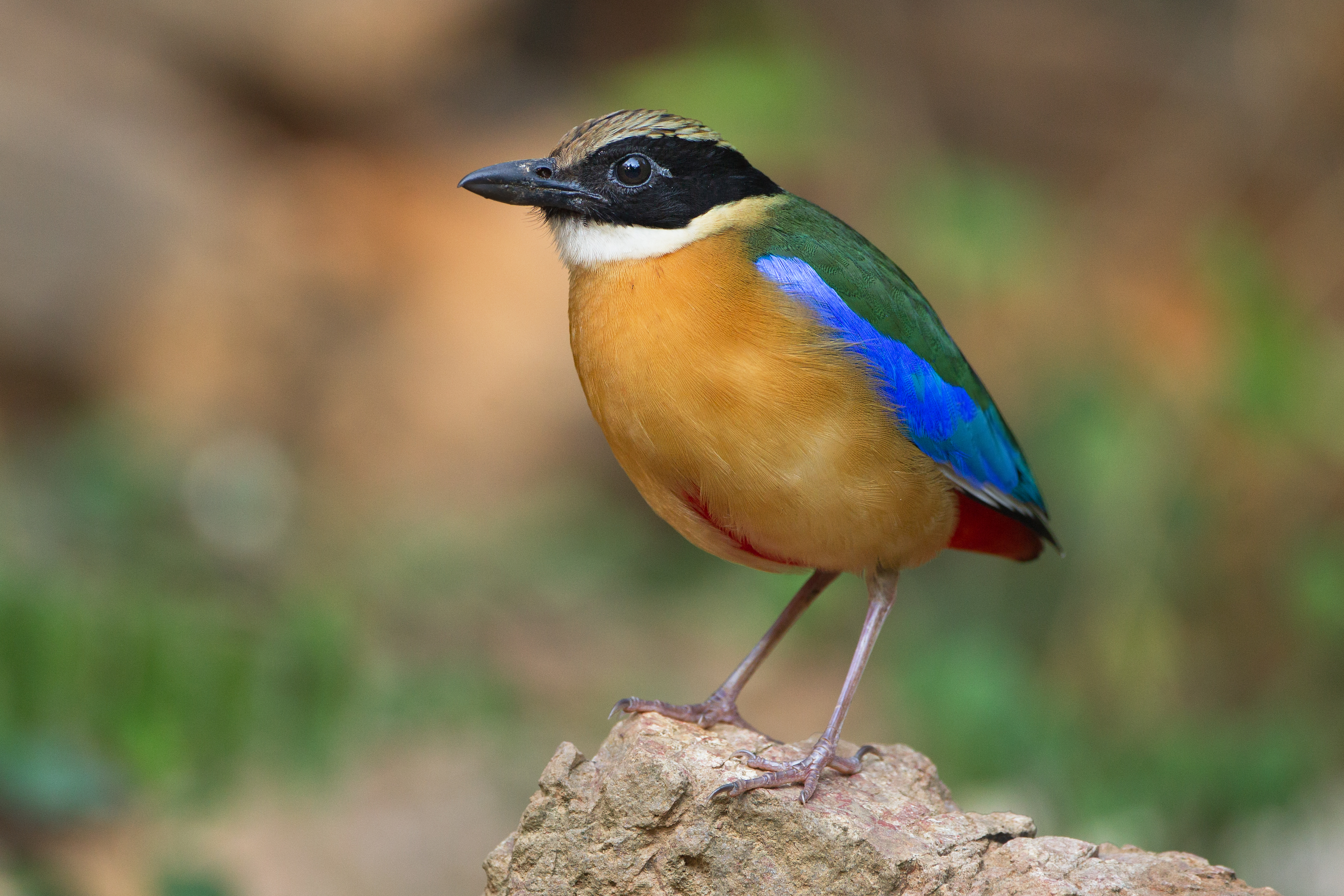
Blue-winged pitta

Pittas are medium-sized by passerine standards and are stocky, with fairly long, strong legs, short tails and stout bills. Many are brightly coloured. They spend the majority of their time on wet forest floors, eating snails, insects and similar invertebrates.

Common name	Binomial	Comments
Blue pitta	Hydrornis cyanea	(A)
Blue-winged pitta	Pitta moluccensis	(A)
Western hooded pitta	Pitta sordida	
Nicobar hooded pitta	Pitta abbotti	(E)

== Woodswallows, butcherbirds, and peltops ==
Order: Passeriformes Family: Artamidae

The woodswallows are soft-plumaged, somber-coloured passerine birds. They are smooth, agile flyers with moderately large, semi-triangular wings.

Common name	Binomial	Comments
White-breasted woodswallow	Artamus leucorynchus	

== Cuckooshrikes ==
Order: Passeriformes Family: Campephagidae

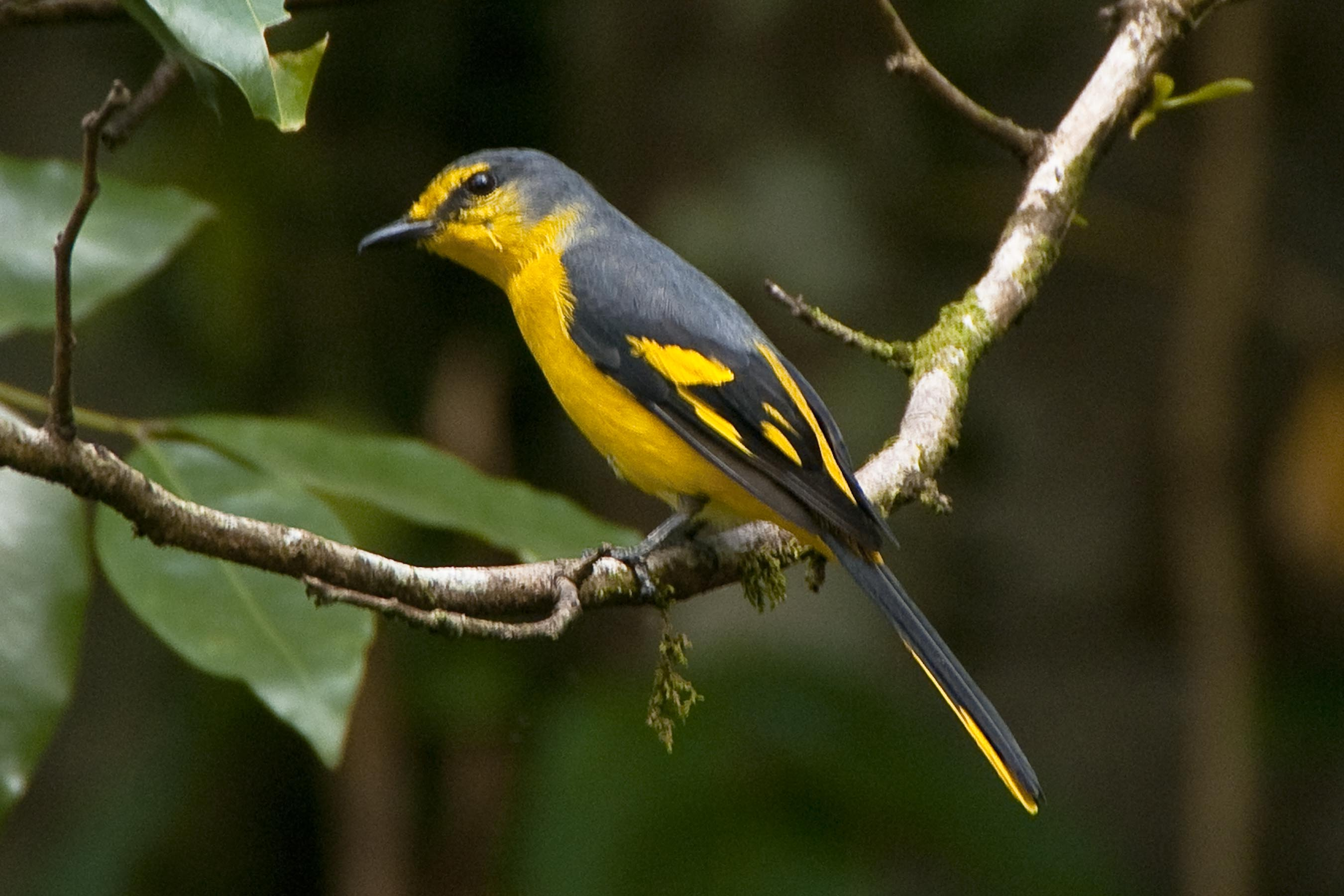
Orange minivet

The cuckooshrikes are small to medium-sized passerine birds. They are predominantly greyish with white and black, although some species are brightly coloured.

Common name	Binomial	Comments
Small minivet	Pericrocotus cinnamomeus	
Orange minivet	Pericrocotus flammeus	
Scarlet minivet	Pericrocotus speciosus	
Ashy minivet	Pericrocotus divaricatus	(A)
Swinhoe's minivet	Pericrocotus cantonensis	(A)
Indian cuckooshrike	Coracina macei	
Oriental cuckooshrike	Coracina javensis	
Andaman cuckooshrike	Coracina dobsoni	(E) Near-threatened
Pied triller	Lalage nigra	
Black-winged cuckooshrike	Lalage melaschistos	

== Whistlers and allies ==
Order: Passeriformes Family: Pachycephalidae

The family Pachycephalidae includes the whistlers, shrikethrushes, and some of the pitohuis. There is one species which occurs on the islands.

Common name	Binomial	Comments
Mangrove whistler	Pachycephala cinerea	

== Figbirds, orioles, and turnagra ==
Order: Passeriformes Family: Oriolidae

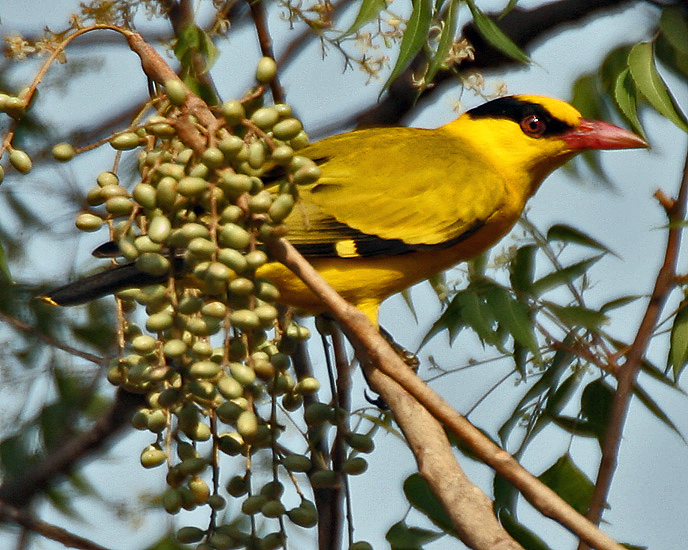
Black-naped oriole

The Old World orioles are colourful passerine birds. They are not related to the New World orioles. There are four species which have been recorded on the islands.

Common name	Binomial	Comments
Black-hooded oriole	Oriolus xanthornus	
Indian golden oriole	Oriolus kundoo	
Black-naped oriole	Oriolus chinensis	
Slender-billed oriole	Oriolus tenuirostris	

== Drongos ==
Order: Passeriformes Family: Dicruridae

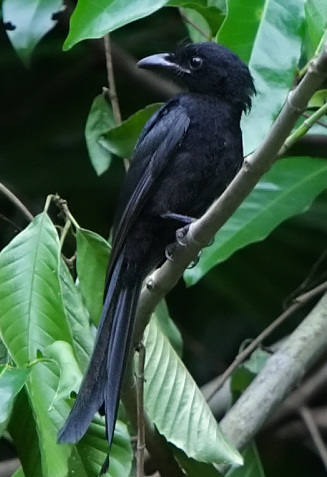
Andaman drongo

The drongos are mostly black or dark grey, sometimes with metallic tints. They have long forked tails, and some Asian species have elaborate tail decorations. They have short legs and sit very upright when perched, like a shrike. They flycatch or take prey from the ground.

Common name	Binomial	Comments
Crow-billed drongo	Dicrurus annectens	(A)
Greater racket-tailed drongo	Dicrurus paradiseus	
Andaman drongo	Dicrurus andamanensis	
Ashy drongo	Dicrurus leucophaeus	(A)
Black drongo	Dicrurus macrocercus	

== Monarchs ==
Order: Passeriformes Family: Monarchidae

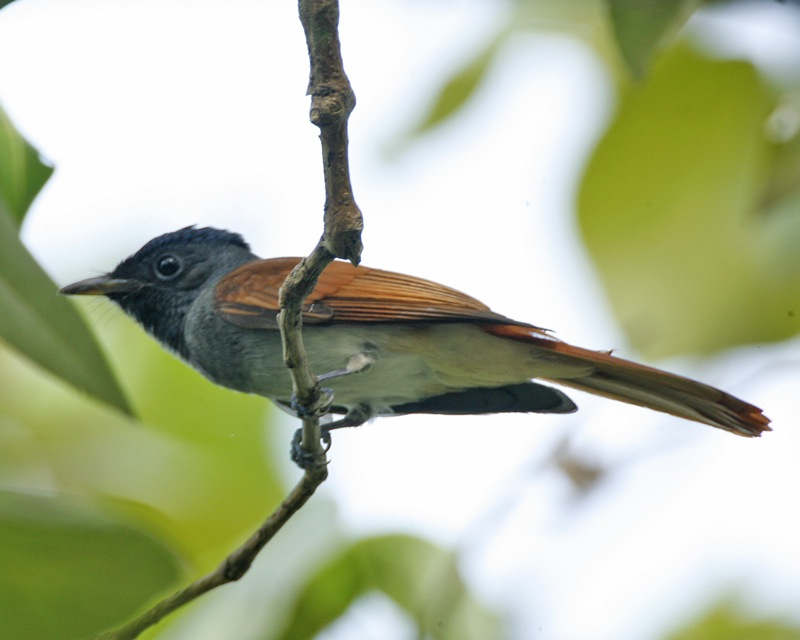
Amur paradise flycatcher

The monarch flycatchers are small to medium-sized insectivorous passerines which hunt by flycatching. There are four species which have been recorded on the islands.

Common name	Binomial	Comments
Black-naped monarch	Hypothymis azurea	
Indian paradise flycatcher	Terpsiphone paradisi	
Blyth's paradise flycatcher	Terpsiphone affinis	
Amur paradise flycatcher	Terpsiphone incei	(A)

== Shrikes ==
Order: Passeriformes Family: Laniidae

Shrikes are passerine birds known for their habit of catching other birds and small animals and impaling the uneaten portions of their bodies on thorns. A typical shrike's beak is hooked, like a bird of prey.

Common name	Binomial	Comments
Brown shrike	Lanius cristatus	

== Crows and jays ==
Order: Passeriformes Family: Corvidae

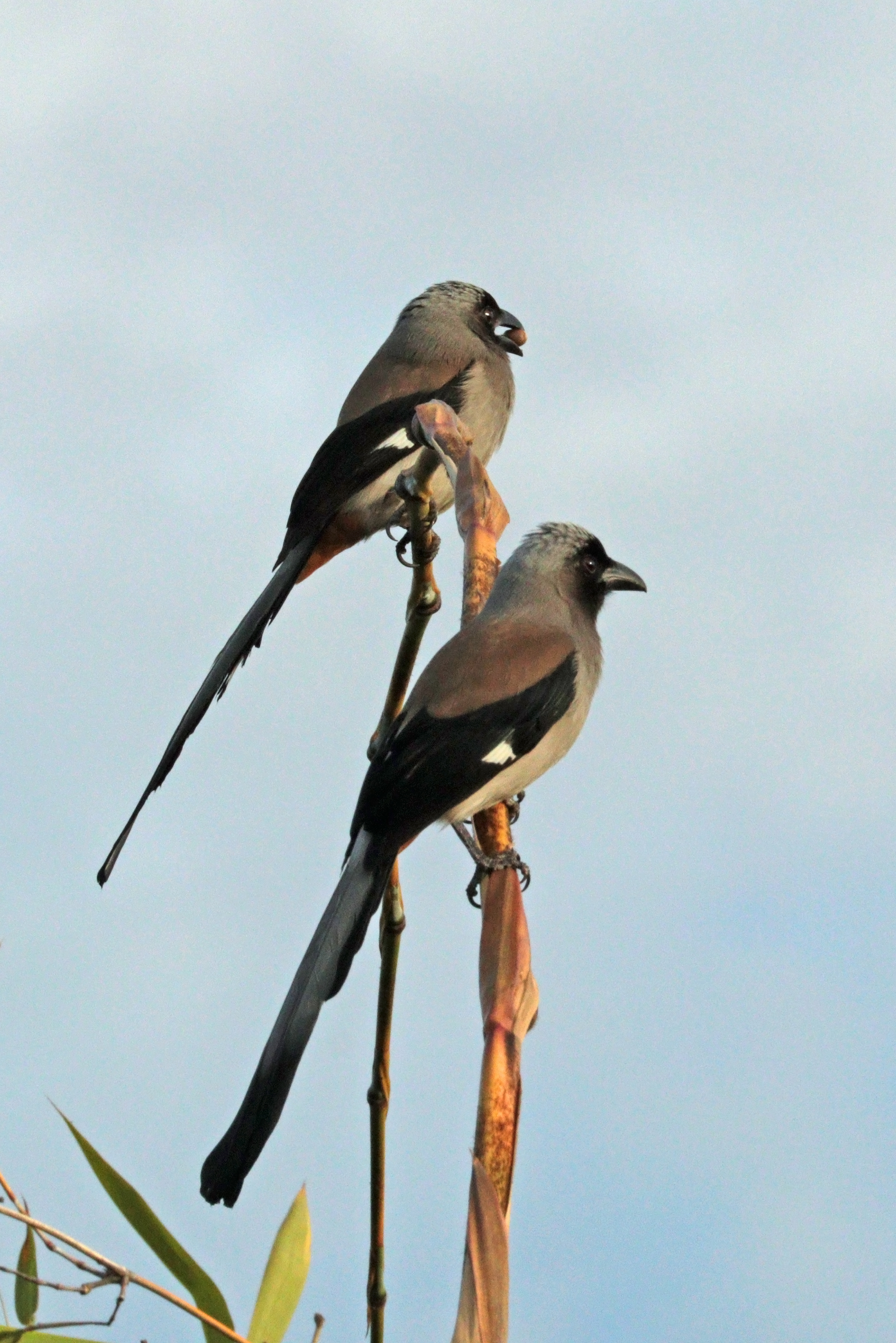
Grey treepie

The family Corvidae includes crows, ravens, jays, choughs, magpies, treepies, nutcrackers and ground jays. Corvids are above average in size among the Passeriformes, and some of the larger species show high levels of intelligence.

Common name	Binomial	Comments
Grey treepie	Dendrocitta formosae	
Andaman treepie	Dendrocitta bayleii	(E); vulnerable
House crow	Corvus splendens	(I)
Large-billed crow	Corvus macrorhynchos	
Eastern jungle crow	Corvus levaillantii	
Indian jungle crow	Corvus culminatus	

== Fairy flycatchers ==
Order: Passeriformes Family: Stenostiridae

Most of the species of this small family are found in Africa, though a few inhabit tropical Asia. They are not closely related to other birds called "flycatchers".

Common name	Binomial	Comments
Grey-headed canary-flycatcher	Culicicapa ceylonensis	

== Tits and chickadees ==
Order: Passeriformes Family: Paridae

The Paridae are mainly small stocky woodland species with short stout bills. Some have crests. They are adaptable birds, with a mixed diet including seeds and insects.

Common name	Binomial	Comments
Cinereous tit	Parus cinereus	

== Larks ==
Order: Passeriformes Family: Alaudidae

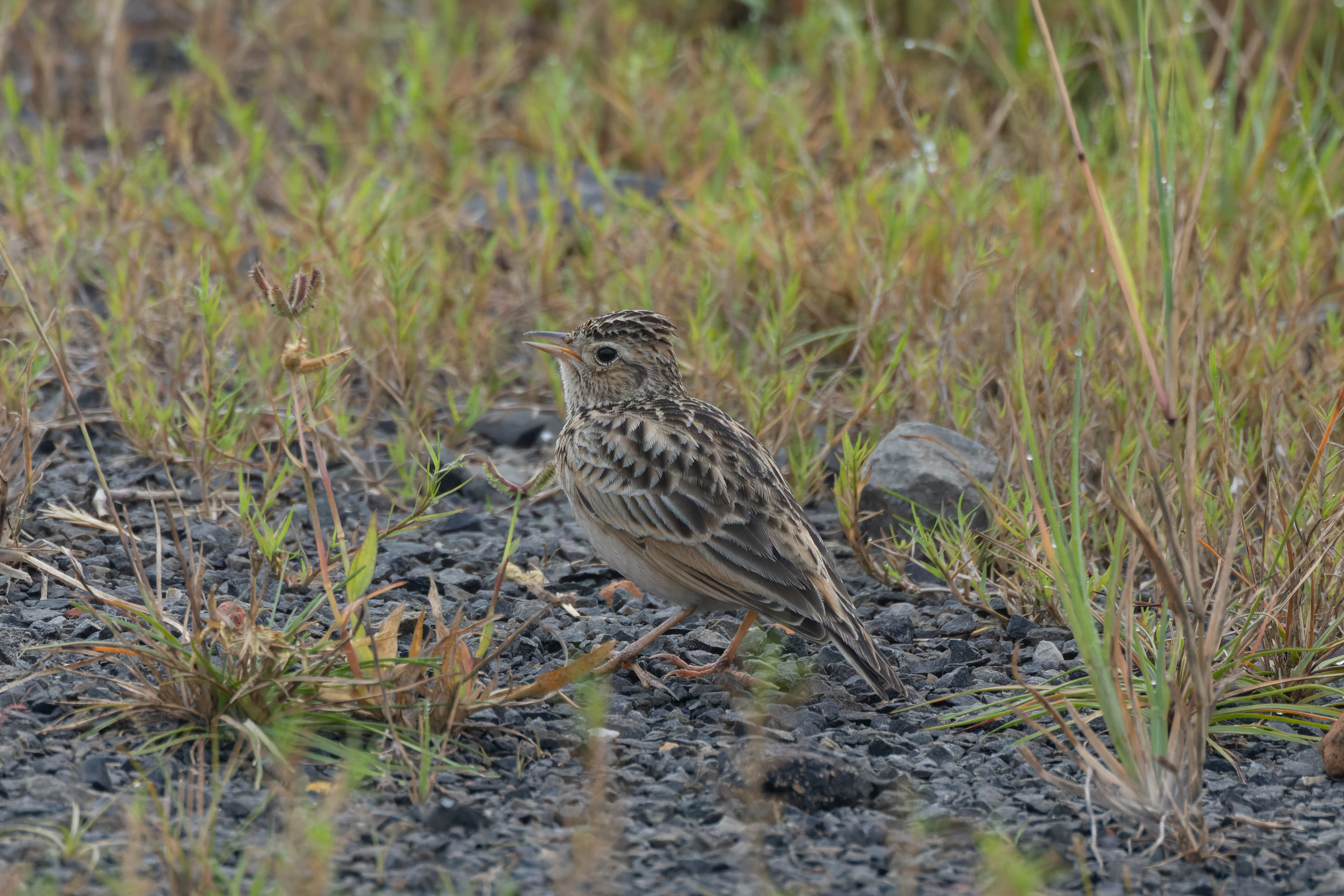
Oriental skylark

Larks are small terrestrial birds with often extravagant songs and display flights. Most larks are fairly dull in appearance. Their food is insects and seeds.

Common name	Binomial	Comments
Oriental skylark	Alauda gulgula	
Mongolian short-toed lark	Calandrella dukhunensis	
Greater short-toed lark	Calandrella brachydactyla	

== Bulbuls ==
Order: Passeriformes Family: Pycnonotidae

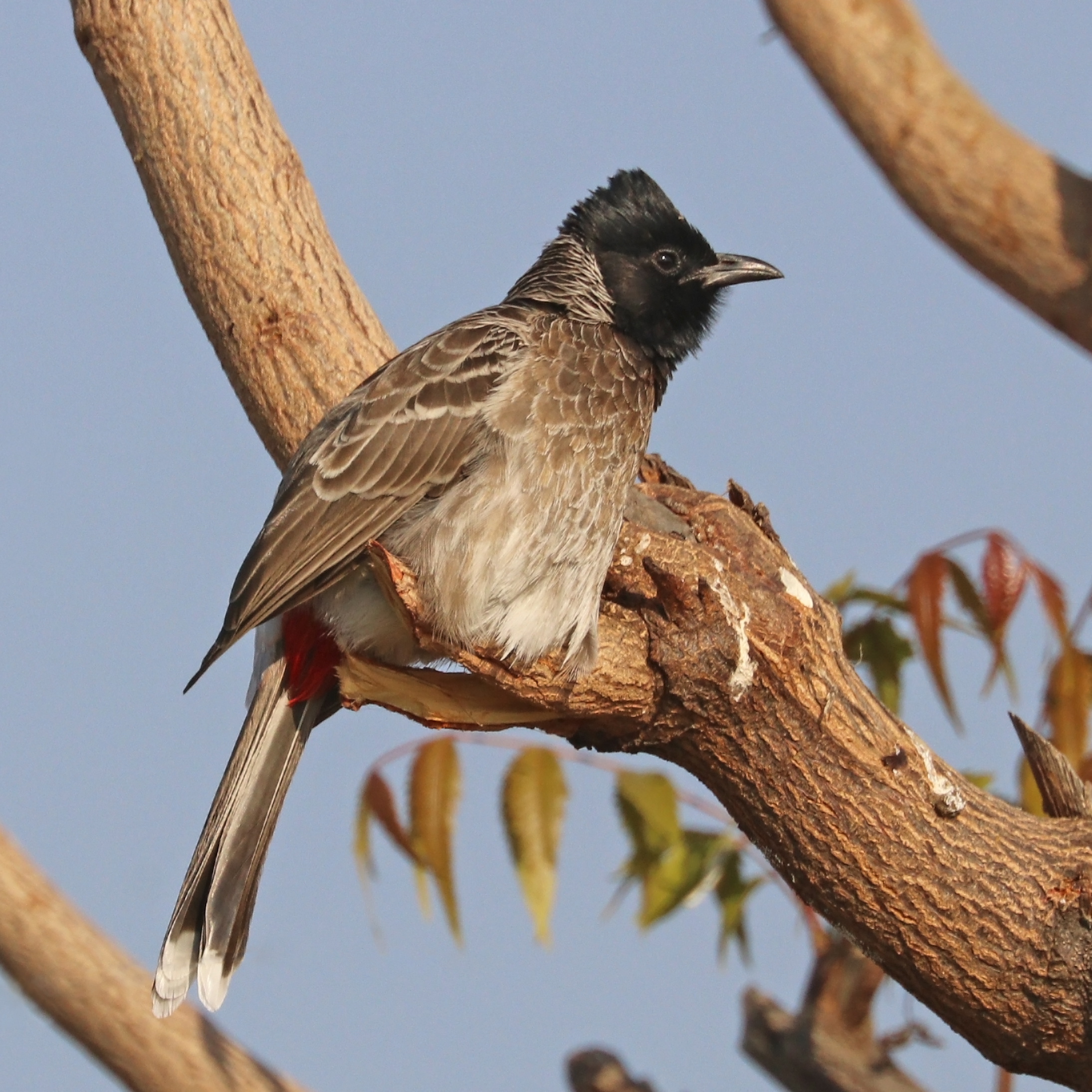
Red-vented bulbul

Bulbuls are medium-sized songbirds. Some are colourful with yellow, red or orange vents, cheeks, throats or supercilia, but most are drab, with uniform olive-brown to black plumage. Some species have distinct crests.

Common name	Binomial	Comments
Nicobar bulbul	Ixos nicobariensis	(E); Near-threatened
Andaman bulbul	Brachypodius fuscoflavescens	(E)
Red-whiskered bulbul	Pycnonotus jocosus	
Red-vented bulbul	Pycnonotus cafer	

== Swallows and martins ==
Order: Passeriformes Family: Hirundinidae

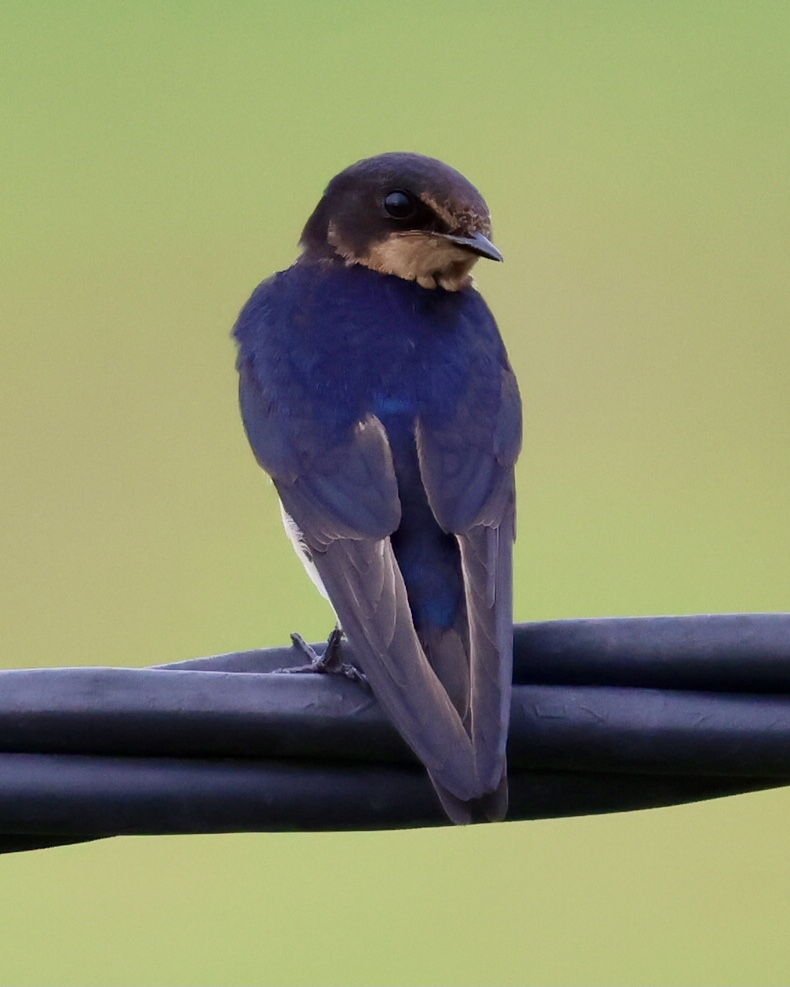
Pacific swallow

The family Hirundinidae is adapted to aerial feeding. They have a slender streamlined body, long pointed wings and a short bill with a wide gape. The feet are adapted to perching rather than walking, and the front toes are partially joined at the base.

Common name	Binomial	Comments
Sand martin	Riparia riparia	
Pale martin	Riparia diluta	
Barn swallow	Hirundo rustica	
Pacific swallow	Hirundo tahitica	
Asian house martin	Delichon dasypus	
Eastern red-rumped swallow	Cecropis daurica	

== Cettia bush warblers and allies ==
Order: Passeriformes Family: Cettiidae

Cettiidae is a family of small insectivorous songbirds. It contains the typical bush warblers (Cettia) and their relatives. Its members occur mainly in Asia and Africa, ranging into Oceania and Europe.

Common name	Binomial	Comments
Pale-footed bush warbler	Hemitesia pallidipes	

== Leaf warblers and allies ==
Order: Passeriformes Family: Phylloscopidae

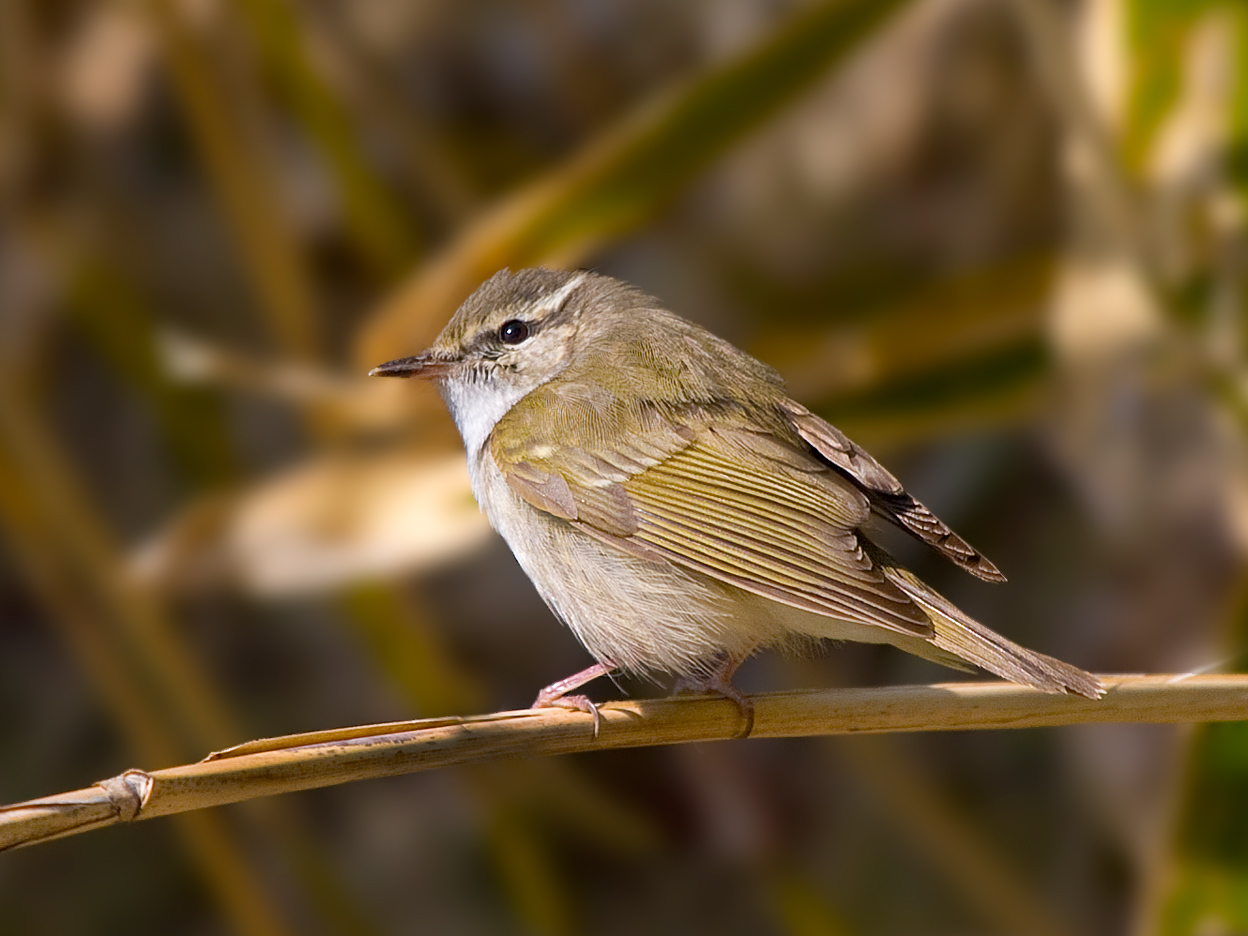
Sakhalin leaf warbler

Leaf warblers are a family of small insectivorous birds found mostly in Eurasia and ranging into Wallacea and Africa. The species are of various sizes, often green-plumaged above and yellow below, or more subdued with greyish-green to greyish-brown colours.

Common name	Binomial	Comments
Hume's leaf warbler	Phylloscopus humei	
Yellow-browed warbler	Phylloscopus inornatus	
Tickell's leaf warbler	Phylloscopus affinis	(A)
Dusky warbler	Phylloscopus fuscatus	
Willow warbler	Phylloscopus trochilus	(A)
Green warbler	Phylloscopus nitidus	
Two-barred warbler	Phylloscopus plumbeitarsus	(A)
Greenish warbler	Phylloscopus trochiloides	
Large-billed leaf warbler	Phylloscopus magnirostris	
Pale-legged leaf warbler	Phylloscopus tenellipes	(A)
Sakhalin leaf warbler	Phylloscopus borealoides	(A)
Arctic warbler	Phylloscopus borealis	(A)

== Reed warblers, Grauer's warbler, and allies ==
Order: Passeriformes Family: Acrocephalidae

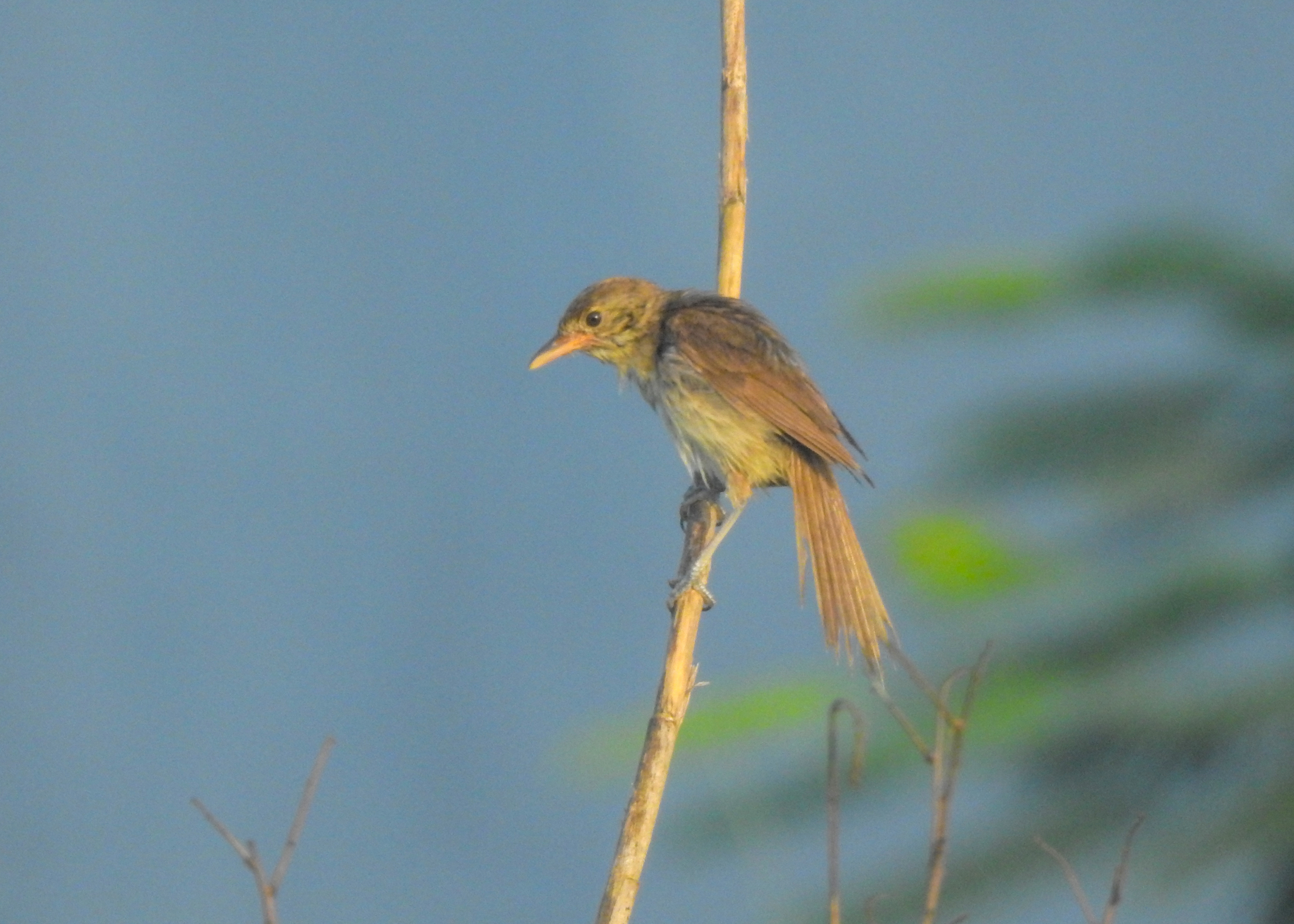
Thick-billed warbler

The members of this family are usually rather large for "warblers". Most are rather plain olivaceous brown above with much yellow to beige below. They are usually found in open woodland, reedbeds, or tall grass. The family occurs mostly in southern to western Eurasia and surroundings, but it also ranges far into the Pacific, with some species in Africa.

Common name	Binomial	Comments
Oriental reed warbler	Acrocephalus orientalis	
Clamorous reed warbler	Acrocephalus stentoreus	
Black-browed reed warbler	Acrocephalus bistrigiceps	
Blyth's reed warbler	Acrocephalus dumetorum	
Thick-billed warbler	Arundinax aedon	
Booted warbler	Iduna caligata	

== Grassbirds and allies ==
Order: Passeriformes Family: Locustellidae

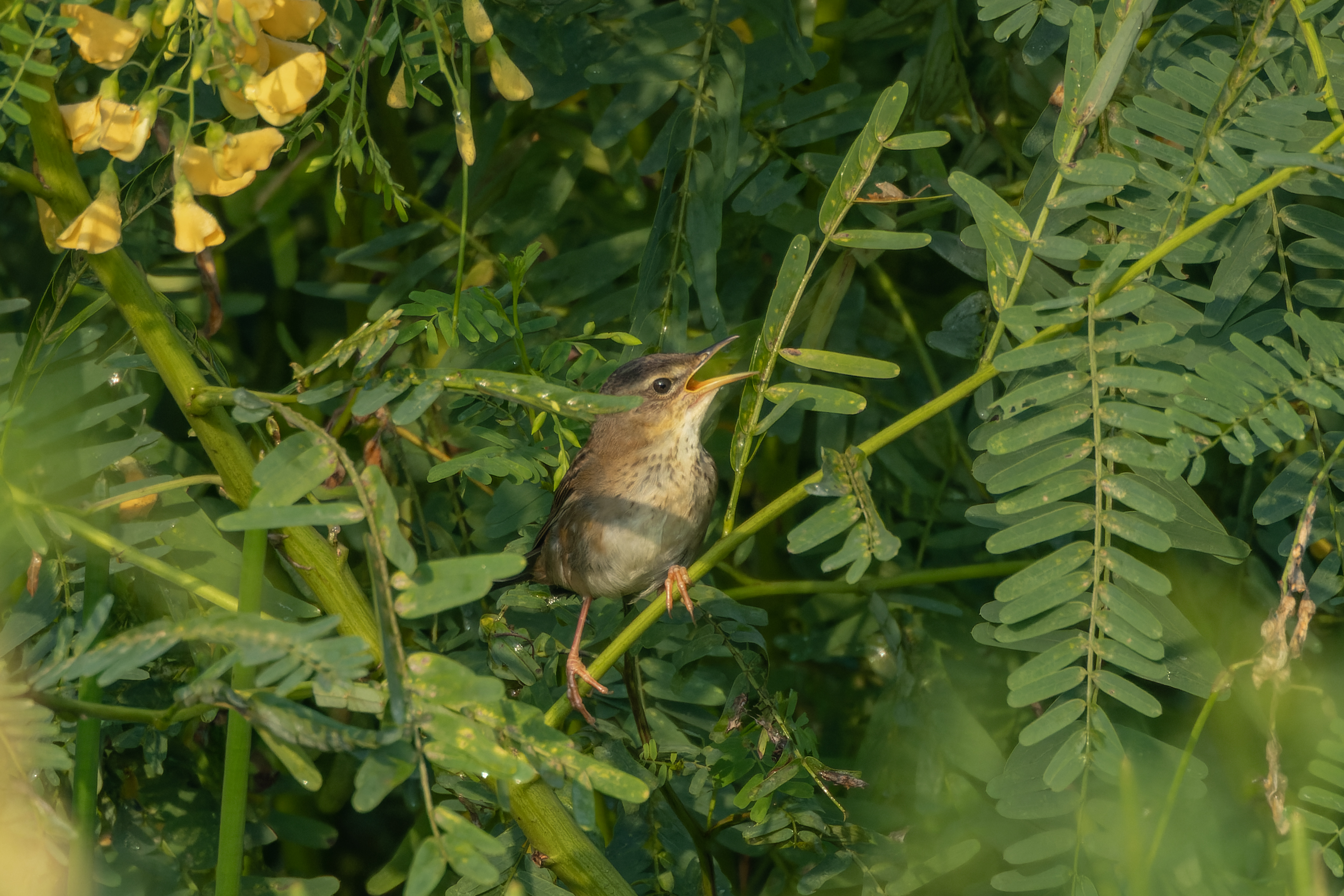
Pallas's grasshopper warbler

Locustellidae are a family of small insectivorous songbirds found mainly in Eurasia, Africa, and the Australian region. They are smallish birds with tails that are usually long and pointed, and tend to be drab brownish or buffy all over.

Common name	Binomial	Comments
Pallas's grasshopper warbler	Helopsaltes certhiola	
Lanceolated warbler	Locustella lanceolata	

== Cisticolas and allies ==
Order: Passeriformes Family: Cisticolidae

The cisticolas are warblers found mainly in warmer southern regions of the Old World. They are generally very small birds of drab brown or grey appearance found in open country such as grassland or scrub.

Common name	Binomial	Comments
Zitting cisticola	Cisticola juncidis	

== White-eyes ==
Order: Passeriformes Family: Zosteropidae

The white-eyes are small and mostly undistinguished, their plumage above being generally some dull colour like greenish-olive, but some species have a white or bright yellow throat, breast or lower parts, and several have buff flanks. As their name suggests, many species have a white ring around each eye.

Common name	Binomial	Comments
Indian white-eye	Zosterops palpebrosus	

== Fairy-bluebirds ==
Order: Passeriformes Family: Irenidae

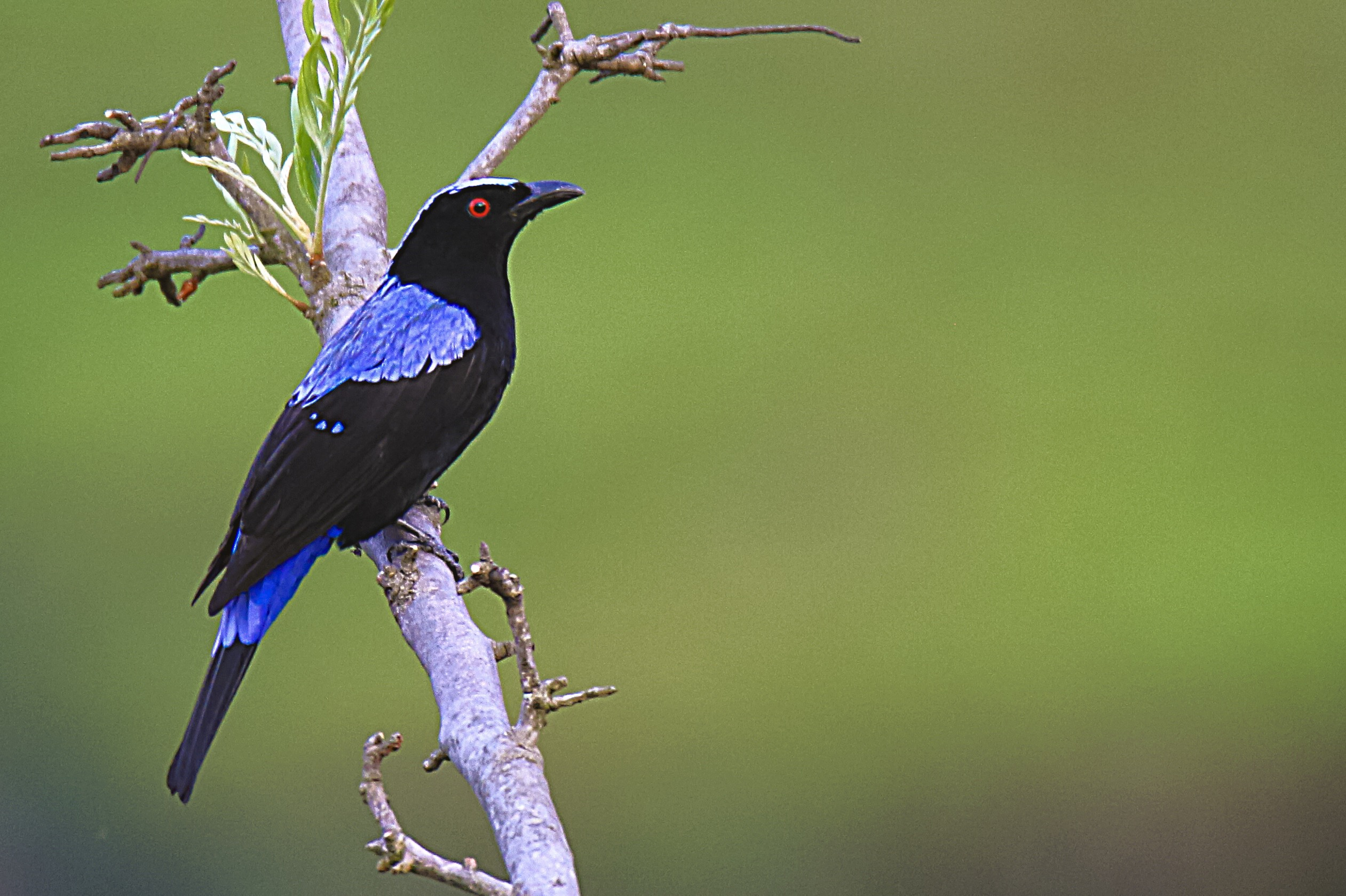
Asian fairy-bluebird

The fairy-bluebirds are bulbul-like birds of open forest or thorn scrub. The males are dark-blue and the females a duller green. There is one species which occurs on the islands.

Common name	Binomial	Comments
Asian fairy-bluebird	Irena puella	

== Starlings and rhabdornis ==
Order: Passeriformes Family: Sturnidae

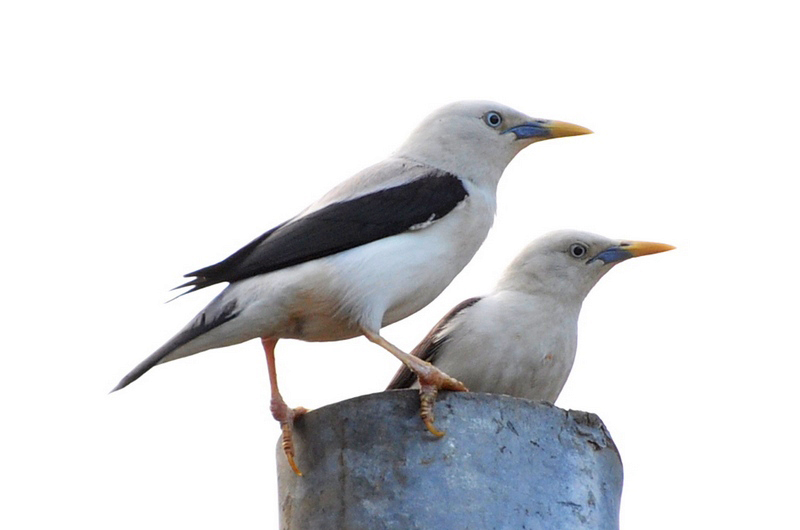
White-headed starling

Starlings are small to medium-sized passerine birds. Their flight is strong and direct and they are very gregarious. Their preferred habitat is fairly open country. They eat insects and fruit. Plumage is typically dark with a metallic sheen.

Common name	Binomial	Comments
Asian glossy starling	Aplonis panayensis	
Common hill myna	Gracula religiosa	
Jungle myna	Acridotheres fuscus	(I)
Common myna	Acridotheres tristis	(I)
Daurian starling	Agropsar sturninus	
Chestnut-cheeked starling	Agropsar philippensis	(A)
White-headed starling	Sturnia erythropygia	(E)
Rosy starling	Pastor roseus	
Common starling	Sturnus vulgaris	

== Thrushes ==
Order: Passeriformes Family: Turdidae

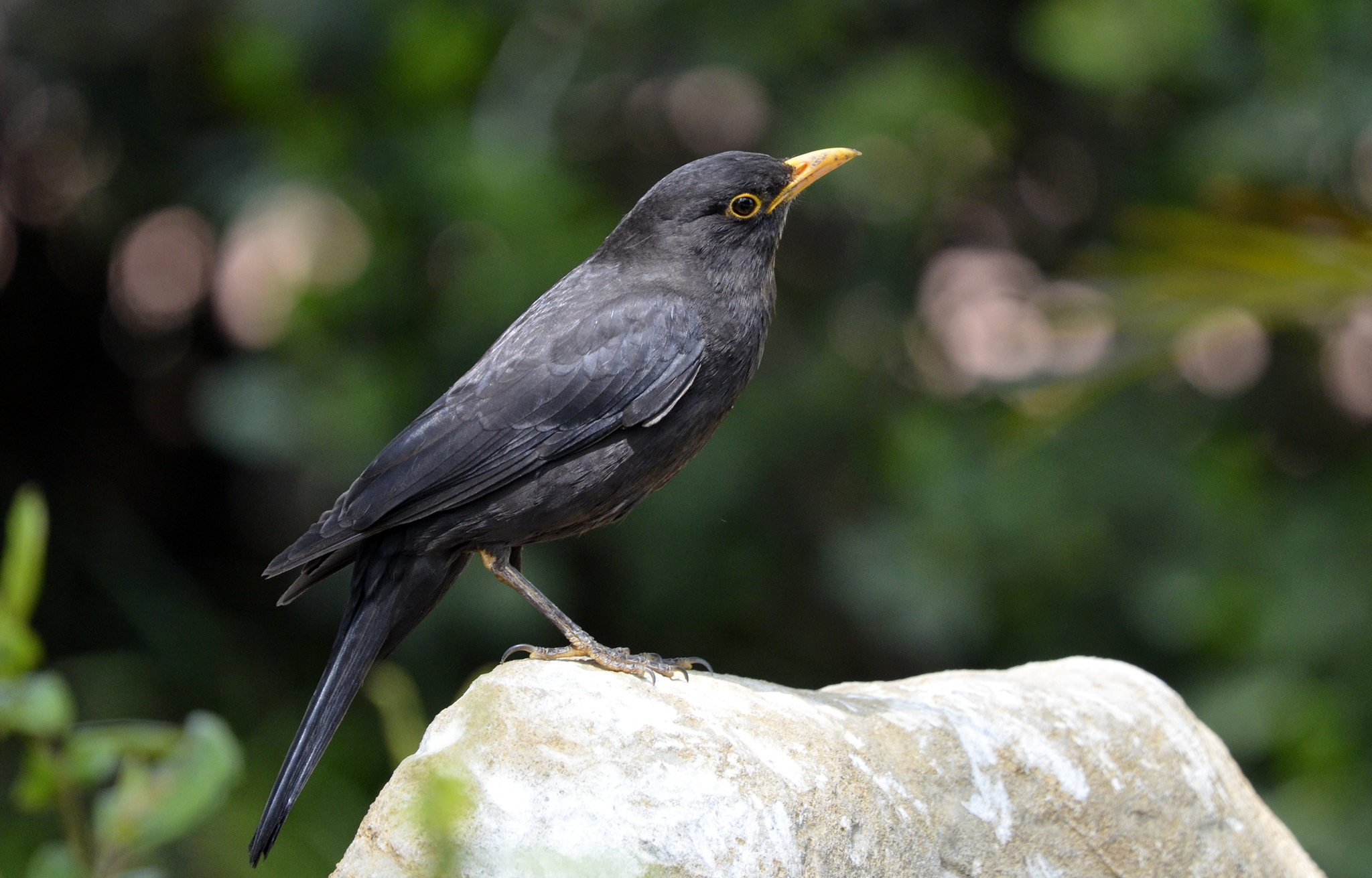
Chinese blackbird

The thrushes are a group of passerine birds that occur mainly in the Old World. They are plump, soft plumaged, small to medium-sized insectivores or sometimes omnivores, often feeding on the ground. Many have attractive songs.

Common name	Binomial	Comments
Orange-headed thrush	Geokichla citrina	
Siberian thrush	Geokichla sibirica	
Scaly thrush	Zoothera dauma	
Chinese blackbird	Turdus mandarinus	(A)
Eyebrowed thrush	Turdus obscurus	

== Chats and Old World flycatchers ==
Order: Passeriformes Family: Muscicapidae

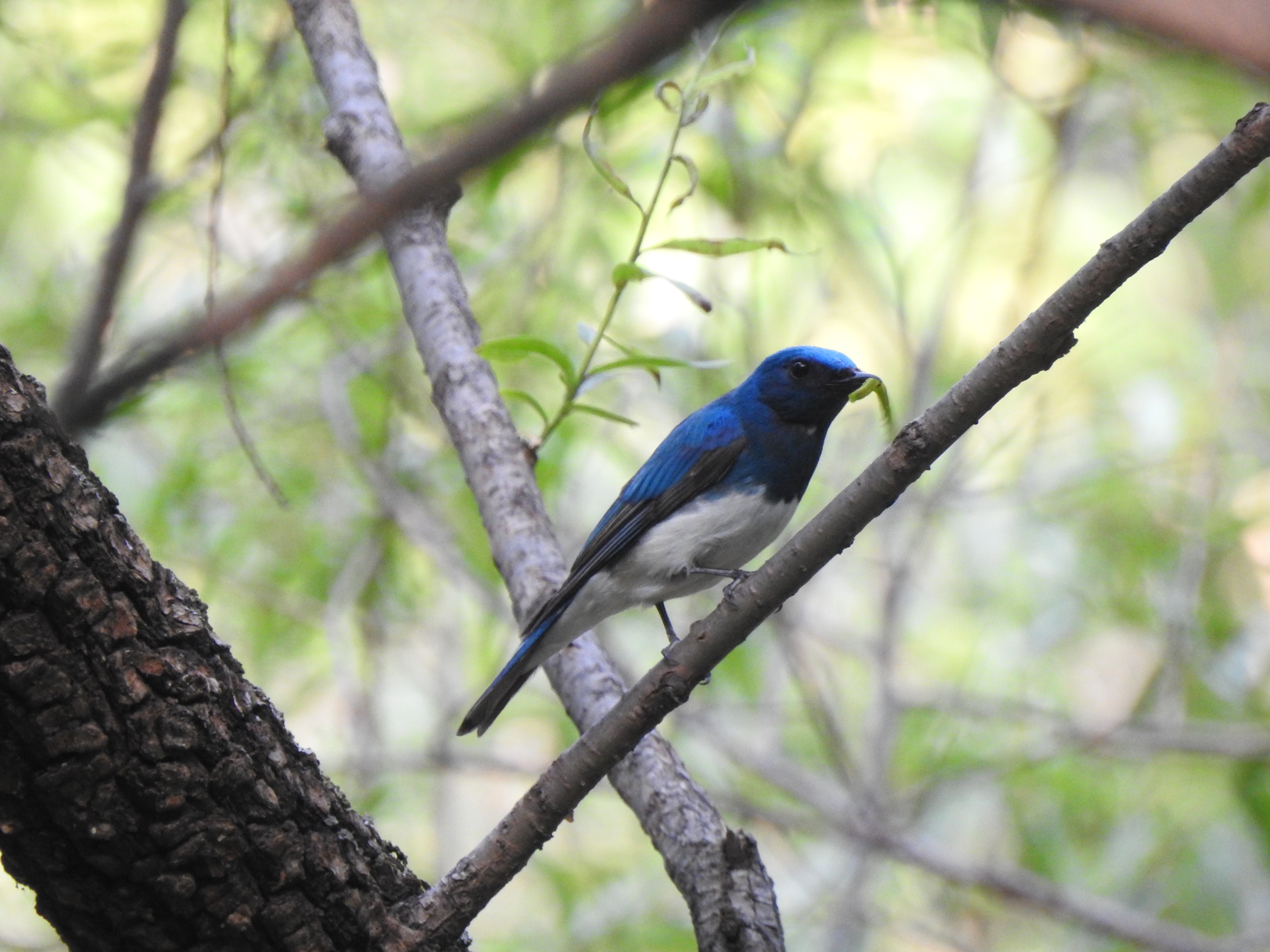
Zappey's flycatcher

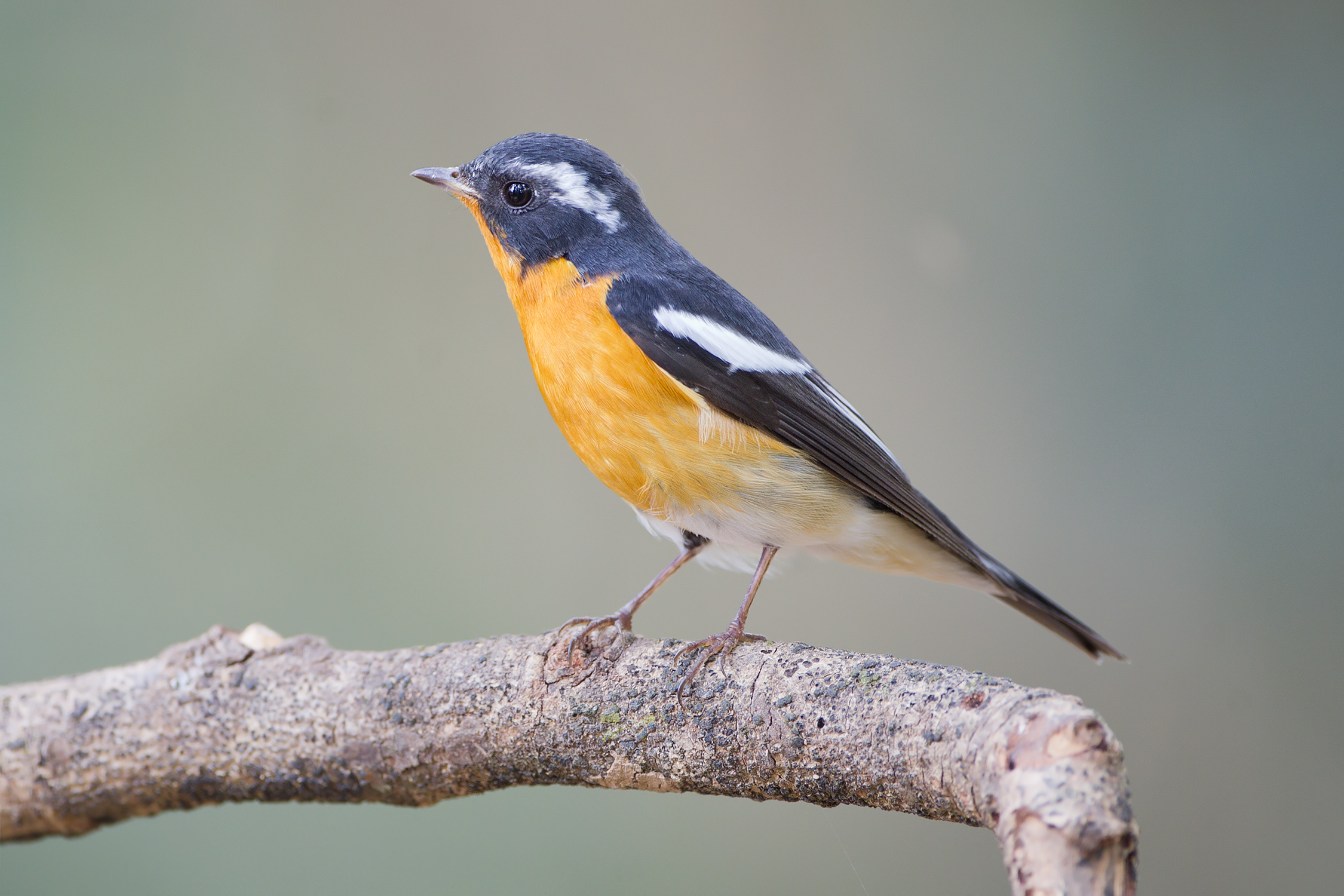
Mugimaki flycatcher

Old World flycatchers are a large group of small passerine birds native to the Old World. They are mainly small arboreal insectivores. The appearance of these birds is highly varied; some have weak songs and harsh calls but others produce some of the finest bird songs known.

Common name	Binomial	Comments
Oriental magpie-robin	Copsychus saularis	
White-rumped shama	Copsychus malabaricus	
Andaman shama	Copsychus albiventris	(E)
Dark-sided flycatcher	Muscicapa sibirica	
Asian brown flycatcher	Muscicapa dauurica	
Grey-streaked flycatcher	Muscicapa griseisticta	(A)
Ferruginous flycatcher	Muscicapa ferruginea	
Tickell's blue flycatcher	Cyornis tickelliae	
Blue-throated blue flycatcher	Cyornis rubeculoides	
Nicobar jungle flycatcher	Cyornis nicobaricus	(E); near threatened
Blue-and-white flycatcher	Cyanoptila cyanomelana	(A)
Zappey's flycatcher	Cyanoptila cumatilis	(A) Near-threatened
Verditer flycatcher	Eumyias thalassinus	
Siberian blue robin	Larvivora cyane	(A)
Bluethroat	Luscinia svecica	
Siberian rubythroat	Calliope calliope	
Blue-fronted robin	Cinclidium frontale	
Yellow-rumped flycatcher	Ficedula zanthopygia	(A)
Mugimaki flycatcher	Ficedula mugimaki	
Taiga flycatcher	Ficedula albicilla	
Red-breasted flycatcher	Ficedula parva	
Blue-fronted redstart	Phoenicurus frontalis	
Blue rock thrush	Monticola solitarius	
Siberian stonechat	Saxicola maurus	
Amur stonechat	Saxicola stejnegeri	

== Flowerpeckers ==
Order: Passeriformes Family: Dicaeidae

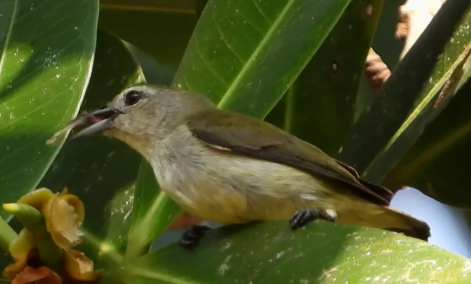
Andaman flowerpecker

The flowerpeckers are very small, stout, often brightly coloured birds, with short tails, short thick curved bills and tubular tongues.

Common name	Binomial	Comments
Pale-billed flowerpecker	Dicaeum erythrorhynchos	
Plain flowerpecker	Dicaeum minullum	
Andaman flowerpecker	Dicaeum virescens	(E)

== Sunbirds ==
Order: Passeriformes Family: Nectariniidae

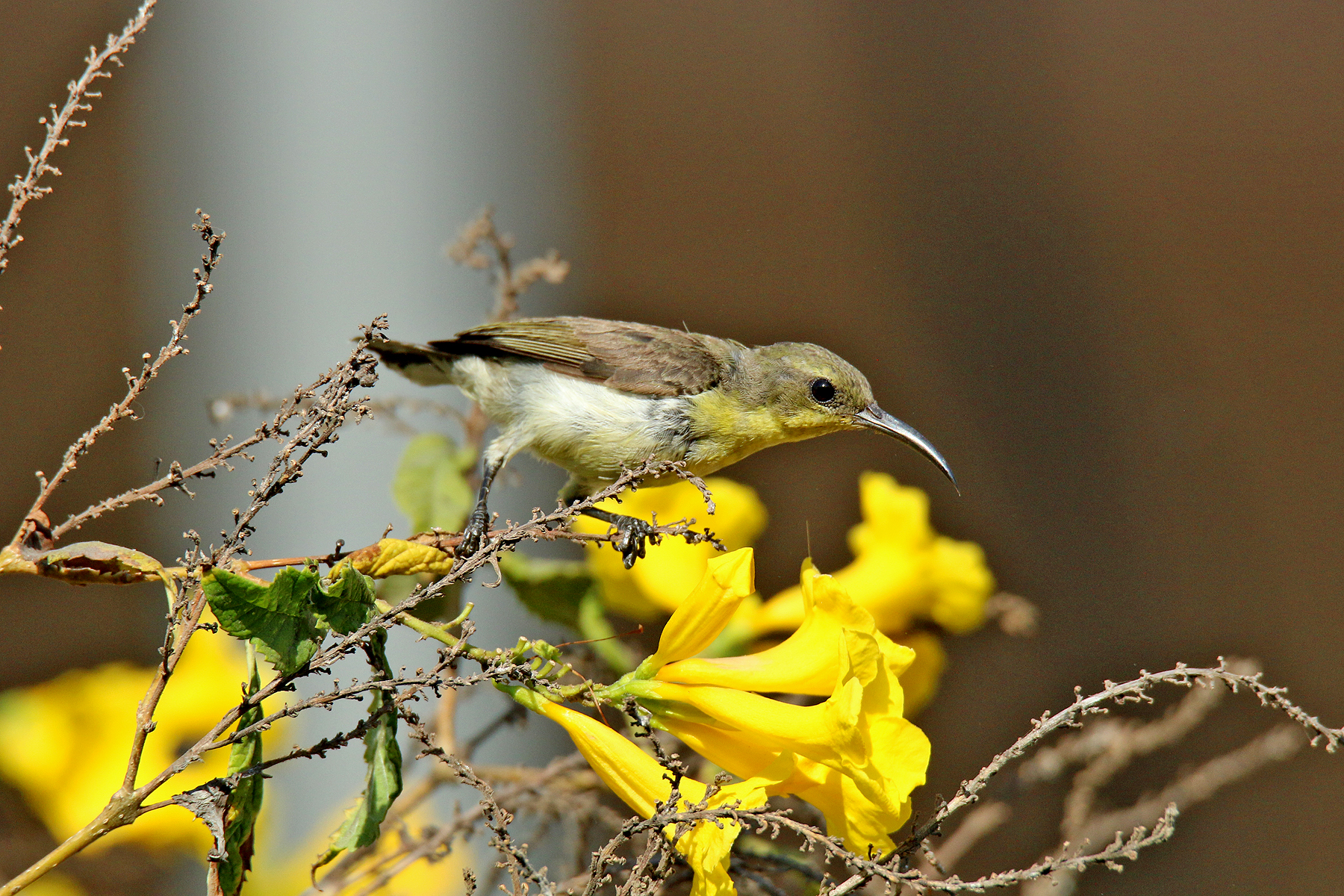
Ornate sunbird

The sunbirds and spiderhunters are very small passerine birds which feed largely on nectar, although they will also take insects, especially when feeding young. Flight is fast and direct on their short wings. Most species can take nectar by hovering like a hummingbird, but usually perch to feed.

Common name	Binomial	Comments
Ornate sunbird	Cinnyris ornatus	
Crimson sunbird	Aethopyga siparaja	

== Old World sparrows and snowfinches ==
Order: Passeriformes Family: Passeridae

Sparrows are small passerine birds. In general, sparrows tend to be small, plump, brown or grey birds with short tails and short powerful beaks. Sparrows are seed eaters, but they also consume small insects.

Common name	Binomial	Comments
House sparrow	Passer domesticus	(I)
Eurasian tree sparrow	Passer montanus	Extirpated

== Waxbills, munias, and allies ==
Order: Passeriformes Family: Estrildidae

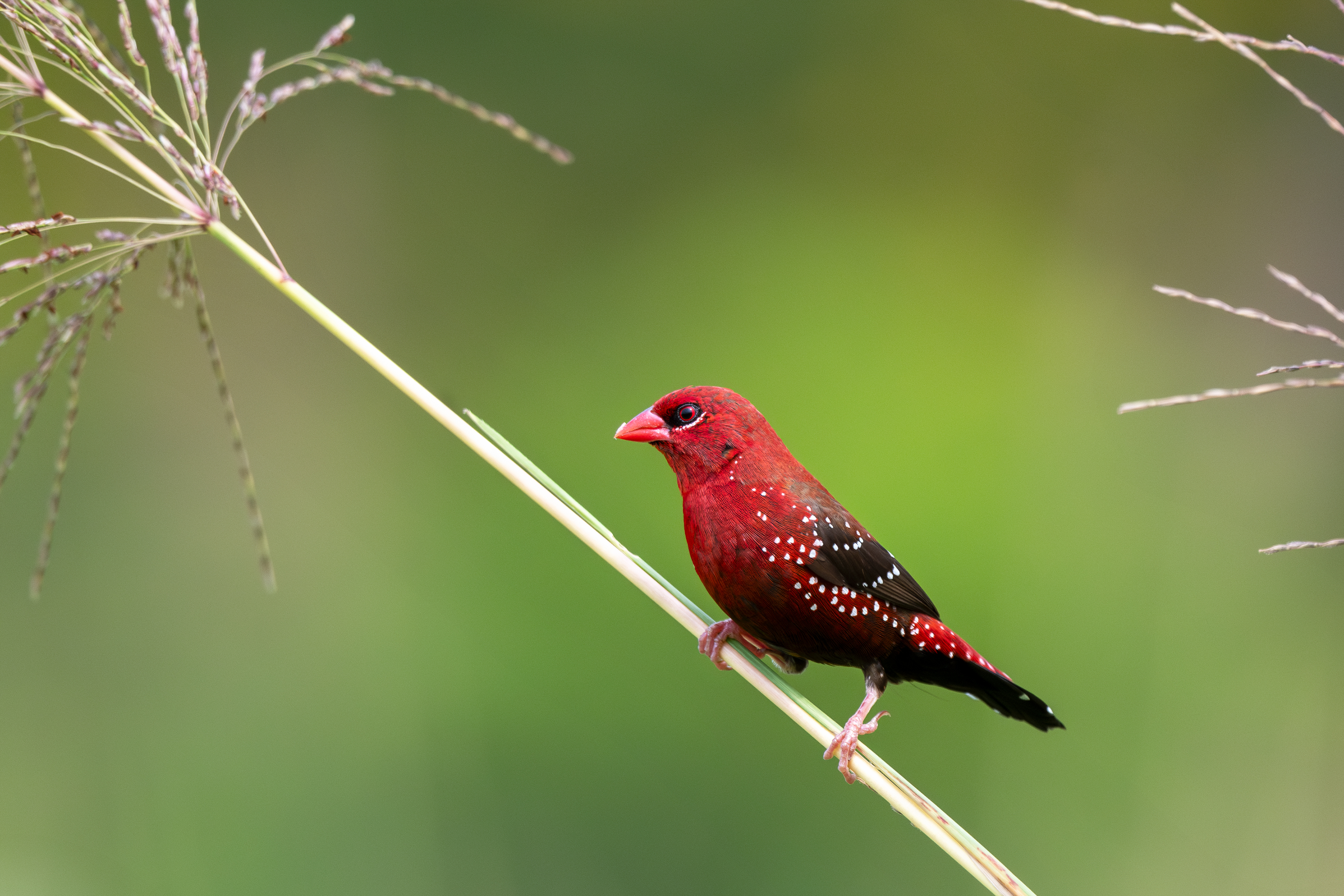
Red avadavat

The estrildid finches are small passerine birds of the Old World tropics and Australasia. They are gregarious and often colonial seed eaters with short thick but pointed bills. They are all similar in structure and habits, but have wide variation in plumage colours and patterns.

Common name	Binomial	Comments
Scaly-breasted munia	Lonchura punctulata	
White-rumped munia	Lonchura striata	
Red avadavat	Amandava amandava	Extirpated

== Wagtails and pipits ==
Order: Passeriformes Family: Motacillidae

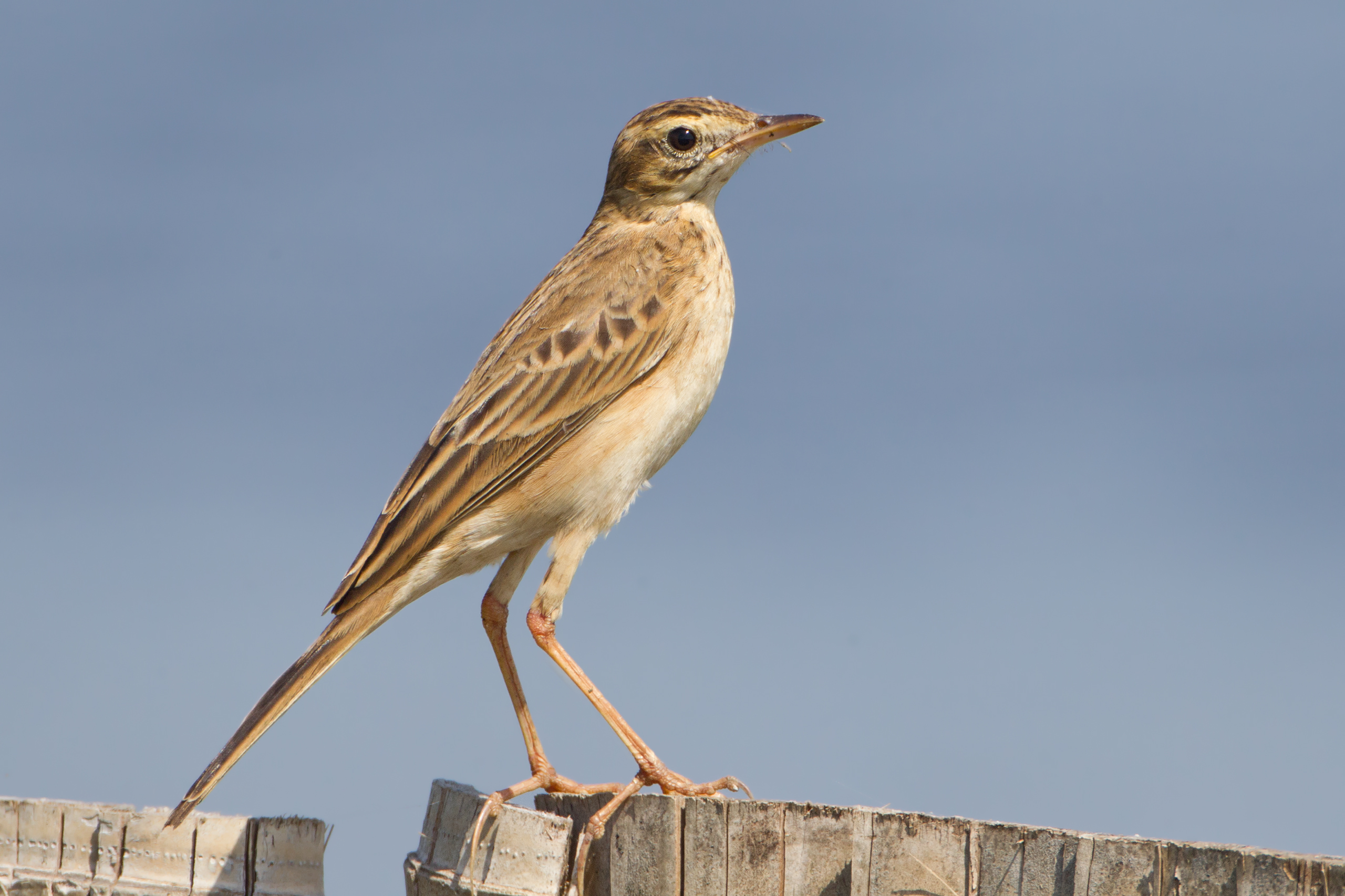
Richard's pipit

Motacillidae is a family of small passerine birds with medium to long tails. They include the wagtails, longclaws and pipits. They are slender, ground feeding insectivores of open country.

Common name	Binomial	Comments
Forest wagtail	Dendronanthus indicus	
Western yellow wagtail	Motacilla flava	
Eastern yellow wagtail	Motacilla tschutschensis	
Citrine wagtail	Motacilla citreola	
Grey wagtail	Motacilla cinerea	
White wagtail	Motacilla alba	
Richard's pipit	Anthus richardi	
Paddyfield pipit	Anthus rufulus	
Blyth's pipit	Anthus godlewskii	
Red-throated pipit	Anthus cervinus	

== Finches and euphonias ==
Order: Passeriformes Family: Fringillidae

Finches are seed-eating passerine birds, that are small to moderately large and have a strong beak, usually conical and in some species very large. All have twelve tail feathers and nine primaries. These birds have a bouncing flight with alternating bouts of flapping and gliding on closed wings, and most sing well.

Common name	Binomial	Comments
Common rosefinch	Carpodacus erythrinus	(A)

== Buntings ==
Order: Passeriformes Family: Emberizidae

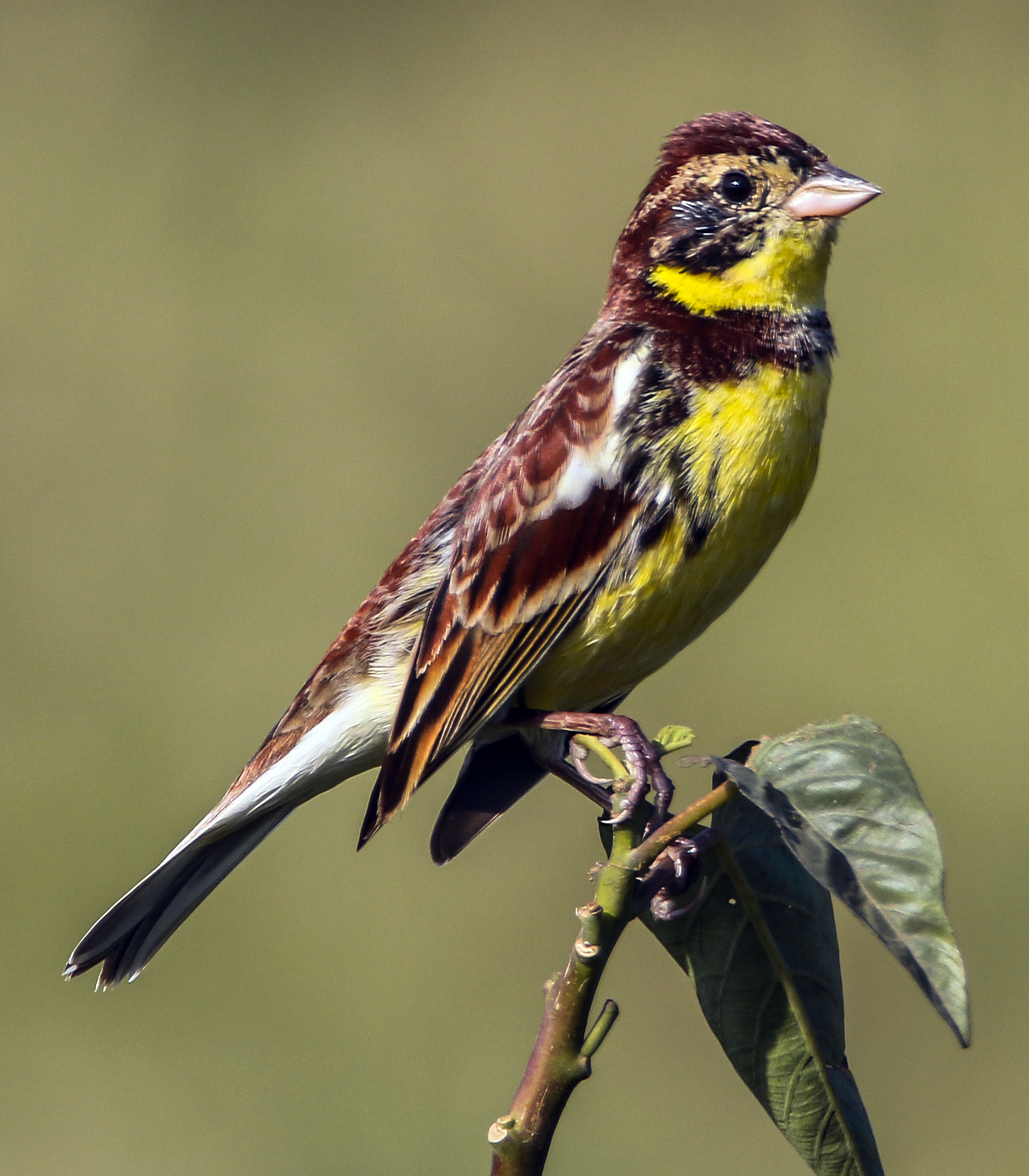
Yellow-breasted bunting

The emberizids are a large family of passerine birds. They are seed-eating birds with distinctively shaped bills. Many emberizid species have distinctive head patterns.

Common name	Binomial	Comments
Ortolan bunting	Emberiza hortulana	(A)
Chestnut-eared bunting	Emberiza fucata	
Little bunting	Emberiza pusilla	
Yellow-browed bunting	Emberiza chrysophrys	(A)
Yellow-breasted bunting	Emberiza aureola	(A) Critically endangered
Chestnut bunting	Emberiza rutila	
Black-headed bunting	Emberiza melanocephala	
Black-faced bunting	Emberiza spodocephala	
