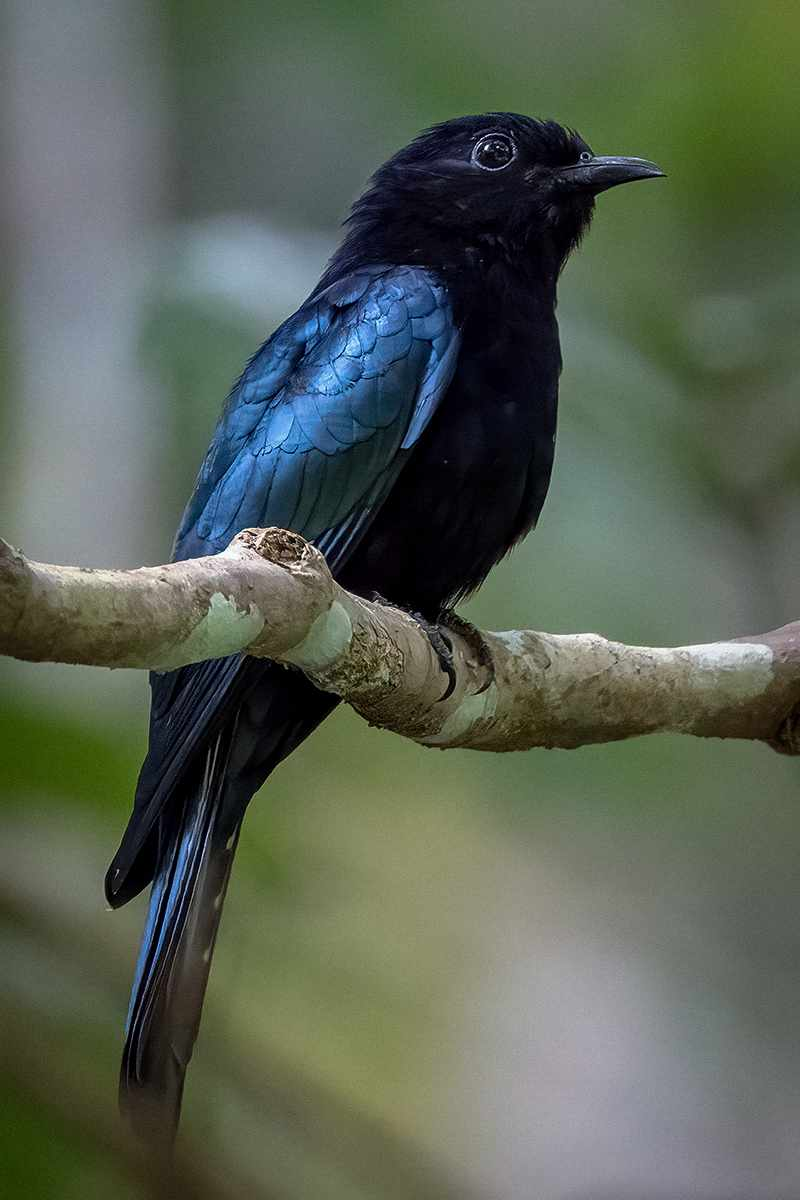
- Nominate subspecies

Conservation status
- Least Concern (IUCN 3.1)

Scientific classification
- Kingdom: Animalia
- Phylum: Chordata
- Class: Aves
- Order: Passeriformes
- Family: Dicruridae
- Genus: Dicrurus
- Species: D. striatus

Binomial name
- Dicrurus striatus Tweeddale, 1877

= Short-tailed drongo =

Species of bird

The short-tailed drongo (Dicrurus striatus) is a species of passerine bird in the family Dicruridae. It is endemic to the Philippines. Its natural habitat is tropical moist lowland forests. It was formerly conspecific with the Hair-crested drongo but was designated as unique based on its different sounding call, physical differences and through molecular studies.

== Description and taxonomy ==
It was formerly conspecific with the Hair-crested drongo species complex which has now been split into 7 different subspecies. Molecular studies have shown that among these, it is most similar to the other Philippine drongos - the Palawan drongo and the Balicassiao. It is differentiated from the other species by its short tail, smaller size and generally less glossy appearance.

=== Subspecies ===
Two subspecies are recognized:

- D.s. striatus – Found on Basilan and Mindanao
- D.s samarensis – Found on Bohol, Leyte Biliran and Samar; similar to nominate but shorter tail and less well marked spangles
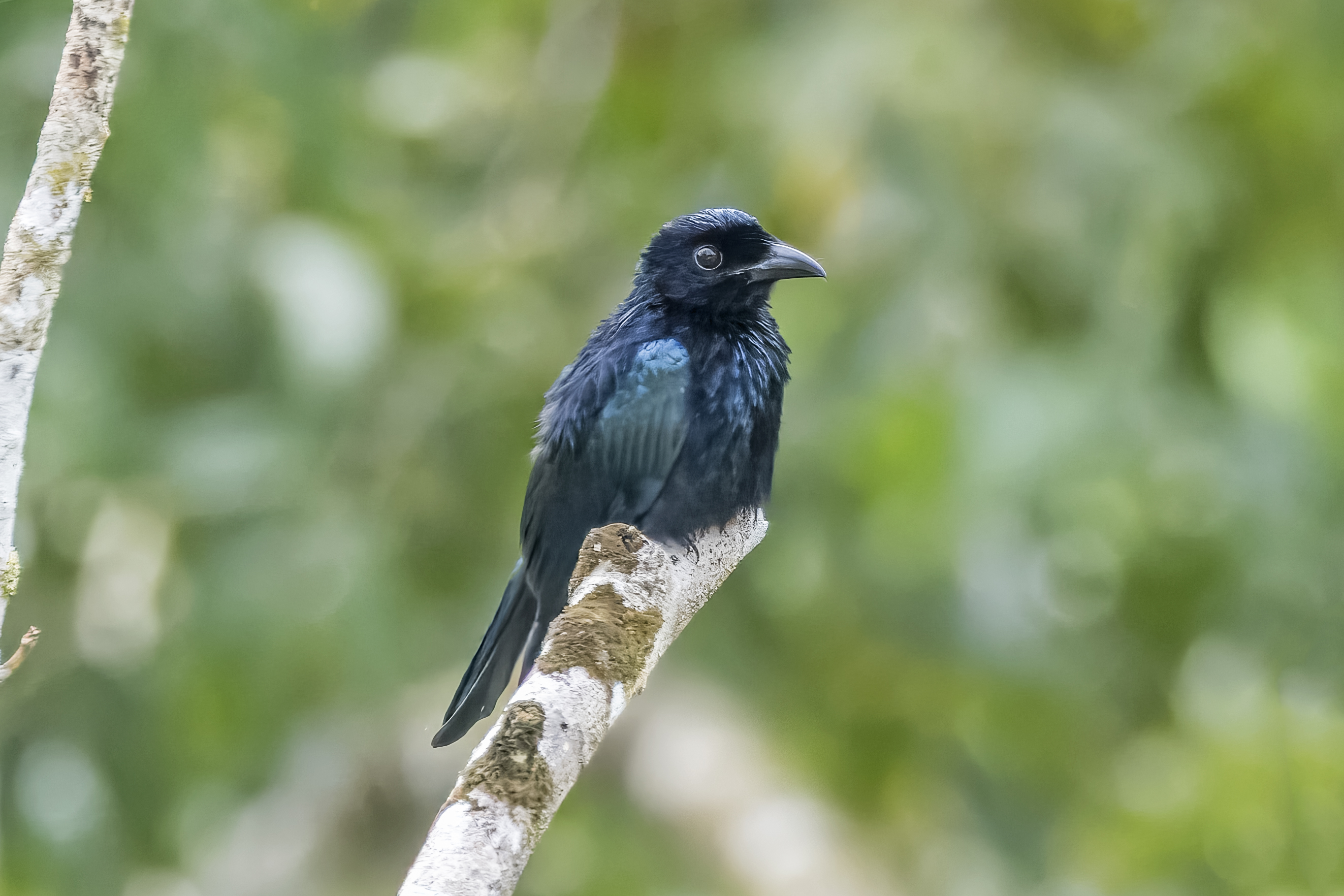
D. s. samarensis, Bohol

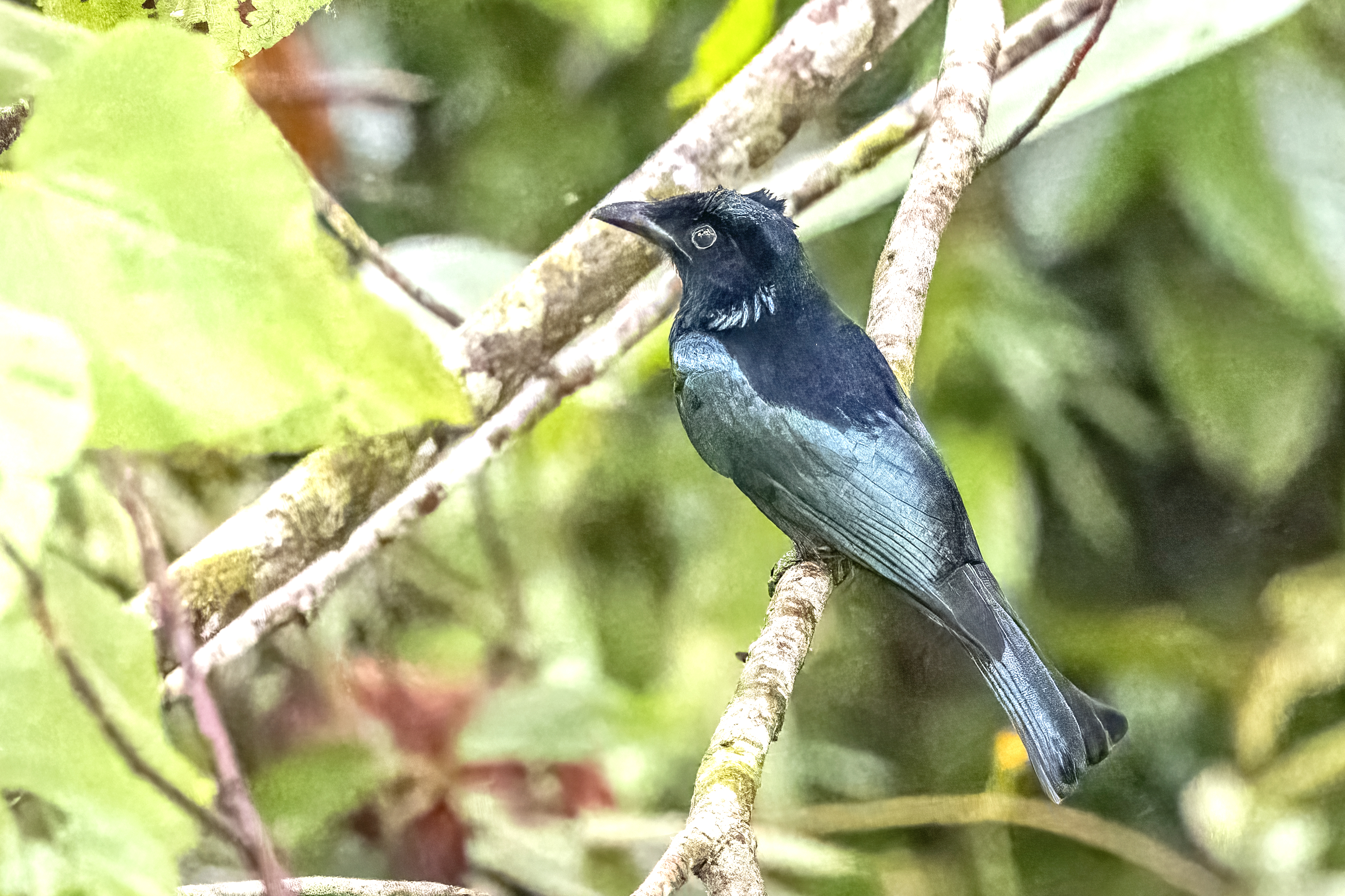
D. s. samarensis, Bohol
showing neck irridescence

== Behaviour and ecology ==
Diet mostly consists of insects but also known to supplement diet with nectar. Typically seen perching on a single conspicuous branch, where it flies of to catch insects and returns to the same perch. Also, forages by turning and searching leaves and flowers for insects. Forages alone or in small groups.

Poorly documents. Birds in breeding condition have been collected from February to May. A nest made of plant fibers found in March contained 3 whitish eggs with reddish brown spots. No other information about nesting and incubation has been published.

== Habitat and conservation status ==
It is found in tropical moist lowland forestup to 1,500 meters above sea level

IUCN has assessed this bird as least-concern species but populations are decreasing due to deforestation.

Occurs in a few protected areas like Pasonanca Natural Park, Mount Apo and Mount Kitanglad on Mindanao, Rajah Sikatuna Protected Landscape in Bohol and Samar Island Natural Park but actual protection and enforcement from illegal logging and hunting are lax
