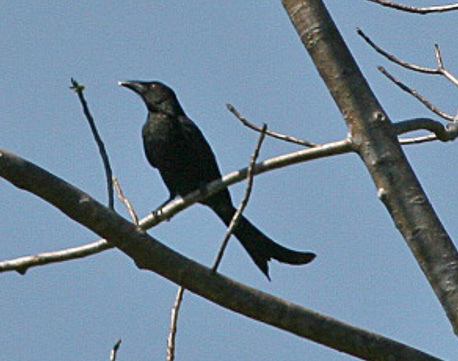

Conservation status
- Least Concern (IUCN 3.1)

Scientific classification
- Kingdom: Animalia
- Phylum: Chordata
- Class: Aves
- Order: Passeriformes
- Family: Dicruridae
- Genus: Dicrurus
- Species: D. densus

Binomial name
- Dicrurus densus (Bonaparte, 1850)

= Wallacean drongo =

Species of bird

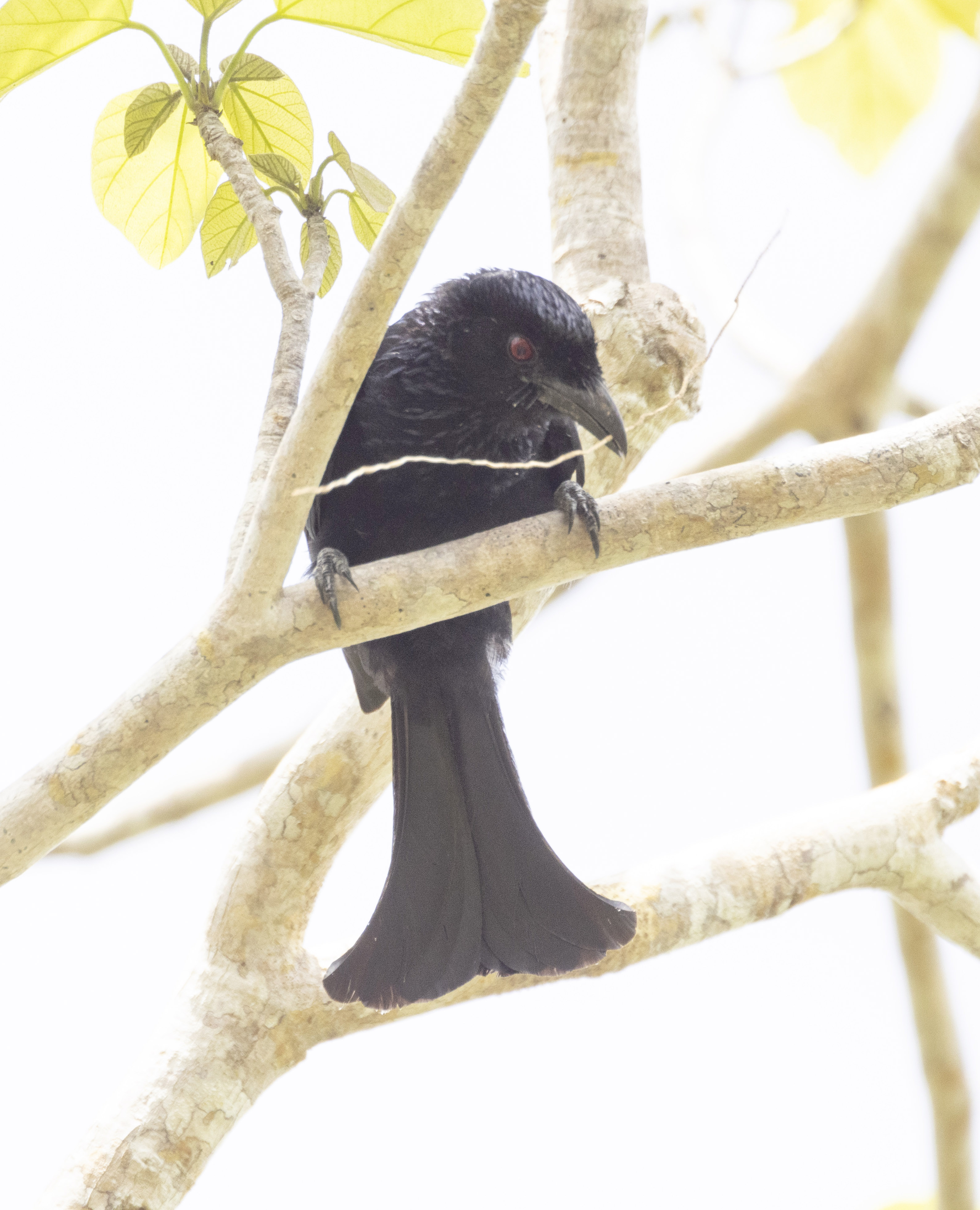
Wallacean Drongo on Komodo Island

The Wallacean drongo or Greater Wallacean drongo (Dicrurus densus) is a species of bird in the family Dicruridae. It can be found in the countries of Indonesia and East Timor. It was formerly considered to be conspecific with the hair-crested drongo (Dicrurus hottentottus).

Its natural habitats are subtropical or tropical moist lowland forests, subtropical or tropical mangrove forests, and subtropical or tropical moist montane forests.

== Conservation status ==
The Wallacean drongo has a very large range and does not approach the thresholds for Vulnerable under the range size criterion. Its extent of occurrence is greater than 20,000 km^{2}. The population trend is not known but it is not believed to be declining sufficiently rapidly, and the population size is believed to be large enough for it to not qualify as Vulnerable using the population size criterion. For these reasons the species is classified as Least Concern by the IUCN.

== Subspecies ==
The following six subspecies are recognized:

- D. densus densus (Bonaparte, 1850) Wallacean drongo
  - Roti, Timor, Wetar, and Sermata
- D. densus vicinus Rensch, 1928 Lesser Sunda drongo
  - Lombok, Lesser Sunda Islands
- D. densus bimaensis Wallace, 1864 Bima drongo
  - Sumbawa, Komodo, Rinca, Flores, Pantar, Alor, and Gunungapi
- D. densus sumbae Rensch, 1931 Sumba drongo
  - Sumba
- D. densus kuehni E. J. O. Hartert, 1901 Tanimbar drongo
  - Tanimbar Islands
- D. densus megalornis G. R. Gray, 1858 Moluccan drongo
  - Gorong, Watubela Is., and Kai Is., in southwest Moluccas
