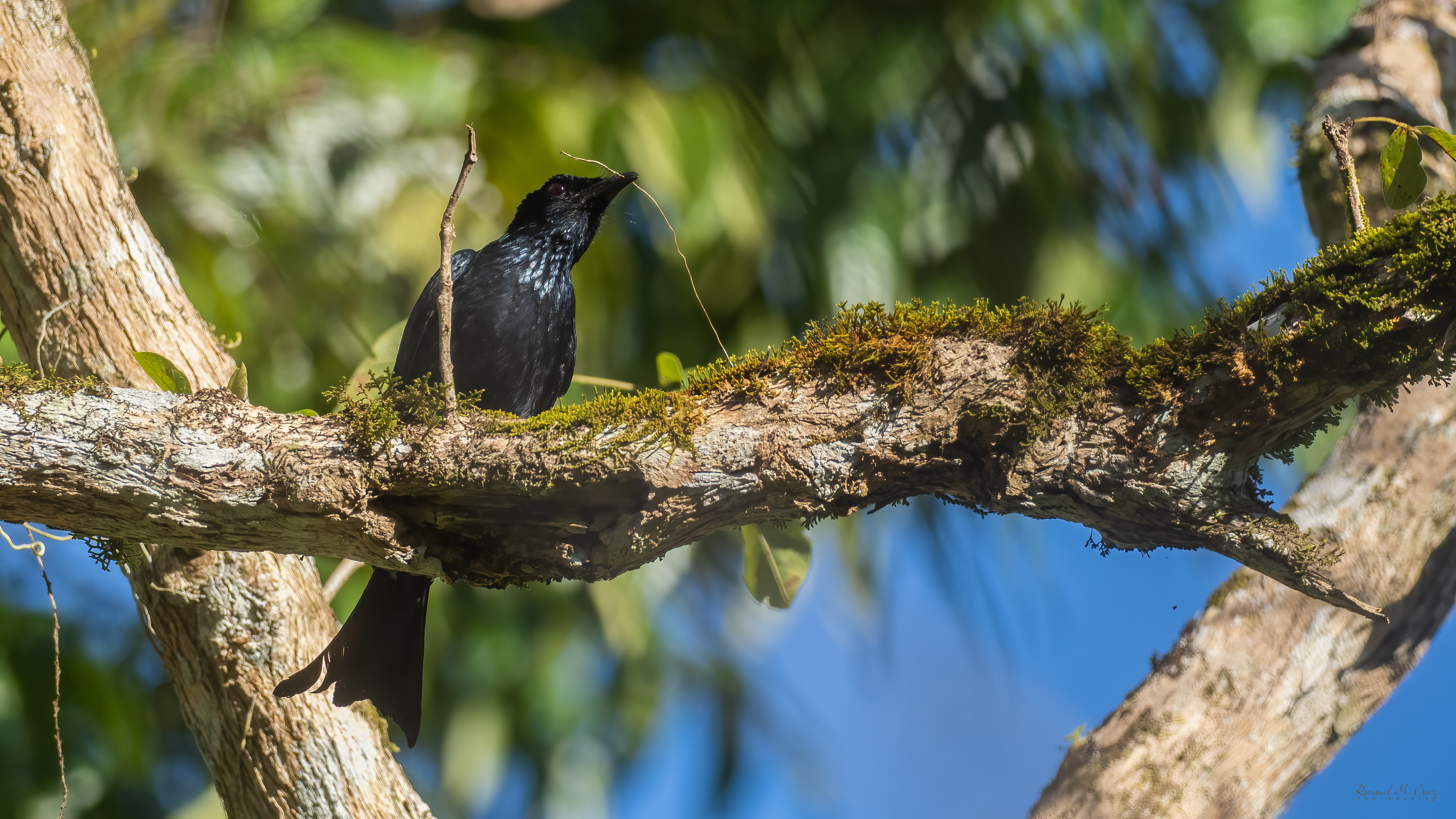

Conservation status
- Least Concern (IUCN 3.1)

Scientific classification
- Kingdom: Animalia
- Phylum: Chordata
- Class: Aves
- Order: Passeriformes
- Family: Dicruridae
- Genus: Dicrurus
- Species: D. palawanensis

Binomial name
- Dicrurus palawanensis Tweeddale, 1878

= Palawan drongo =

Species of bird

The Palawan drongo (Dicrurus palawanensis) is an Asian bird of the family Dicruridae. It was formerly considered conspecific with the hair-crested drongo. It is endemic to Palawan. It was formerly conspecific with the Hair-crested drongo but was designated as unique based on its different sounding call, physical differences and through molecular studies.

== Description and taxonomy ==
It was formerly conspecific with the Hair-crested drongo species complex which has now been split into 7 different subspecies. Molecular studies have shown that among these, it's most similar to the other Philippine drongos - the Short-tailed drongo and the Balicassiao

=== Subspecies ===
Two subspecies are recognized:

- D. p.palawanensis Tweeddale, A, 1878 – Found on Palawan, Busuanga, Culion, Balabac Island and Cagayancillo
- D. p. cuyensis (McGregor, RC, 1903) – Found on Semirara Island and Cuyo ; Glossier and slightly larger than nominate

== Behaviour and ecology ==
Not much is known about its diet but it is presumed to be the typical drongo diet of nectar and insects.

It is also presumed to have similar habits to the Hair-crested drongo which lays 3-4 eggs.

== Habitat and conservation status ==
Its habitat is primary lowland forest, second growth and thick scrub up to 1,500 meters above sea level.

It is assessed as least-concern species under the International Union for Conservation of Nature with the population decreasing. Palawan's forests are under threat due to illegal logging, deforestation, land conversion and mining. The whole of Palawan was designated as a Biosphere Reserve; however, protection and enforcement of laws has been difficult and these threats still continue. It occurs in just one protected area in the Iwahig Prison and Penal Farm.
