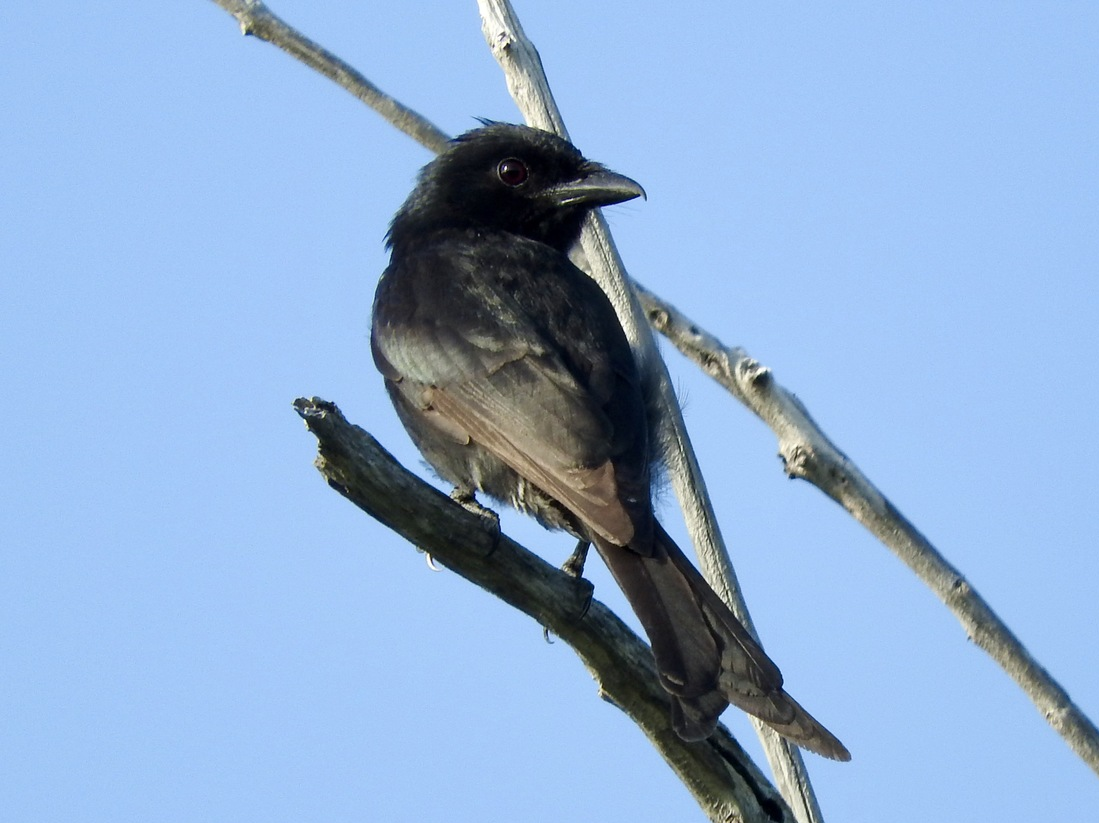
- Aldabra drongo in Outer Islands, Seychelles

Conservation status
- Near Threatened (IUCN 3.1)

Scientific classification
- Kingdom: Animalia
- Phylum: Chordata
- Class: Aves
- Order: Passeriformes
- Family: Dicruridae
- Genus: Dicrurus
- Species: D. aldabranus

Binomial name
- Dicrurus aldabranus (Ridgway, 1893)

= Aldabra drongo =

Species of bird

The Aldabra drongo (Dicrurus aldabranus) is a species of bird in the drongo family Dicruridae. It is endemic to Seychelles, where it occurs only on the island of Aldabra. It has a small population of only around 1000 birds.

The appearance of this species is typical for drongos, with entirely black plumage, a heavy bill and a red eye. The tail is long and forked. Juvenile birds have a grey back, lighter blotched undersides and a brown eye. Its call is a harsh chuckle.

Its natural habitats are tropical mangrove forests and casuarina woodland and dense scrub.

== Taxonomy ==
The Aldabra drongo was first described by Robert Ridgway in 1893. The closest relative to the Adabra drongo is the crested drongo.

== Distribution and habitat ==
The Aldabra drongo is endemic to the Aldabra atoll in the southwest Seychelles. On these islands, it is found in wooded areas of dense scrub. It can also be found in coastal casuarina forest and mangroves, where it typically builds it's nests.

== Behaviour ==
The Aldabra drongo feeds primarily on insects and small geckos and lizards. When hunting insects, it will perch on a branch and catch the insects in mid-air. It may feed on the ground, however this behaviour is usually seen by juveniles who are unskilled in mid-air hunting.

It is known for being a highly vocal bird, with a wide variety of calls. These calls appear to server a variety of communication needs, including a musical duet sung between male and female during mating, and an alarm call described as "ti-ti-you caw caw".
