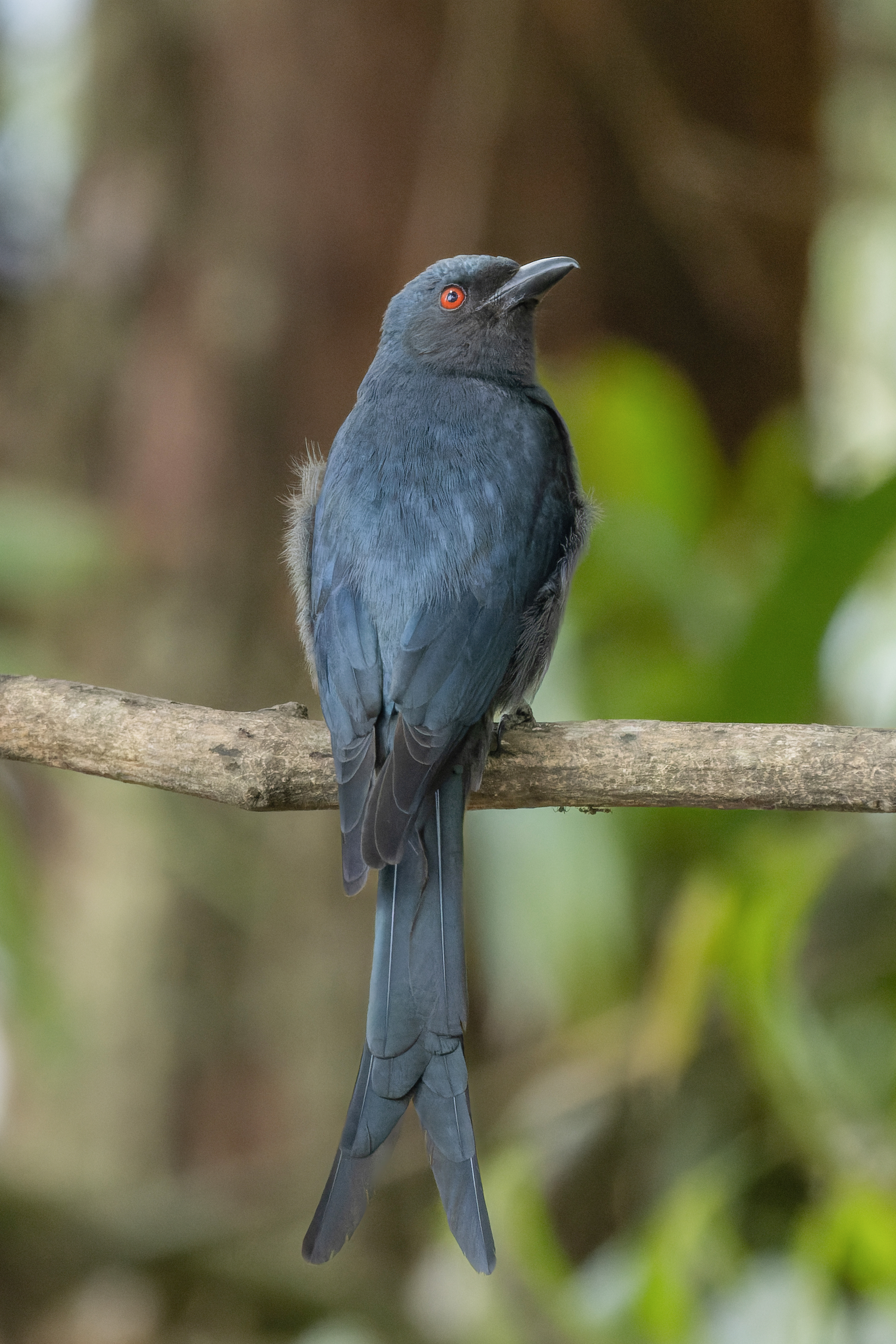
- Dicrurus leucophaeus in Latpanchar (Darjeeling), West Bengal, India.

Conservation status
- Least Concern (IUCN 3.1)

Scientific classification
- Kingdom: Animalia
- Phylum: Chordata
- Class: Aves
- Order: Passeriformes
- Family: Dicruridae
- Genus: Dicrurus
- Species: D. leucophaeus

Binomial name
- Dicrurus leucophaeus Vieillot, 1817
- Breeding ranges of the various races according to Vaurie, note that some subspecies are no longer considered valid

= Ashy drongo =

Species of bird

The ashy drongo (Dicrurus leucophaeus) is a species of bird in the drongo family Dicruridae. It is found widely distributed across eastern and Southeast Asia, with several populations that vary in the shade of grey, migration patterns and in the size or presence of white patches around the eye.

== Description ==
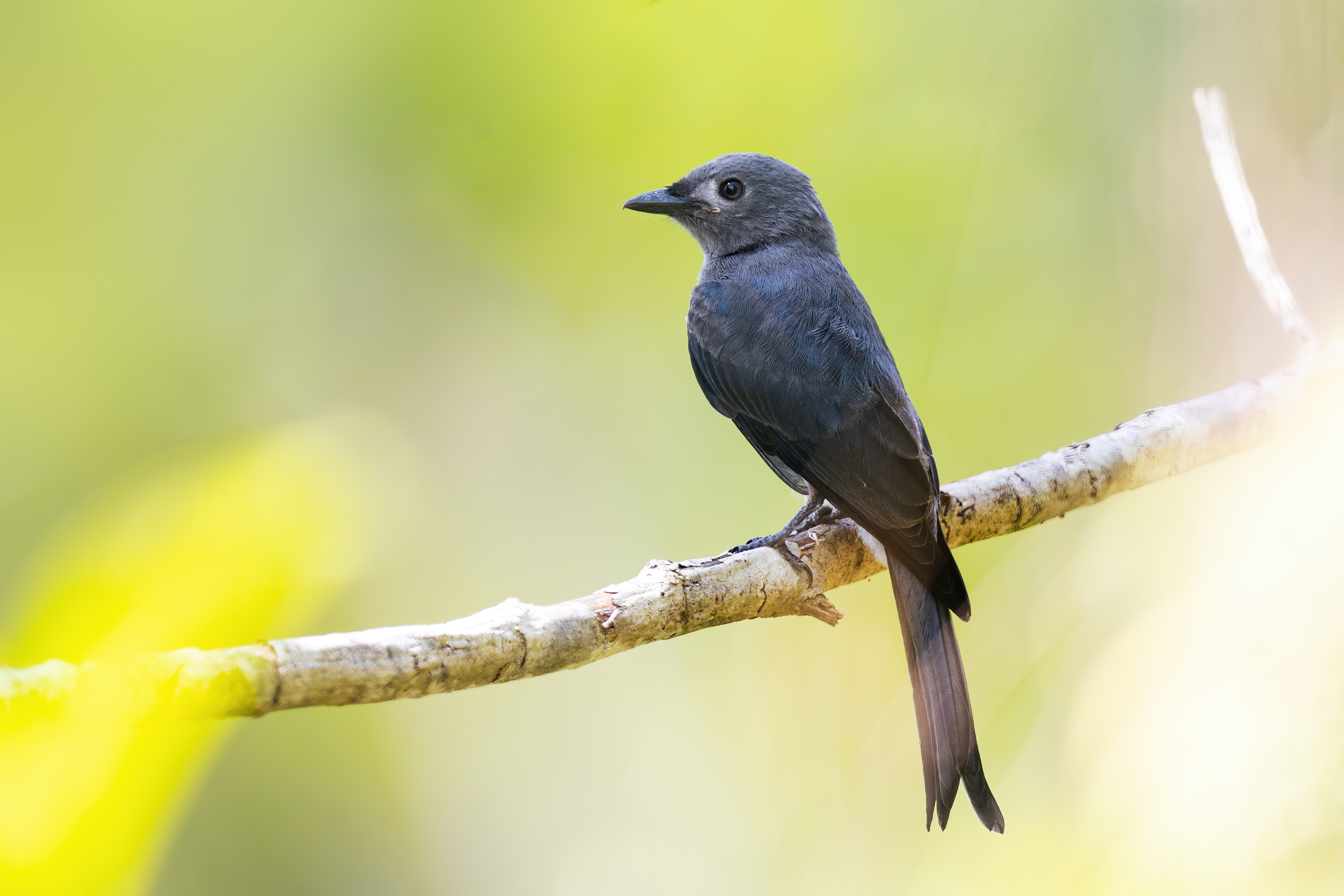
in Sarawak, Malaysia

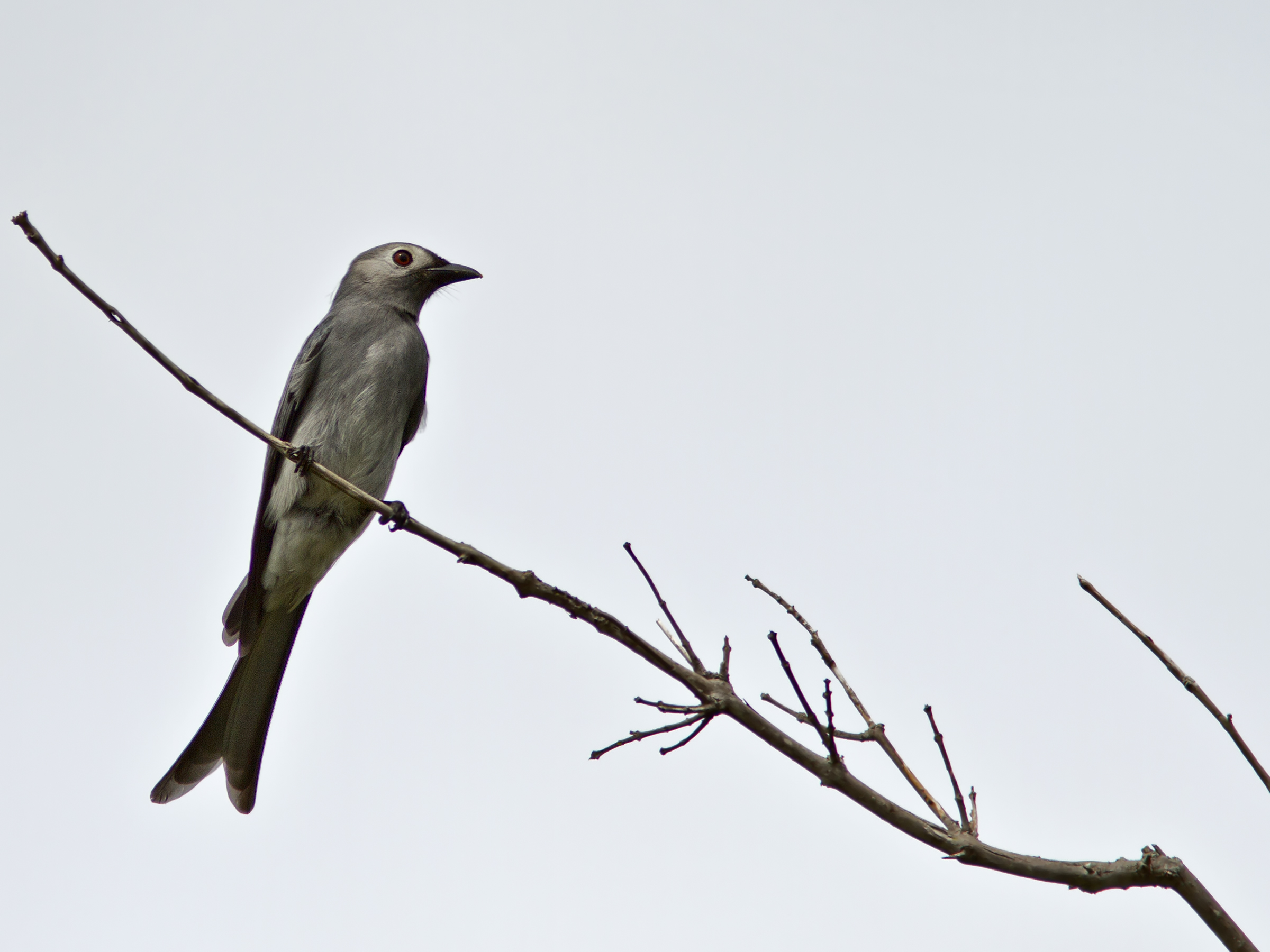
Subspecies salangensis from Thailand

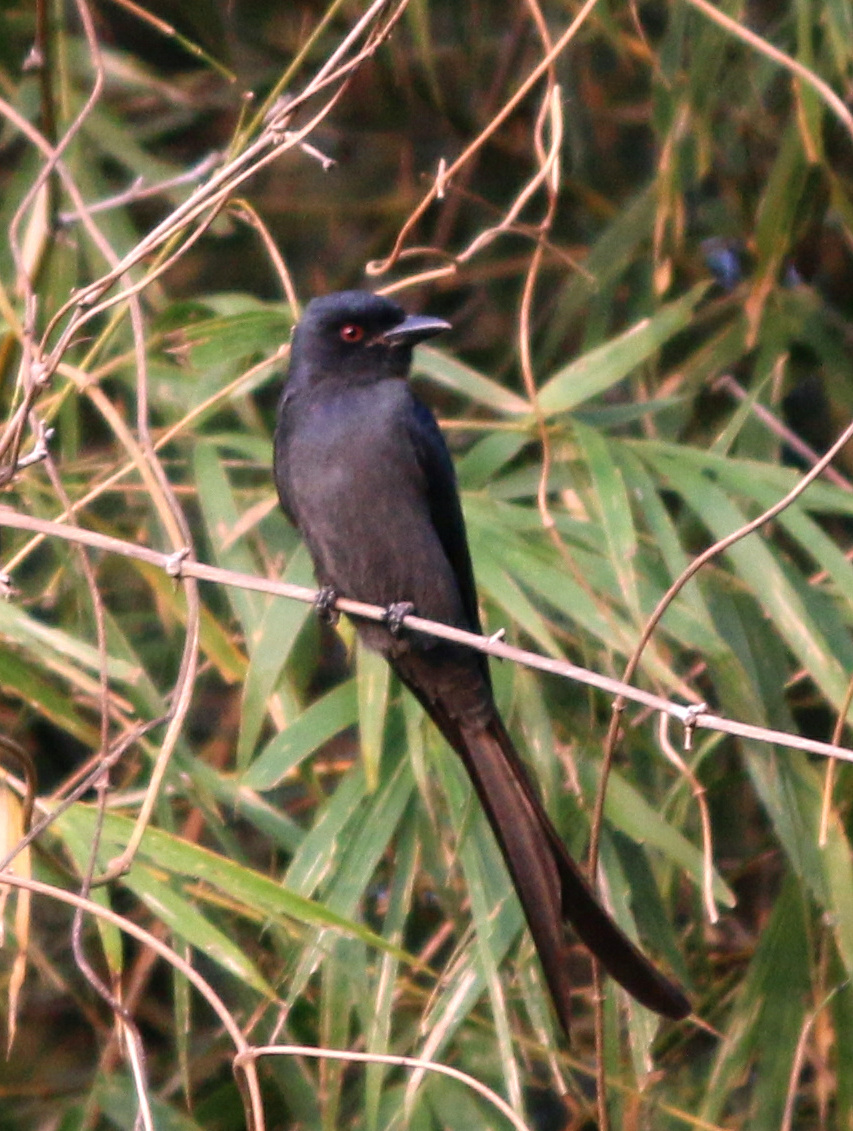
Front view

The adult ashy drongo is mainly dark grey, and the tail is long and deeply forked, There are a number of subspecies varying in the shade of the grey plumage. Some subspecies have white markings on the head. Young birds are dull brownish grey.

Subspecies longicaudatus of India (which includes beavani of the Himalayas that winters on the peninsula, with one breeding population in central India that Vaurie separates as longicaudatus in the restricted sense) is very dark and almost like the black drongo although this bird is slimmer and has a somewhat longer and less-splayed tail. It is found in more tall forest habitat, has dark grey underside lacking the sheen of black drongo. The iris is crimson and there is no white rictal spot. Subspecies leucogenis and salangensis have a white eye-patch as do several of the island forms that breed further south. The calls are a little more nasal and twangy than that of the black drongo.

== Distribution ==
The ashy drongo breeds in the hills of tropical southern Asia from eastern Afghanistan east to southern China, Ryukyu Islands in southern Japan (particularly Okinawa) and Indonesia. Many populations in the northern part of its range are migratory. Charles Vaurie described subspecies beavani (after Robert Cecil Beavan) as the population that breeds along the Himalayas that wintered in peninsular India. However, later workers include this as part of longicaudatus which also has a population that breeds in central India. In winter, the species is particularly fond of hill forests. E. C. Stuart Baker described stevensi which Vaurie considered as being either beavani or hopwoodi of the eastern Himalayas. To the east of the range of hopwoodi is mouhouti of Thailand and Myanmar. To the north of this range are leucogenis and salangensis (both migratory mainly to areas further south but also known from Nagaland) while bondi is found to the south. Along the southeast Asian island chain, there are number of insular populations including periophthalmus, ryukyuensis, batakensis, phaedrus, siberu and nigrescens. The nominate form is said to be found on Simalur, Java, Bali, Lombok, Palawan, and Balabac Islands.

== Behaviour and ecology ==
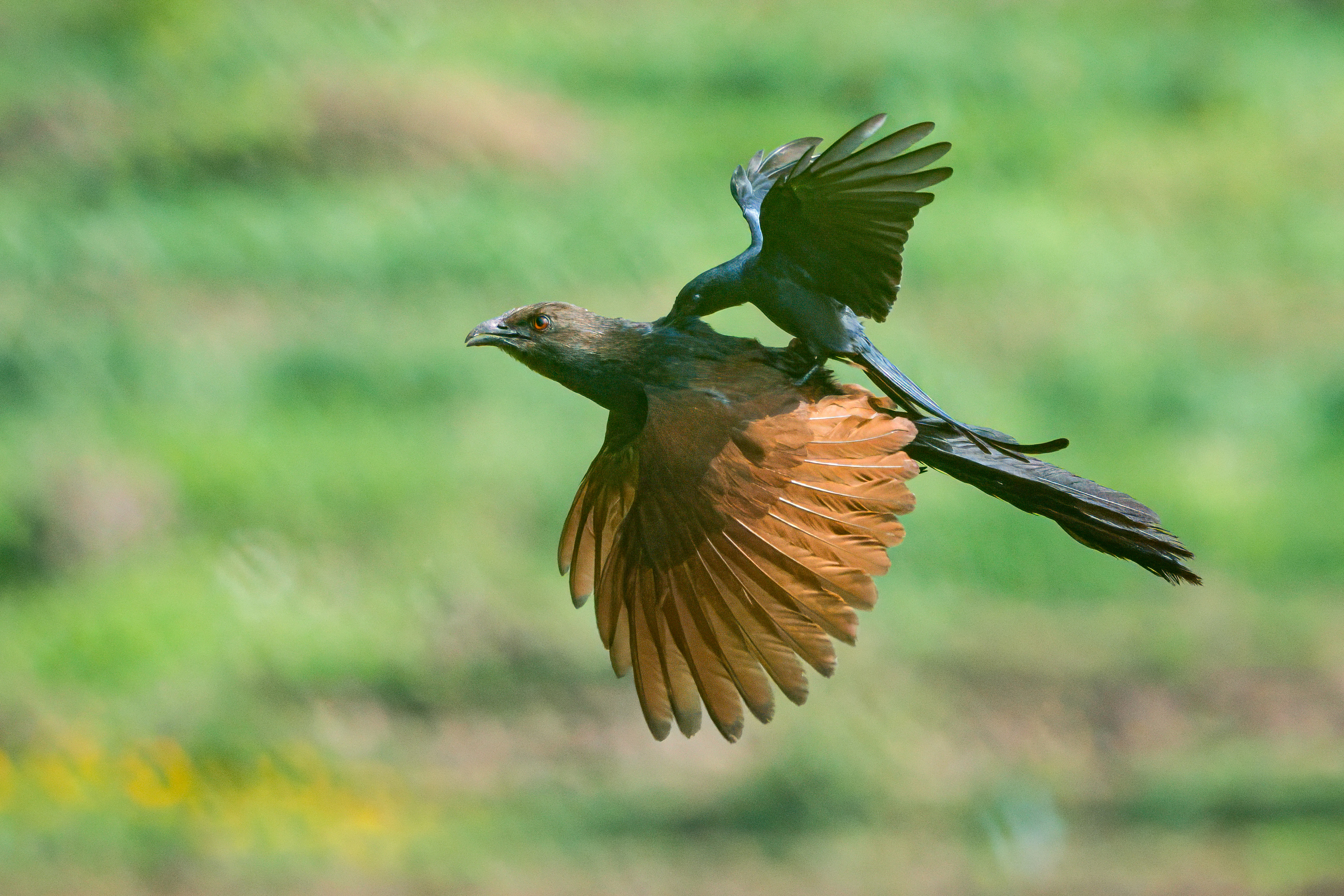
Ashy drongo biting greater coucal in flight.

The ashy drongo has short legs and sits very upright while perched prominently, often high on a tree. It is insectivorous and forages by making aerial sallies but sometimes gleans from tree trunks. They are found singly, in pairs or small groups. During migration they fly in small flocks.

A common call that they make is described as drangh gip or gip-gip-drangh. They can imitate the calls of other birds and are capable of imitating the whistling notes of a common iora.

The breeding season is May to June with a clutch of three or four reddish or brown eggs laid in a loose cup nest in a tree.
