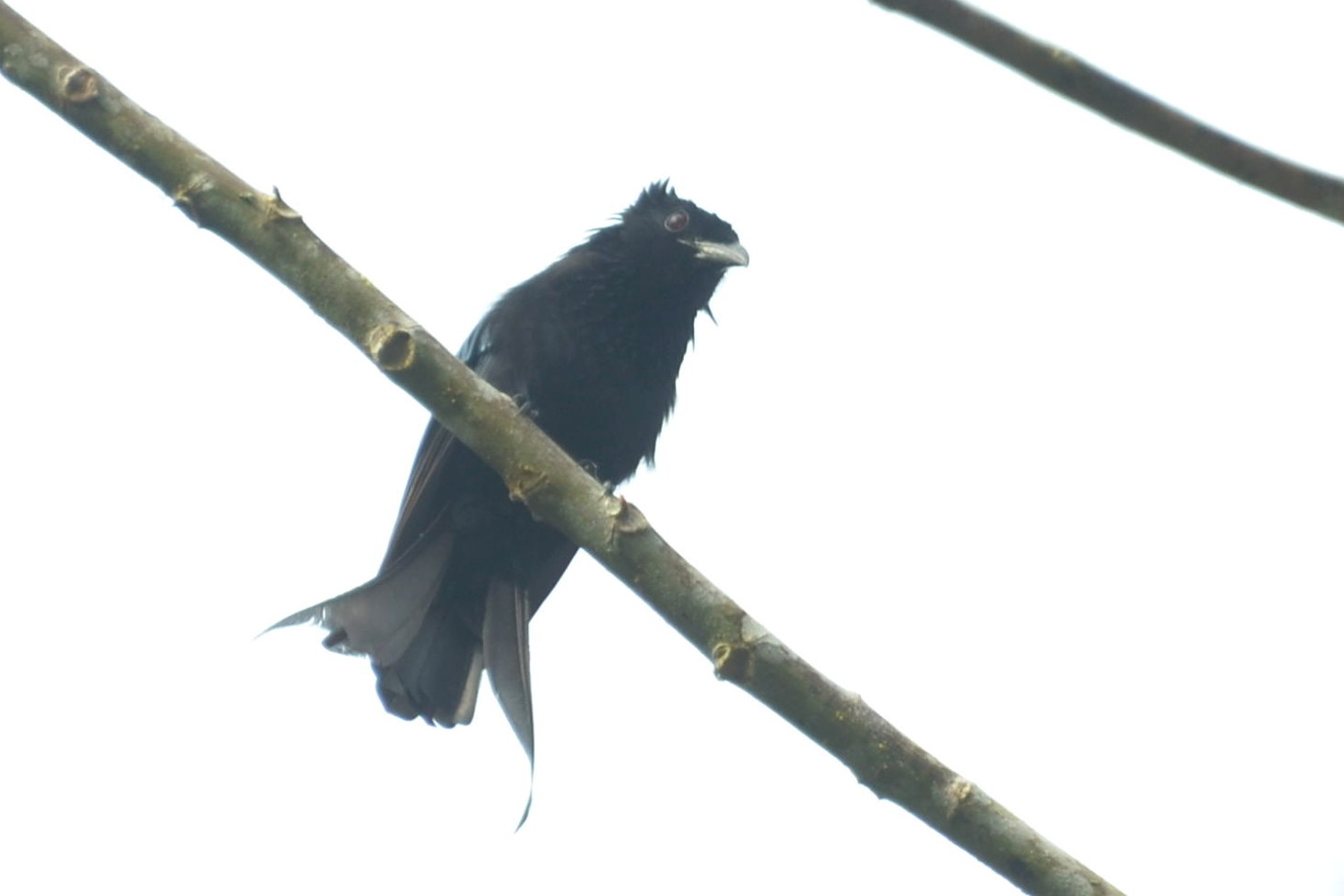

Conservation status
- Least Concern (IUCN 3.1)

Scientific classification
- Kingdom: Animalia
- Phylum: Chordata
- Class: Aves
- Order: Passeriformes
- Family: Dicruridae
- Genus: Dicrurus
- Species: D. montanus

Binomial name
- Dicrurus montanus (Riley, 1919)

Audio

= Sulawesi drongo =

Species of bird

The Sulawesi drongo (Dicrurus montanus) is a species of bird in the family Dicruridae. It is endemic to Sulawesi in Indonesia. Its natural habitats are subtropical or tropical moist lowland forests and subtropical or tropical moist montane forests.
