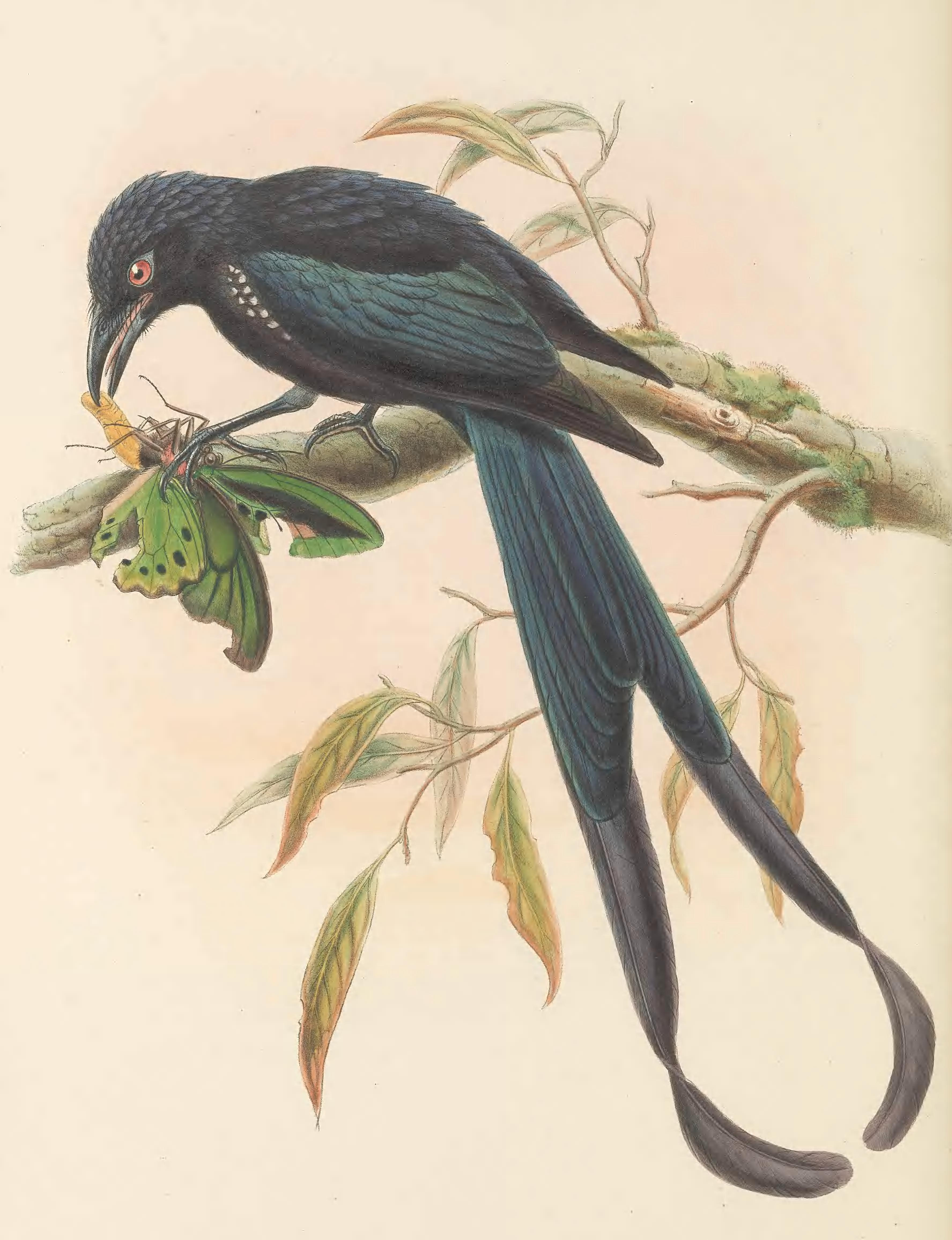
- Illustration by John Gould and W. Hart

Conservation status
- Near Threatened (IUCN 3.1)

Scientific classification
- Kingdom: Animalia
- Phylum: Chordata
- Class: Aves
- Order: Passeriformes
- Family: Dicruridae
- Genus: Dicrurus
- Species: D. megarhynchus

Binomial name
- Dicrurus megarhynchus (Quoy & Gaimard, 1832)

= Paradise drongo =

Species of bird

The paradise drongo or ribbon-tailed drongo (Dicrurus megarhynchus) is a species of bird in the family Dicruridae. It is endemic to New Ireland in the Bismarck Archipelago, Papua New Guinea. With a total length of 51 to 63 cm (20 to 25 in) and body mass of 130 g (4.6 oz), this may be the largest species of drongo.

== Taxonomy ==
The paradise drongo was described by the French zoologists Jean Quoy and Joseph Gaimard in 1832 from a specimen that they believed had been collected in Dorey (now Manokwari) in New Guinea. They coined the binomial name, Edolius megarhynchus. (Note: Although the ornithological part of the Voyage de la corvette l'Astrolabe has 1830 on the title page it was not published until 1832.) The English zoologist Philip Sclater pointed out in 1877 that the location reported by Quoy and Gaimard was probably an error. Specimens had been collected from New Ireland in the Bismarck Archipelago but none had been obtained from New Guinea. The type locality is now designated as Port Praslin near the southern point of New Ireland.
