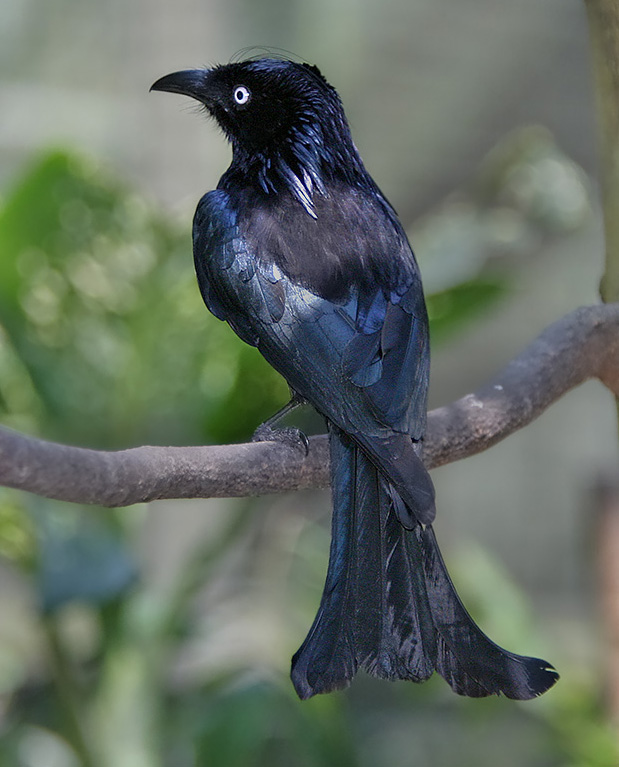
- Hair-crested drongo (D. hottentottus striatus)

Scientific classification
- Kingdom: Animalia
- Phylum: Chordata
- Class: Aves
- Order: Passeriformes
- Superfamily: Corvoidea
- Family: Dicruridae; Vigors, 1825
- Genus: Dicrurus; Vieillot, 1816

Type species
- Corvus balicassius (Balicassiao) Linnaeus, 1766

= Drongo =

Family of birds

Dicrurus phylogeny

- Dicruridae
  - aeneus
  - - - - paradiseus
        - annectens
      - - - megarhynchus
          - bracteatus
        - - hottentotus
          - balicassius
    - remifer
  - - - - waldenii
        - - aldabranus
          - forficatus
      - - - - adsimilis
            - macrocercus
          - modestus
        - - fuscipennis
      - - leucophaeus
    - - atripennis
      - ludwigii

Cladogram based on a study by Eric Pasquet and colleagues published in 2007

A drongo is a member of the family Dicruridae of passerine birds of the Old World tropics. The 28 species in the family are placed in a single genus, Dicrurus.

Drongos are mostly black or dark grey, short-legged birds, with an upright stance when perched. They have forked tails and some have elaborate tail decorations. They feed on insects and small birds, which they catch in flight or on the ground. Some species are accomplished mimics and have a variety of alarm calls, to which other birds and animals often respond. They are known to utter fake alarm calls that scare other animals off food, which the drongo then claims.

== Taxonomy ==
The genus Dicrurus was introduced by French ornithologist Louis Pierre Vieillot for the drongos in 1816. The type species was subsequently designated as the balicassiao (Dicrurus balicassius) by English zoologist George Robert Gray in 1841. The name of the genus combines the Ancient Greek words dikros "forked" and oura "tail". "Drongo" is originally from the indigenous language of Madagascar, where it refers to the crested drongo; it is now used for all members of the family.

This family now includes only the genus Dicrurus, although Christidis and Boles (2007) expanded the family to include the subfamilies Rhipidurinae (Australasian fantails), Monarchinae (monarch and paradise flycatchers), and Grallininae (magpie larks).

The family was formerly treated as having two genera, Chaetorhynchus and Dicrurus. The genus Chaetorhynchus contains a single species, the New Guinea–endemic C. papuensis. On the basis of both morphological and genetic differences, it is now placed with the fantails (Rhipiduridae) and renamed from the pygmy drongo to the drongo fantail.

The genus Dicrurus contains 28 species:

Image	Common name	Scientific name	Distribution
	Square-tailed drongo	Dicrurus ludwigii	southern Africa
	Sharpe's drongo	Dicrurus sharpei	southern South Sudan and western Kenya to the Democratic Republic of the Congo to Nigeria
	Shining drongo	Dicrurus atripennis	Cameroon, Central African Republic, Republic of the Congo, Democratic Republic of the Congo, Ivory Coast, Equatorial Guinea, Gabon, Ghana, Guinea, Liberia, Nigeria, Sierra Leone, and Togo
	Fork-tailed drongo	Dicrurus adsimilis	Gabon, Congo Republic, DRC, Angola, northwestern Zambia, Namibia, Botswana and northwestern South Africa
	Velvet-mantled drongo	Dicrurus modestus	Nigeria and Cameroon to the Democratic Republic of Congo and Angola
	Grande Comore drongo	Dicrurus fuscipennis	Comoros
	Aldabra drongo	Dicrurus aldabranus	Seychelles
	Crested drongo	Dicrurus forficatus	Madagascar and Comoros
	Mayotte drongo	Dicrurus waldenii	Mayotte
	Black drongo	Dicrurus macrocercus	Iran through Pakistan, India, Bangladesh and Sri Lanka east to southern China and Indonesia and accidental visitor of Japan
	Ashy drongo	Dicrurus leucophaeus	eastern Afghanistan east to southern China, Ryukyu Islands in southern Japan (particularly Okinawa) and Indonesia
	White-bellied drongo	Dicrurus caerulescens	India and Sri Lanka
	Crow-billed drongo	Dicrurus annectens	Bangladesh, Bhutan, Brunei, Cambodia, China, India, Indonesia, Laos, Malaysia, Myanmar, Nepal, Philippines, Singapore, Thailand, and Vietnam
	Bronzed drongo	Dicrurus aeneus	western Uttaranchal eastwards into Indochina and Hainan, the Malay Peninsula, Sumatra and northern Borneo
	Lesser racket-tailed drongo	Dicrurus remifer	Bangladesh, Bhutan, Cambodia, India, Indonesia, Laos, Malaysia, Myanmar, Nepal, Thailand, and Vietnam
	Balicassiao	Dicrurus balicassius	Philippines
	Short-tailed drongo	Dicrurus striatus	Philippines
	Hair-crested drongo	Dicrurus hottentottus	Bangladesh, India, and Bhutan through Indochina to China, Indonesia, and Brunei
	Tablas drongo	Dicrurus menagei	Philippines
	Palawan drongo	Dicrurus palawanensis	Palawan
	Sumatran drongo	Dicrurus sumatranus	Sumatra in Indonesia
	Wallacean drongo	Dicrurus densus	Indonesia and East Timor
	Sulawesi drongo	Dicrurus montanus	Sulawesi in Indonesia
	Spangled drongo	Dicrurus bracteatus	Australia, New Guinea, Indonesia
	Paradise drongo	Dicrurus megarhynchus	New Ireland in the Bismarck Archipelago, Papua New Guinea
	Andaman drongo	Dicrurus andamanensis	Andaman Islands
	Greater racket-tailed drongo	Dicrurus paradiseus	India to Borneo and Java
	Sri Lanka drongo	Dicrurus lophorinus	Sri Lanka

The family Dicruridae is most likely of Indo-Malayan origin, with a colonization of Africa about 15 million years ago (Mya). Dispersal across the Wallace Line into Australasia is estimated to have been more recent, around 6 Mya.

== Characteristics ==
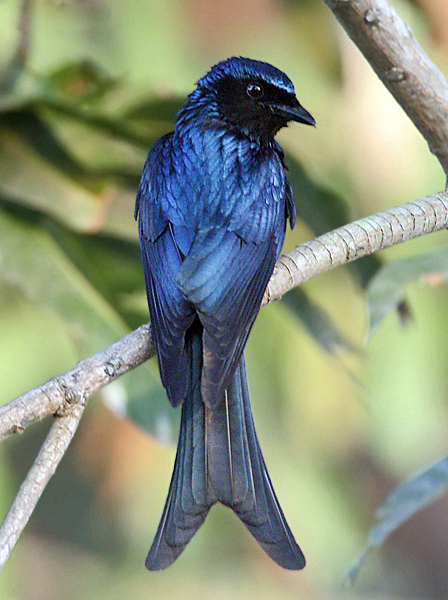
Bronzed drongo (Dicrurus aeneus) in India

These insectivorous birds are usually found in open forests or bush. Most are black or dark grey in colour, sometimes with metallic tints. They have long, forked tails; some Asian species have elaborate tail decorations. They have short legs and sit very upright whilst perched, like a shrike. They flycatch or take prey from the ground. Some drongos, especially the greater racket-tailed drongo, are noted for their ability to mimic other birds and even mammals.

Two to four eggs are laid in a nest high in a tree. Despite their small size, they are aggressive and fearless, and will attack much larger species if their nests or young are threatened.

Several species of animals and birds respond to drongos' alarm calls, which often warn of the presence of a predator. Fork-tailed drongos in the Kalahari Desert use alarm calls in the absence of a predator to cause animals to flee and abandon food, which they eat, getting up to 23% of their food this way. They not only use their own alarm calls, but also imitate those of many species, either their victim's or that of another species to which the victim responds. If the call of one species is not effective, perhaps because of habituation, the drongo may try another; 51 different calls are known to be imitated. In one test on pied babblers, the babbler ignored an alarm call repeated three times when no danger was present, but continued to respond to different calls. Researchers have considered the possibility that these drongos possess theory of mind, not fully shown in any animal other than humans.

== Culture ==
The word "drongo" is used in Australian English as a mild form of insult meaning "idiot" or "stupid fellow". This usage derives from an Australian racehorse of the same name (Drongo) (apparently after the spangled drongo, D. bracteatus) in the 1920s that never won despite many places. The word also has been frequently used among friends and can be used in a casual or serious tone.

== Gallery ==
A greater racket-tailed drongo preening at Khao Yai National Park, Thailand

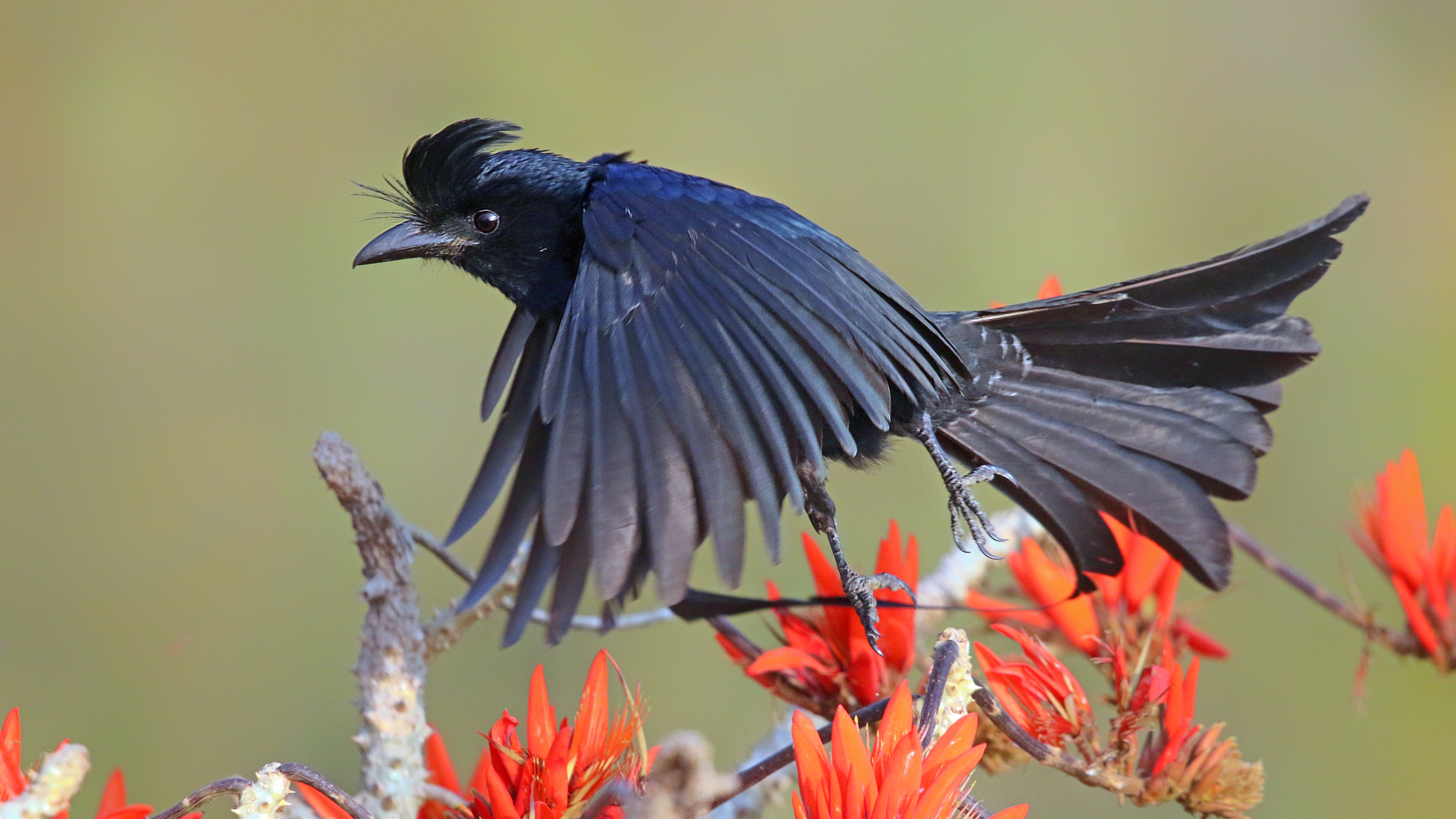
A greater racket-tailed drongo visiting Erythrina flowers at Satchari National Park in Bangladesh

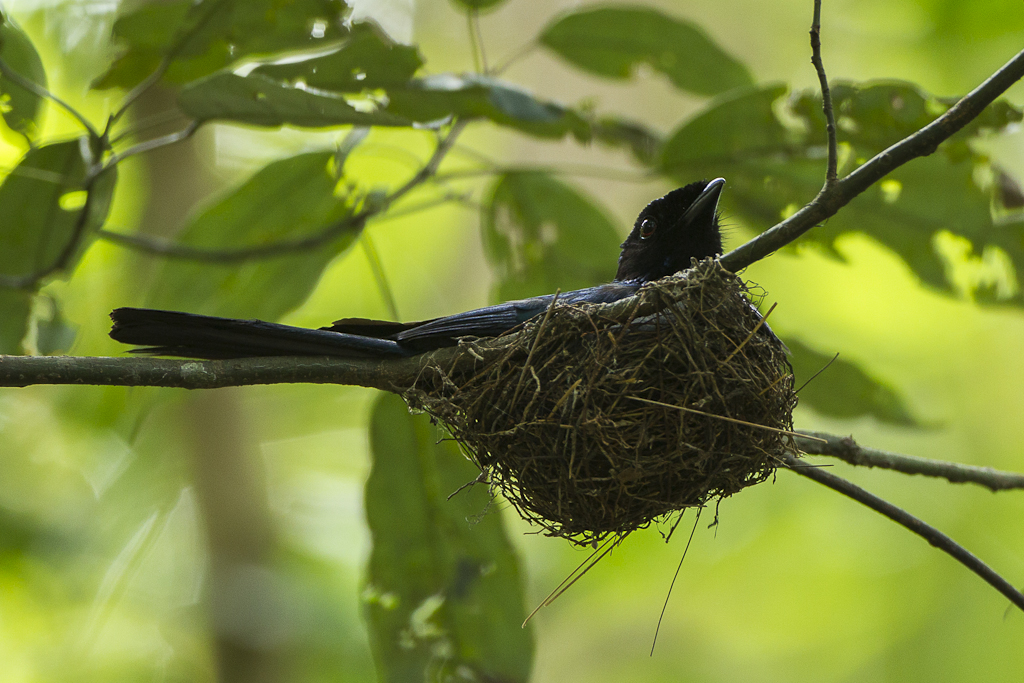
A lesser racket-tailed drongo incubating at Kaeng Krachan National Park in Thailand
