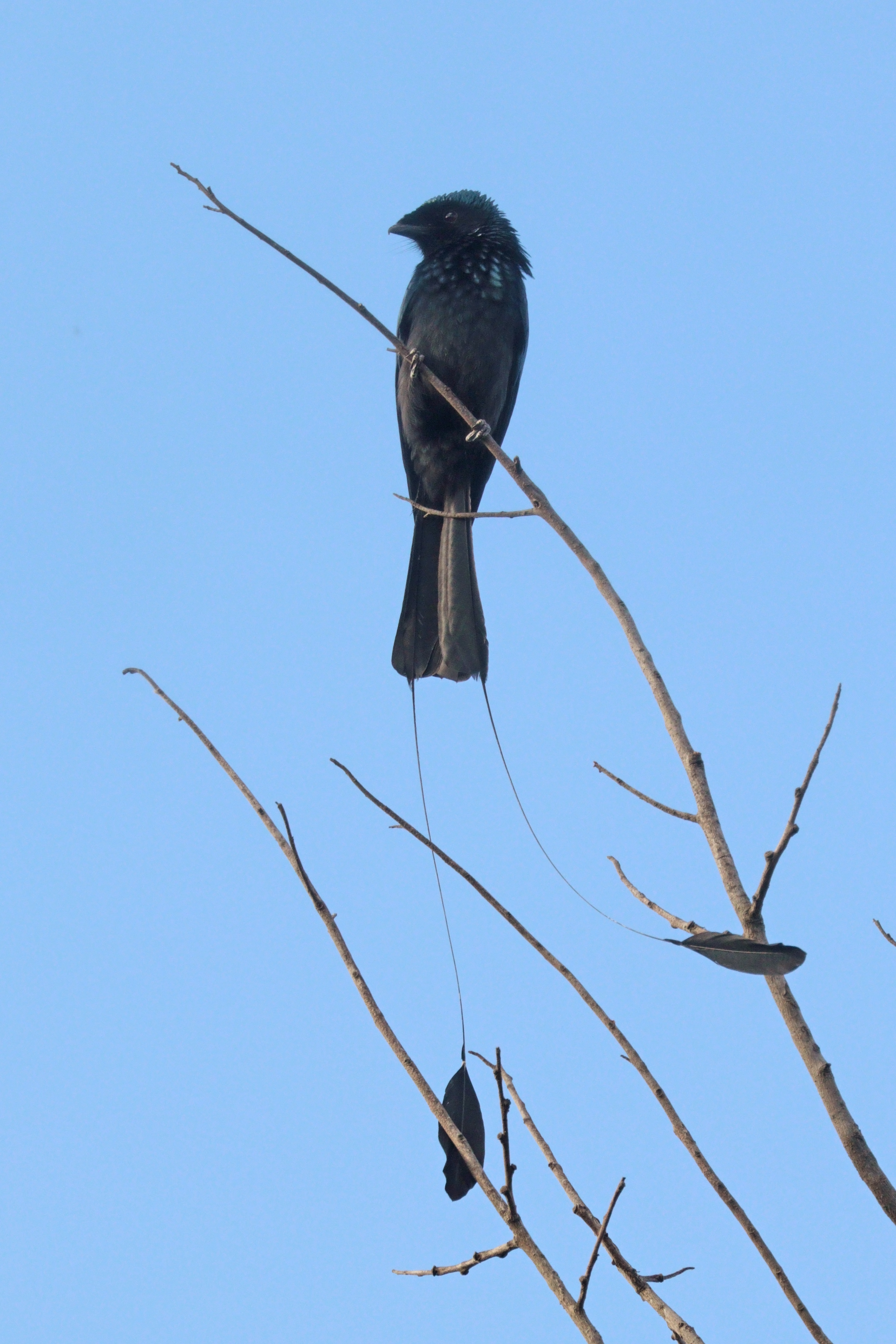
- D. r. tectirostris Pokhara, Nepal

Conservation status
- Least Concern (IUCN 3.1)

Scientific classification
- Kingdom: Animalia
- Phylum: Chordata
- Class: Aves
- Order: Passeriformes
- Family: Dicruridae
- Genus: Dicrurus
- Species: D. remifer

Binomial name
- Dicrurus remifer (Temminck, 1823)

= Lesser racket-tailed drongo =

Species of bird

The lesser racket-tailed drongo (Dicrurus remifer) is a species of bird in the family Dicruridae. It is found in the Indian subcontinent and Southeast Asia.

It is found in the Indian subcontinent and Southeast Asia, ranging across Bangladesh, Bhutan, Cambodia, India, Indonesia, Laos, Malaysia, Myanmar, Nepal, Thailand, and Vietnam. Its natural habitat is near the edge or inside of subtropical or tropical moist montane forests.

== Description ==
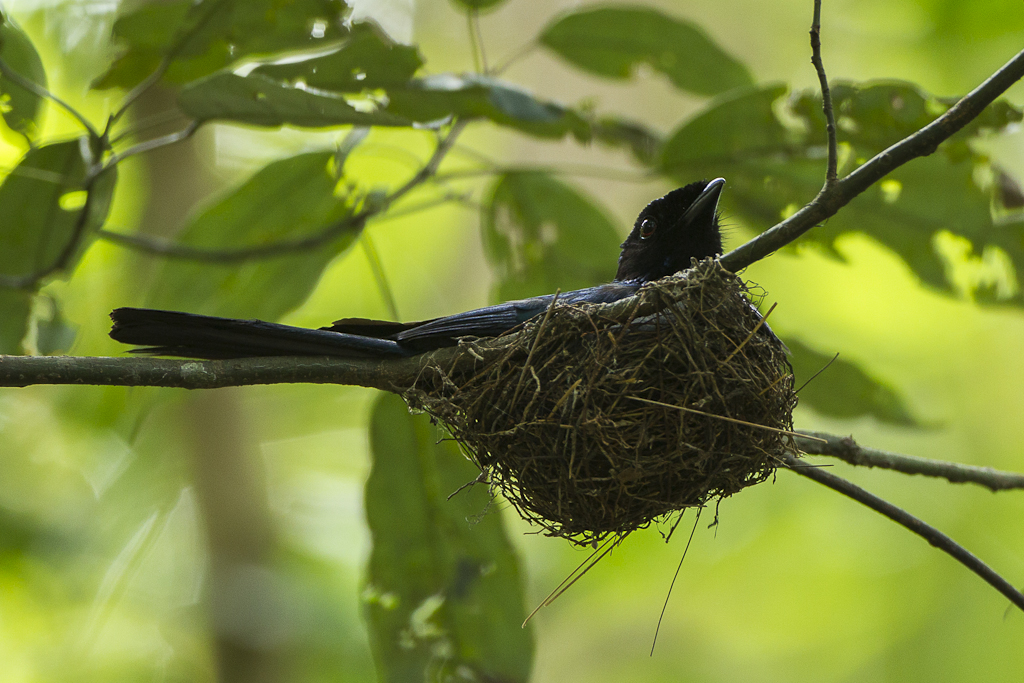
Incubating bird at Kaeng Krachan National Park in Thailand

The drongo is about 25–27.5 cm long, excluding outermost tail feathers (c. 30–40 cm to end of tail); average weight of males is between 39–49 grams while females are between 35.5–44 grams. Its feathers are black with a bluish metallic gloss. The ends of its tail have long shafts more than 50 centimetres (20 in).

It can be confused with the greater racket-tailed drongo, but the former doesn't have a crest on its head and its tail is square cut.

== Taxonomy ==
There are 4 recognised subspecies of lesser racket-tailed drongo:

- D. r. tectirostris (Hodgson, 1836) – lower Himalayas from N India (Uttarakhand) E to Arunachal Pradesh, Assam, Nagaland, Manipur and Mizoram, NE Bangladesh, S China (SE Xizang, W & S Yunnan and SW Guangxi), Myanmar (except extreme S), N Thailand, N Laos and N Vietnam (S to Huê).
- D. r. peracensis (E. C. S. Baker, 1918) – S Myanmar (Tenasserim) and SW & S Thailand S to N Peninsular Malaysia (S Selangor and S Pahang), S Laos and S Vietnam (S to S Annam).
- D. r. lefoli (Delacour & Jabouille, 1928) – mountains of S Cambodia (Cardamom and Elephant Ranges).
- D. r. remifer (Temminck, 1823) – Sumatra (Barisan Range and Batak Highlands) and W Java.
