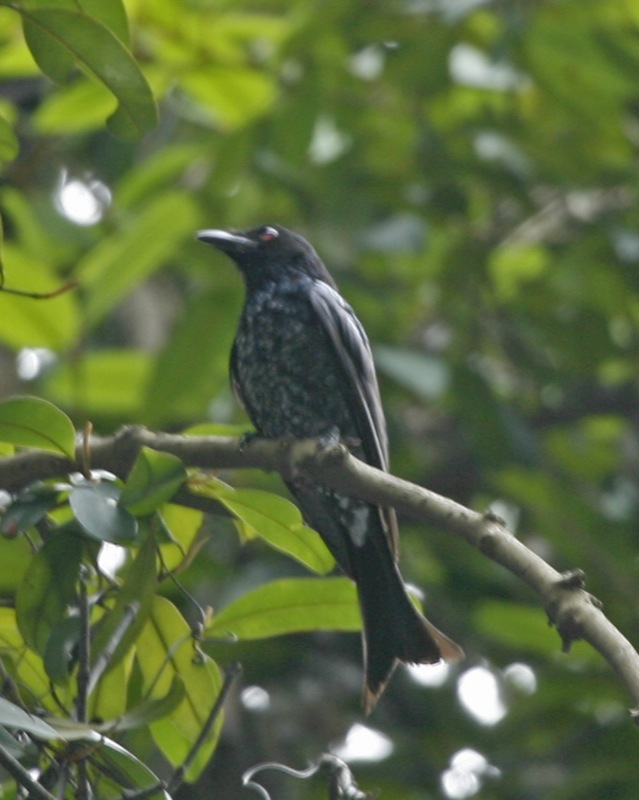

Conservation status
- Least Concern (IUCN 3.1)

Scientific classification
- Kingdom: Animalia
- Phylum: Chordata
- Class: Aves
- Order: Passeriformes
- Family: Dicruridae
- Genus: Dicrurus
- Species: D. annectens

Binomial name
- Dicrurus annectens (Hodgson, 1836)

= Crow-billed drongo =

Species of bird

The crow-billed drongo (Dicrurus annectens) is a species of bird in the family Dicruridae. It is native to moist tropical forests of southeastern Asia where its range extends from India to the Philippines and Indonesia. It is a completely black bird with a shallowly forked tail and is similar in appearance to the black drongo. It breeds between April and June, the cup-shaped nest being built in the fork of a branch by both birds, the female afterwards incubating the eggs. It is a common bird and the IUCN has listed it as "least concern".

== Taxonomy ==
The crow-billed drongo was originally described by the English naturalist Brian Houghton Hodgson in 1836 and given the binomial name Bhuchanga annectans. The specific epithet is a misspelling of the Latin word annectens meaning "connecting". This error has been corrected following the rules of the International Commission on Zoological Nomenclature to give the current scientific name Dicrurus annectens. The present genus Dicrurus had been introduced by the French ornithologist Louis Pierre Vieillot in 1816.

== Description ==
This bird, which is similar to the black drongo, is jet-black in color and has a stout bill. It has a forked tail.

== Distribution and habitat ==
It is found in: Bangladesh, Bhutan, Brunei, Cambodia, China, India, Indonesia, Laos, Malaysia, Myanmar, Nepal, Philippines, Singapore, Thailand, and Vietnam. Its natural habitats are subtropical or tropical moist lowland forests and subtropical or tropical mangrove forests.

== Behavior ==
This species inhabits dense evergreen forests and moist-deciduous forests. The nesting season is from April to June. The nest is usually a small cup made of grass that is held together by cobwebs. The nests can be found in the fork of a slender branch. The female incubates the eggs. However, both the male and female birds build the nest.

== Diet and Feeding ==
This species eats insects and other small animals.
