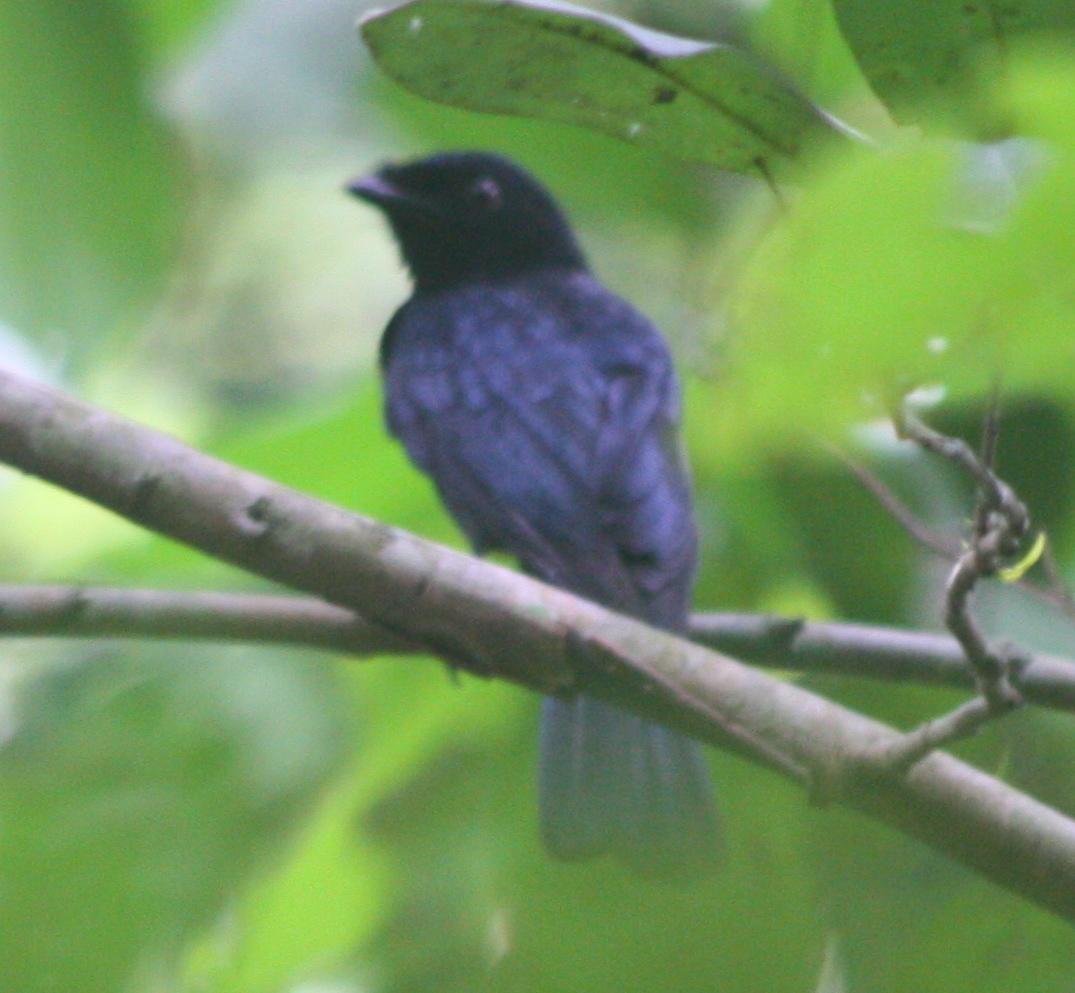

Conservation status
- Least Concern (IUCN 3.1)

Scientific classification
- Kingdom: Animalia
- Phylum: Chordata
- Class: Aves
- Order: Passeriformes
- Family: Dicruridae
- Genus: Dicrurus
- Species: D. atripennis

Binomial name
- Dicrurus atripennis Swainson, 1837

= Shining drongo =

Species of bird

The shining drongo (Dicrurus atripennis) is a species of bird in the family Dicruridae. It is native to the African tropical rainforest.
