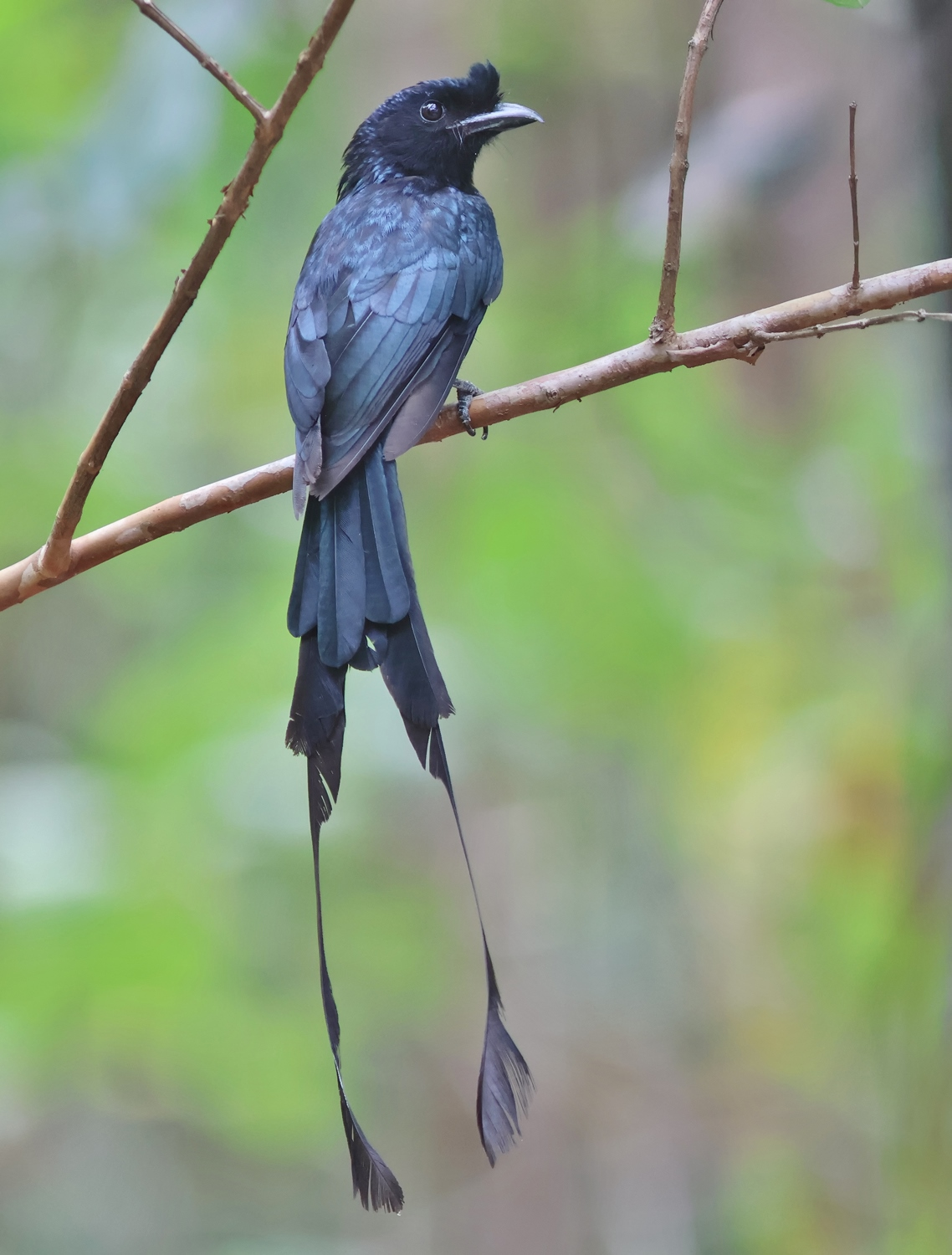

Conservation status
- Least Concern (IUCN 3.1)

Scientific classification
- Kingdom: Animalia
- Phylum: Chordata
- Class: Aves
- Order: Passeriformes
- Family: Dicruridae
- Genus: Dicrurus
- Species: D. paradiseus

Binomial name
- Dicrurus paradiseus (Linnaeus, 1766)

Synonyms
- Cuculus pardiseus Linnaeus, 1766; Dissemurus paradiseus (Linnaeus, 1766); Dissemuroides paradiseus (Linnaeus, 1766); Edolius grandis Gould, 1836

= Greater racket-tailed drongo =

Medium sized Asian bird with elongated tail feathers

The greater racket-tailed drongo (Dicrurus paradiseus) is a medium-sized Asian bird which is distinctive in having elongated outer tail feathers with webbing restricted to the tips. They are placed along with other drongos in the family Dicruridae. They are conspicuous in the forest habitats often perching in the open and by attracting attention with a wide range of loud calls that include perfect imitations of many other birds. One hypothesis suggested is that these vocal imitations may help in the formation of mixed-species foraging flocks, a feature seen in forest bird communities where many insect feeders forage together. These drongos will sometimes steal insect prey caught or disturbed by other foragers in the flock and another idea is that vocal mimicry helps them in diverting the attention of smaller birds to aid their piracy. They are diurnal but are active well before dawn and late at dusk. Owing to their widespread distribution and distinctive regional variation, they have become iconic examples of speciation by isolation and genetic drift.

== Taxonomy ==
In 1760 the French zoologist Mathurin Jacques Brisson included a description of the greater racket-tailed drongo in his Ornithologie based on a specimen that had been collected in Thailand (Siam). He used the French name Le Coucou Verd Hupé de Siam and the Latin Cuculus Siamensis Cristatus Viridis. Although Brisson coined Latin names, these do not conform to the binomial system and are not recognised by the International Commission on Zoological Nomenclature. When in 1766 the Swedish naturalist Carl Linnaeus updated his Systema Naturae for the twelfth edition, he added 240 species that had been previously described by Brisson. One of these was the greater racket-tailed drongo. Linnaeus included a brief description, coined the binomial name Cuculus paradiseus and cited Brisson's work. The current genus Dicrurus was introduced by the French ornithologist Louis Pierre Vieillot in 1816.

There are 13 recognised subspecies:

- D. p. grandis (Gould, 1836) – north India through west and north Myanmar and south China to north Indochina
- D. p. rangoonensis (Gould, 1836) – central India through Bangladesh, central Myanmar and north Thailand to central Indochina
- D. p. paradiseus (Linnaeus, 1766) – south India to south Thailand, north Malay Peninsula and south Indochina
- D. p. johni (Hartert, 1902) – Hainan Island (off southeast China)
- D. p. ceylonicus Vaurie, 1949 – Sri Lanka
- D. p. otiosus (Richmond, 1902) – Andaman Islands
- D. p. nicobariensis (Baker, ECS, 1918) – Nicobar Islands
- D. p. hypoballus (Oberholser, 1926) – central Malay Peninsula
- D. p. platurus Vieillot, 1817 – south Malay Peninsula, Sumatra and nearby islands
- D. p. microlophus (Oberholser, 1917 – islands in the South China Sea (Tioman Island, Anambas Islands and the North Natuna Islands)
- D. p. brachyphorus (Bonaparte, 1850) – Borneo
- D. p. banguey (Chasen & Kloss, 1929) – islands off north Borneo
- D. p. formosus (Cabanis, 1851) – Java

== Description ==
In most of its range in Asia, this is the largest of the drongo species and is readily identifiable by the distinctive tail rackets and the crest of curled feathers that begin in front of the face above the beak and along the crown to varying extents according to the subspecies. The tail with twirled rackets is distinctive and in flight it can appear as if two large bees were chasing a black bird. In the eastern Himalayas the species can be confused with the lesser racket-tailed drongo, however the latter has flat rackets with the crest nearly absent.

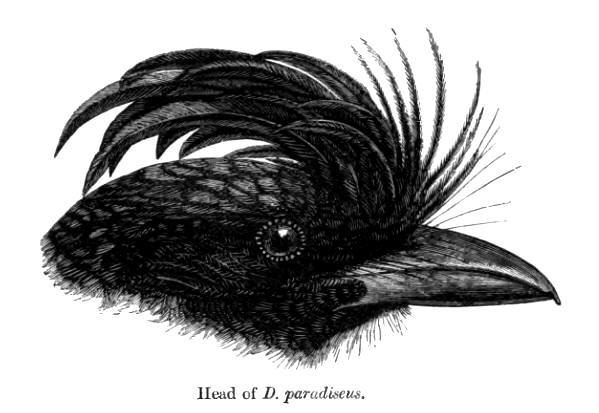
The crest size and shape varies across its range

This widespread species includes populations that have distinct variations and several subspecies have been named. The nominate form is found in southern India, mainly in forested areas of the Western Ghats and the adjoining hill forests of peninsular India. The subspecies in Sri Lanka is ceylonicus and is similar to the nominate form but slightly smaller. The subspecies found along the Himalayas is grandis and is the largest and has long glossy neck hackles. The Andaman Islands form otiosus has shorter neck hackles and the crest is highly reduced while the Nicobars Island form nicobariensis has a longer frontal crest and with smaller neck hackles than otiosus. The Sri Lanka drongo (D. lophorinus) used to be treated as a subspecies as it was believed to form hybrids with ceylonicus but is now considered a separate species on the basis of their overlapping ranges. Specimens of the nominate form have sometimes been confused with the Sri Lanka drongo. Considerable variation in shape of the bill, extent of the crest, hackles and tail rackets exists in the island populations of Southeast Asia. The Bornean brachyphorus (=insularis), banguey of Banggai lack crests (banguey has frontal feathers that arch forwards) while very reduced crests are found in microlophus (=endomychus; Natunas, Anambas and Tiomans) and platurus (Sumatra). A number of forms are known along the Southeast Asian islands and mainland including formosus (Java), hypoballus (Thailand), rangoonensis (northern Burma, central Indian populations were earlier included in this) and johni (Hainan).

Young birds are duller, and can lack a crest while moulting birds can lack the elongate tail streamers. The racket is formed by the inner web of the vane but appears to be on the outer web since the rachis has a twist just above the spatula.

== Distribution and habitat ==
The distribution range of this species extends from the western Himalayas to the eastern Himalayas and Mishmi Hills in the foothills below 1,200 m (3,900 ft). They are found in the hills of peninsular India and the Western Ghats. Continuing into the west to the islands of Borneo and Java in the east through the mainland and islands.

== Behaviour and ecology ==
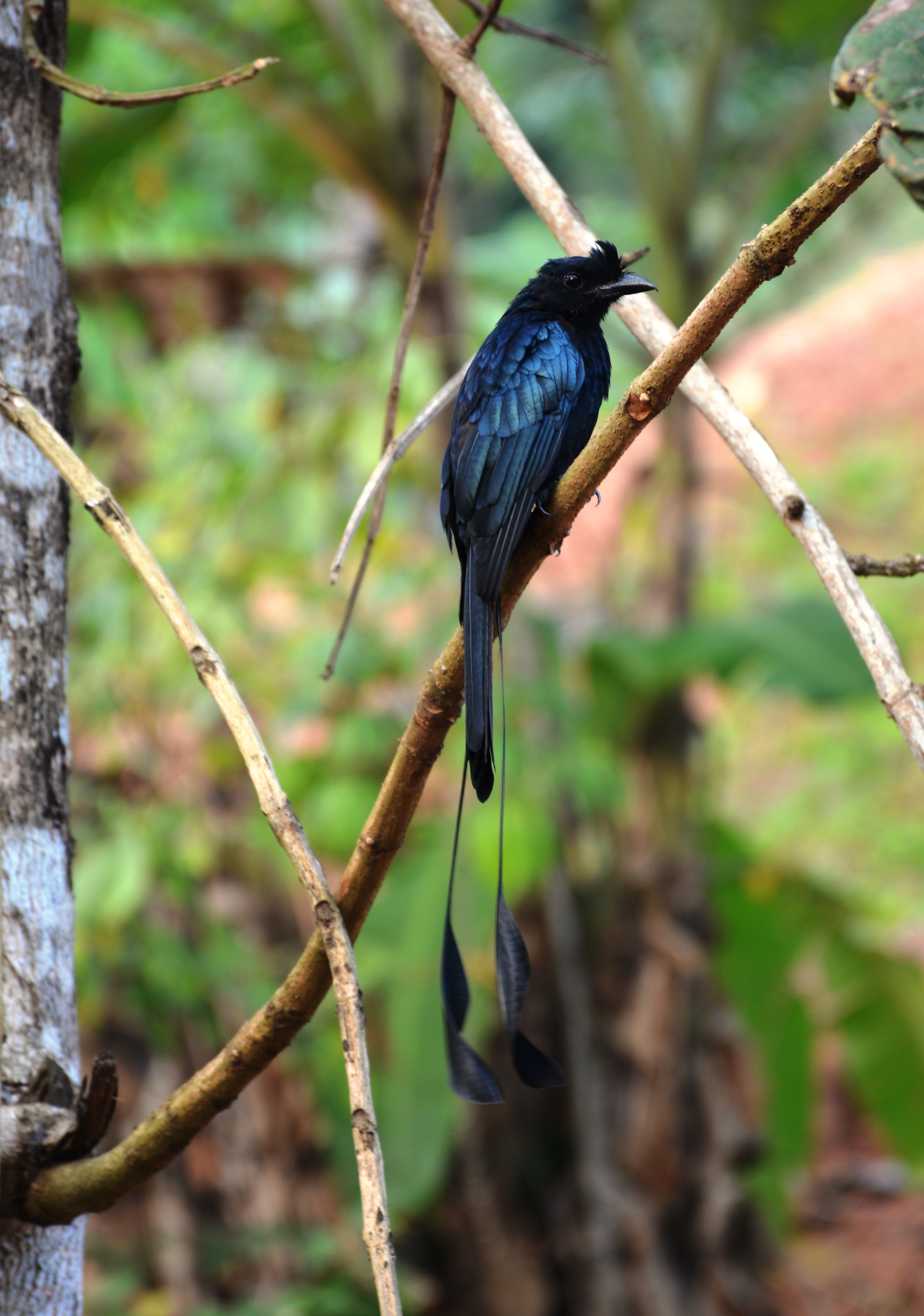
Greater racket-tailed drongo showing the twisted rachis and racquets

Like other drongos, these feed mainly on insects but also eat fruit and visit flowering trees for nectar. Having short legs, they sit upright and are often perched on high and exposed branches. They are aggressive and will sometimes mob larger birds especially when nesting. They are often active at dusk.

Song

Their calls are extremely varied and include monotonously repeated whistles, metallic and nasal sounds as well as more complex notes and imitations of other birds. They begin calling from as early as 4 am in moonlight often with a metallic tunk-tunk-tunk series. They have an ability to accurately mimic alarm calls of other birds that are learnt through interactions in mixed-species flocks. This is quite unusual, as avian vocal mimicry has hitherto been believed to be ignorant of the original context of the imitated vocalization. Grey parrots are known to use imitated human speech in correct context, but do not show this behavior in nature. This drongo's context-sensitive use of other species' alarm calls is thus analogous to a human learning useful short phrases and exclamations in a number of foreign languages. A special alarm note is raised in the presence of shikras that has been transcribed as a loud kwei-kwei-kwei...shee-cuckoo-sheecuckoo-sheecuckoo-why!. They have been said to imitate raptor calls so as to alarm other birds and steal prey from them in the ensuing panic. They are also known to imitate the calls of species (and possibly even behaviour as it was once recorded to fluff up and moving head and body like a jungle babbler when imitating its calls) that typically are members of mixed-species flocks such as babblers and it has been suggested that this has a role in the formation of mixed-species flocks. In some places they have been found to be kleptoparasitic on others in mixed-species flock, particularly laughingthrushes but they are most often involved in mutualistic and commensal relations. Several observers have found this drongo associating with foraging woodpeckers and there is a report of one following a troop of macaques.

The greater racket-tailed drongo is a resident breeder throughout its range. The breeding season in India is April to August. Their courtship display may involve hops and turns on branches with play behaviour involving dropping an object and picking it in mid air. Their cup nest is built in the fork of a tree, often a smooth-boled tree with an isolated canopy, The nesting pair may even remove bits of bark on the trunk to make it smooth. The usual clutch is three to four eggs. The eggs are creamy white with blotches of reddish brown which are more dense at the broad end.

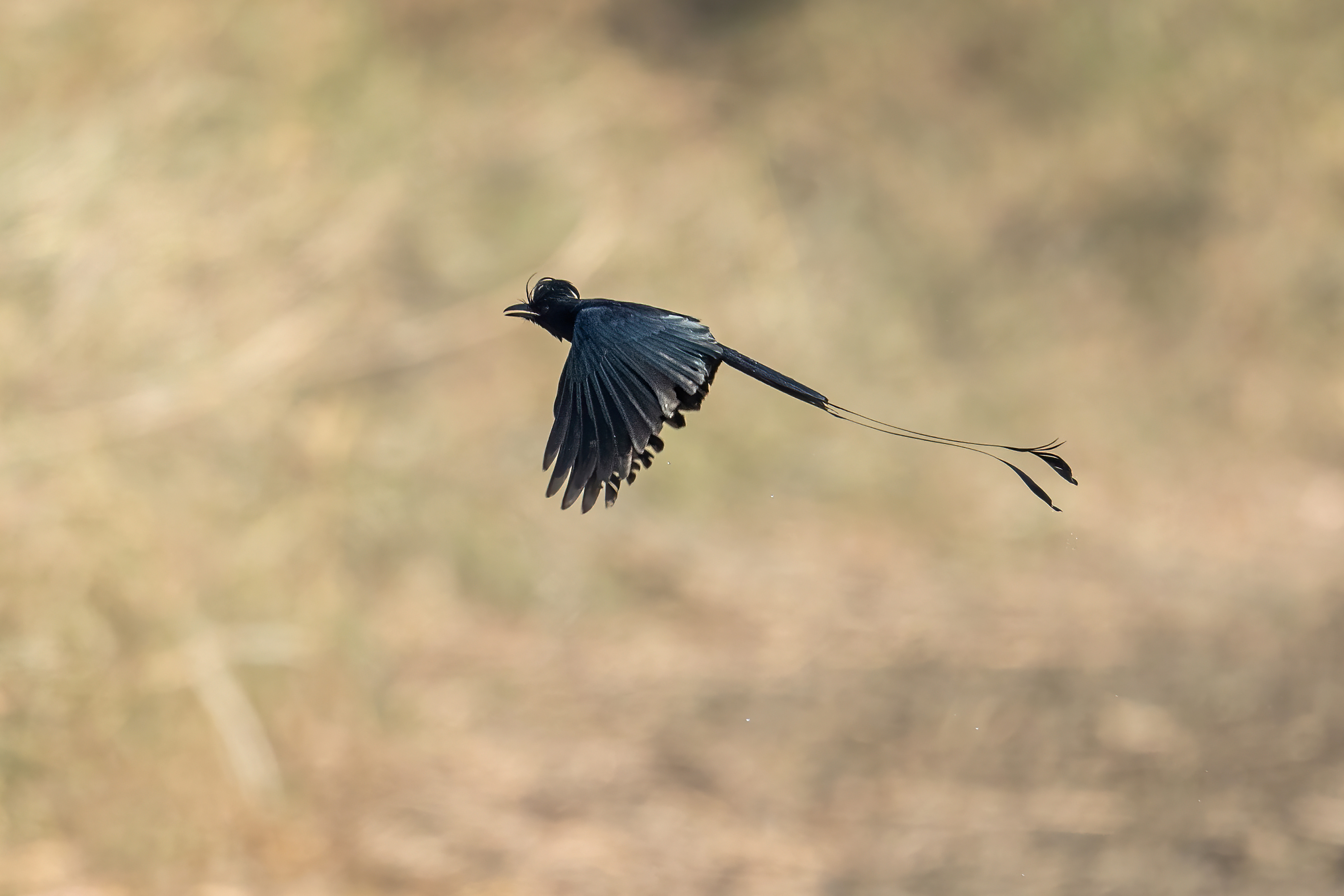
In flight, at Nijgadh, Nepal

== In culture ==
The common whistle note that is made leads to its local name in many parts of India of kothwal (which means a "policeman" or "guard", who used a whistle that produced a similar note), a name also applied to the black drongo and in other places as the Bhimraj or Bhringaraj. In Mizo language of northeast India, it is called Vakul and the Mizo people use the tail feathers in ceremonies. Prior to the 1950s it was often kept in captivity by people in parts of India. It was said to be very hardy and like a crow, accommodating a varied diet. Edward H. Schafer considered the greater racket-tailed drongo as the basis for the divine kalaviṅka birds mentioned in Chinese and Japanese Buddhist texts.
