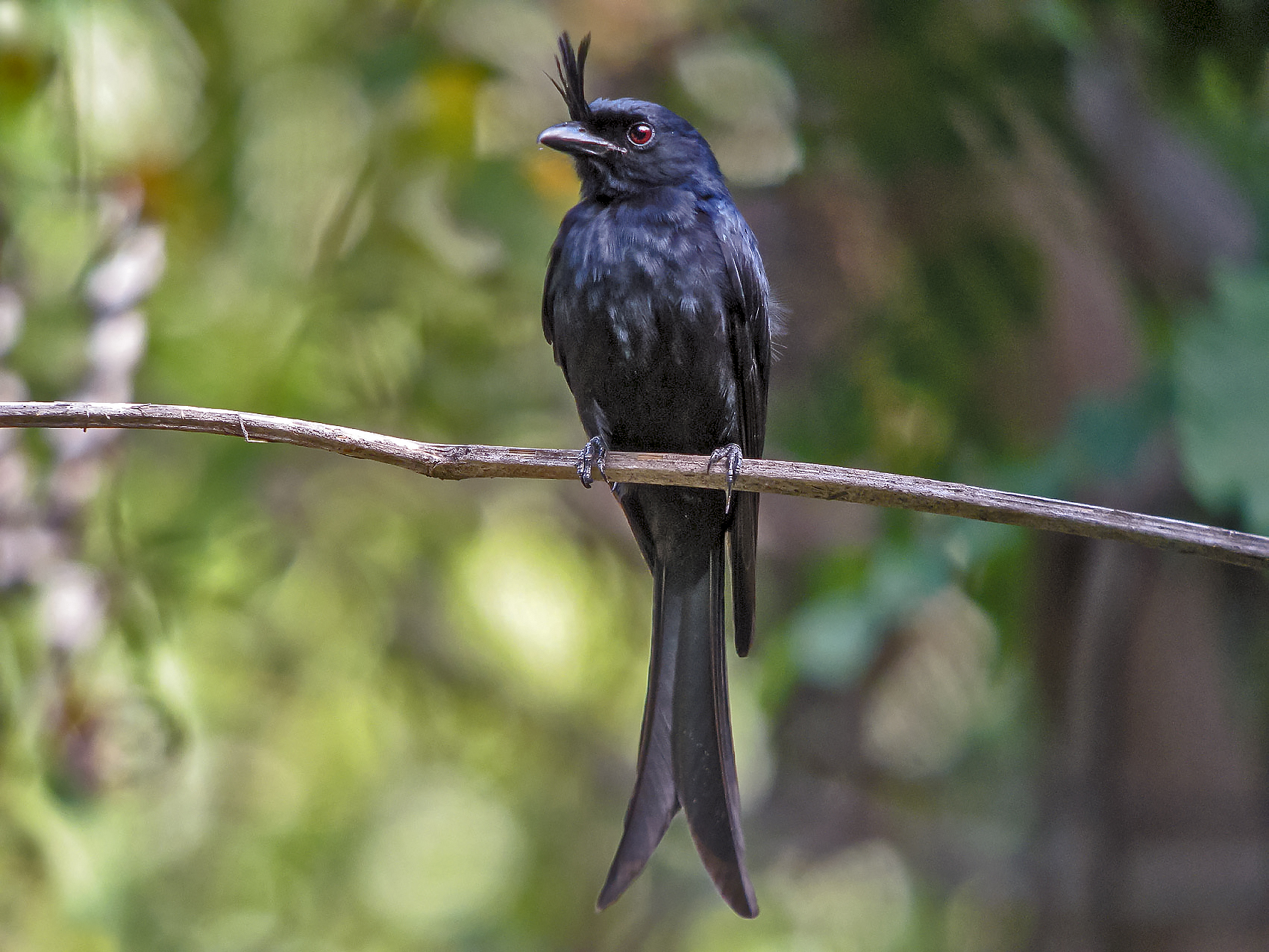

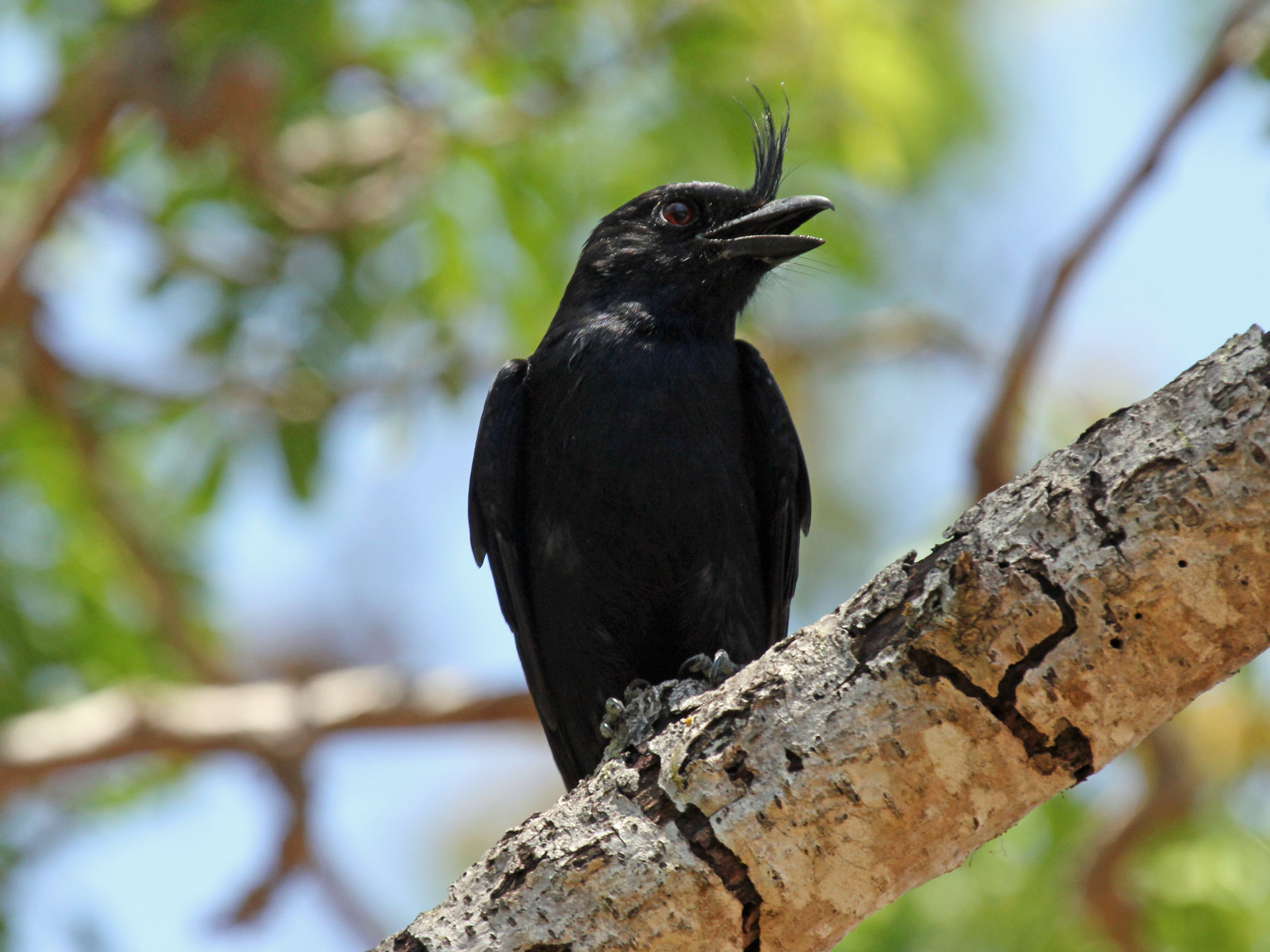

Conservation status
- Least Concern (IUCN 3.1)

Scientific classification
- Kingdom: Animalia
- Phylum: Chordata
- Class: Aves
- Order: Passeriformes
- Family: Dicruridae
- Genus: Dicrurus
- Species: D. forficatus

Binomial name
- Dicrurus forficatus (Linnaeus, 1766)

Subspecies
- D. f. forficatus; D. f. potior

Synonyms
- Lanius forficatus Linnaeus, 1766

= Crested drongo =

Species of bird

The crested drongo (Dicrurus forficatus) is a passerine bird in the family Dicruridae. It is black with a bluish-green sheen, a distinctive crest on the forehead and a forked tail. There are two subspecies; D. f. forficatus is endemic to Madagascar and D. f. potior, which is larger, is found on the Comoro Islands. Its habitat is lowland forests, both dry and humid, and open savannah country. It is a common bird and the IUCN has listed it as "least concern".

== Taxonomy ==
In 1760 the French zoologist Mathurin Jacques Brisson included a description of the crested drongo in his Ornithologie based on a specimen collected in Madagascar. He used the French name Le grand gobe-mouche noir hupé de Madagascar and the Latin Muscicapa Madagascariensis nigra major cristata. Although Brisson coined Latin names, these do not conform to the binomial system and are not recognised by the International Commission on Zoological Nomenclature. When in 1766 the Swedish naturalist Carl Linnaeus updated his Systema Naturae for the twelfth edition, he added 240 species that had been previously described by Brisson. One of these was the crested drongo. Linnaeus included a brief description, coined the binomial name Lanius forficatus and cited Brisson's work. The specific name forficatus is Neo-Latin for "scissor-shaped". This species is now placed in the genus Dicrurus that was introduced by French ornithologist Louis Pierre Vieillot in 1816.

Two subspecies are recognised:

- D. f. forficatus (Linnaeus, 1766) – Madagascar and nearby islands
- D. f. potior (Bangs & T E Penard, 1922) – island of Anjouan, Comoros

The common name of drongo, now applied to all members of the family Dicruridae, was originally a Malagasy word from the Betsimisaraka dialect; more commonly it is called railovy in Malagasy.

== Description ==
The adult male and female are almost entirely black, with a blue-green sheen. The distinctive crest consists of elongated feathers on the forehead. The forked tail is also distinctive of the adult birds. D. f. potior is larger and has broader tail feathers.

== Distribution and habitat ==
The nominated race is endemic to Madagascar, and found throughout the island, and some of the larger inshore islands including Nosy-Bé. The Dicrurus forficatus potior subspecies on only found on the Comoro Islands.

Its natural habitats are subtropical or tropical dry forest, subtropical or tropical moist lowland forest, and dry savanna, typically below 1,000 meters.

== Gallery ==
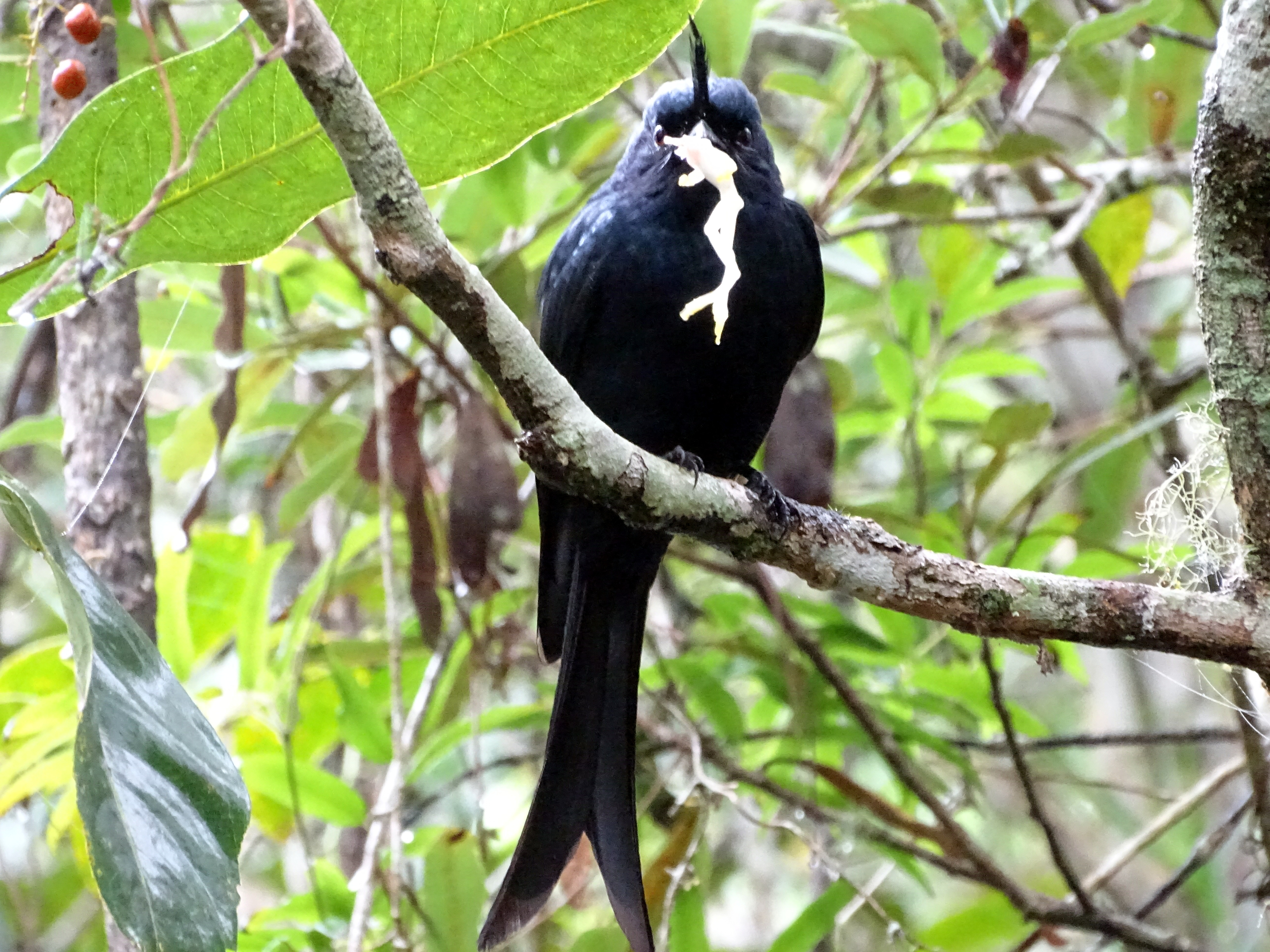
With a frog, Mantadia National Park, Madagascar

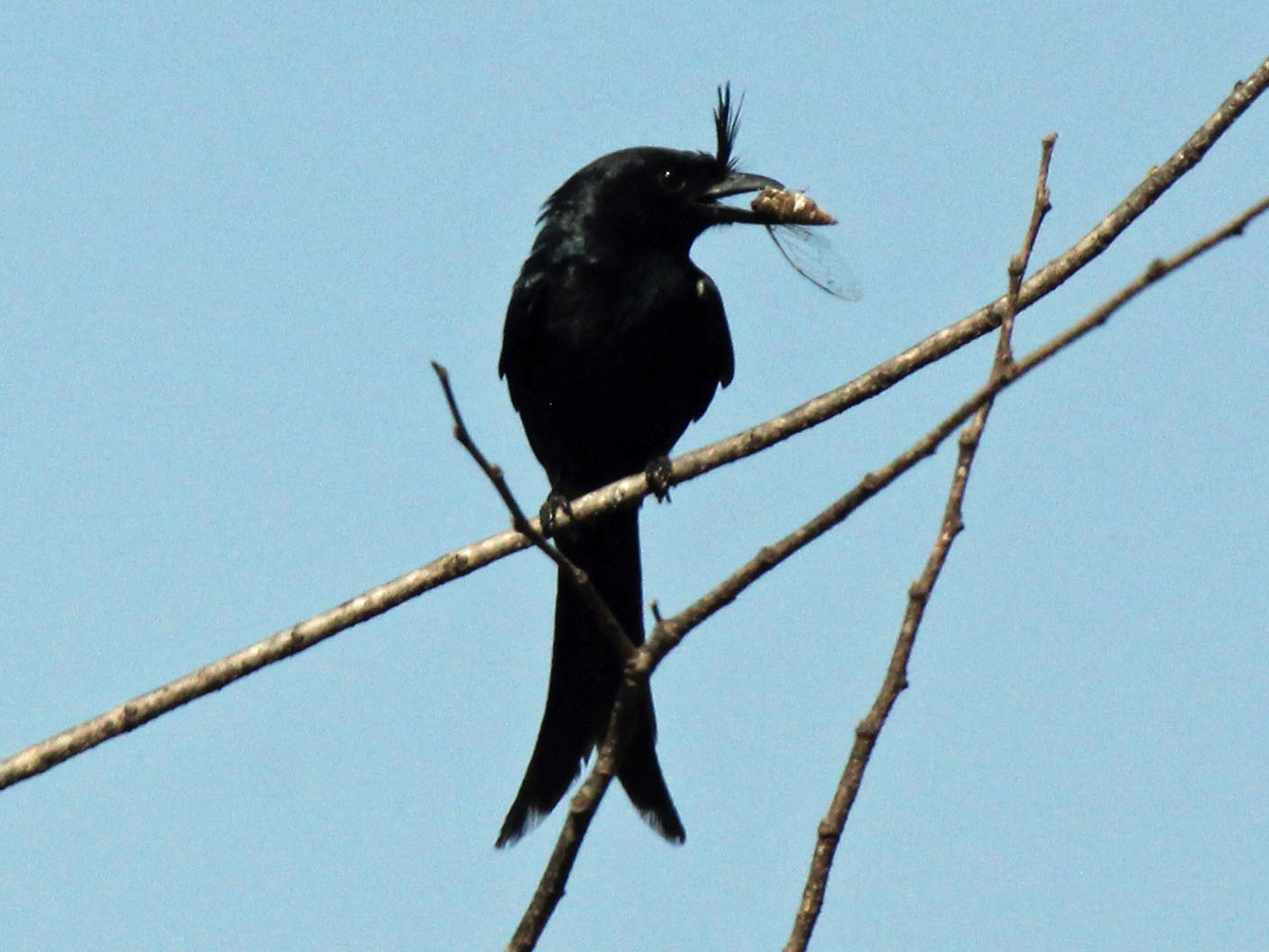
With an insect

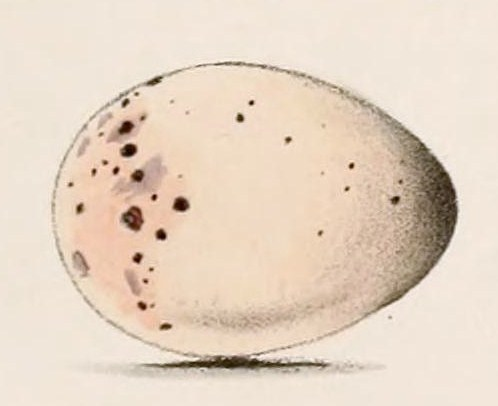
Egg

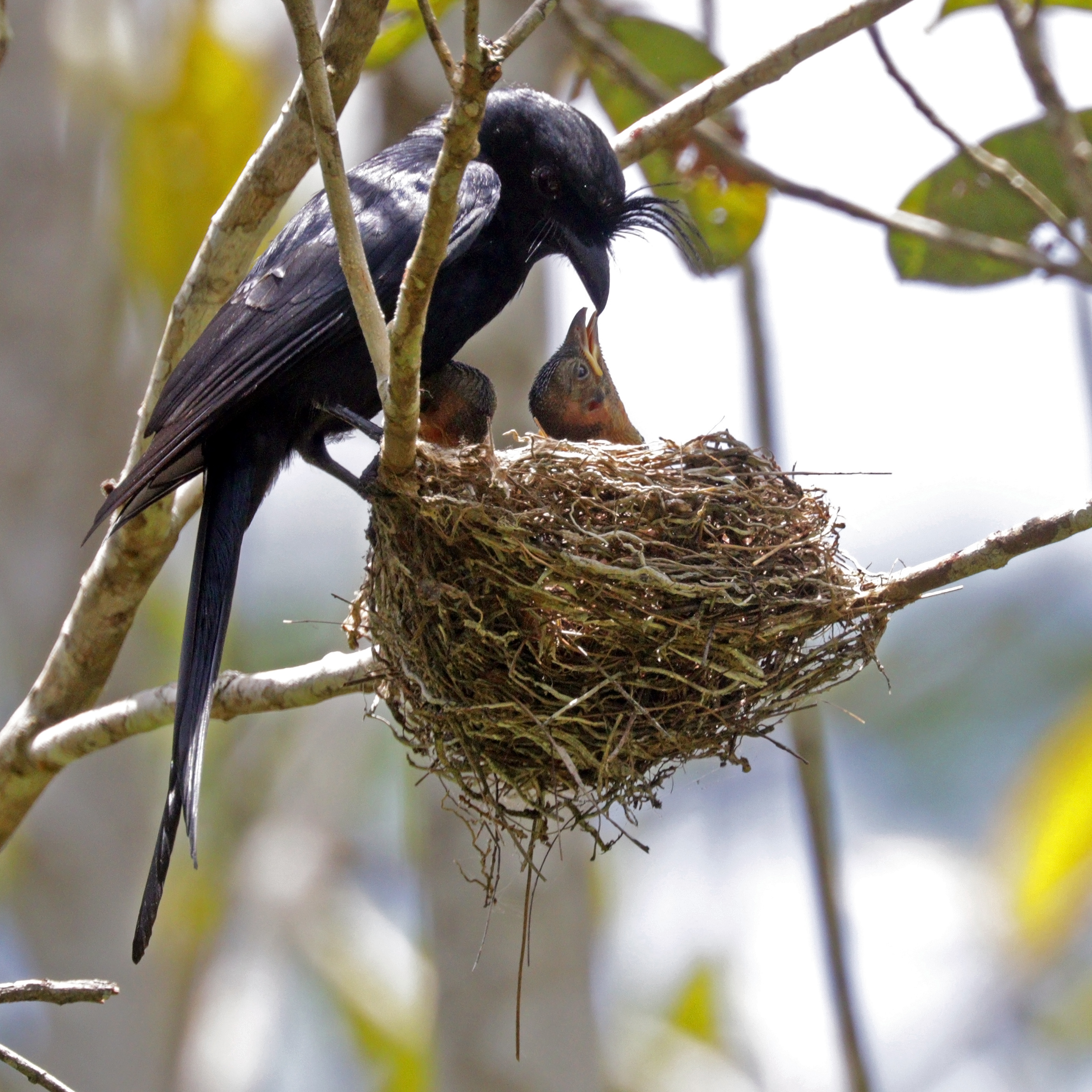
feeding chicks, Analamazaotra Special Reserve
