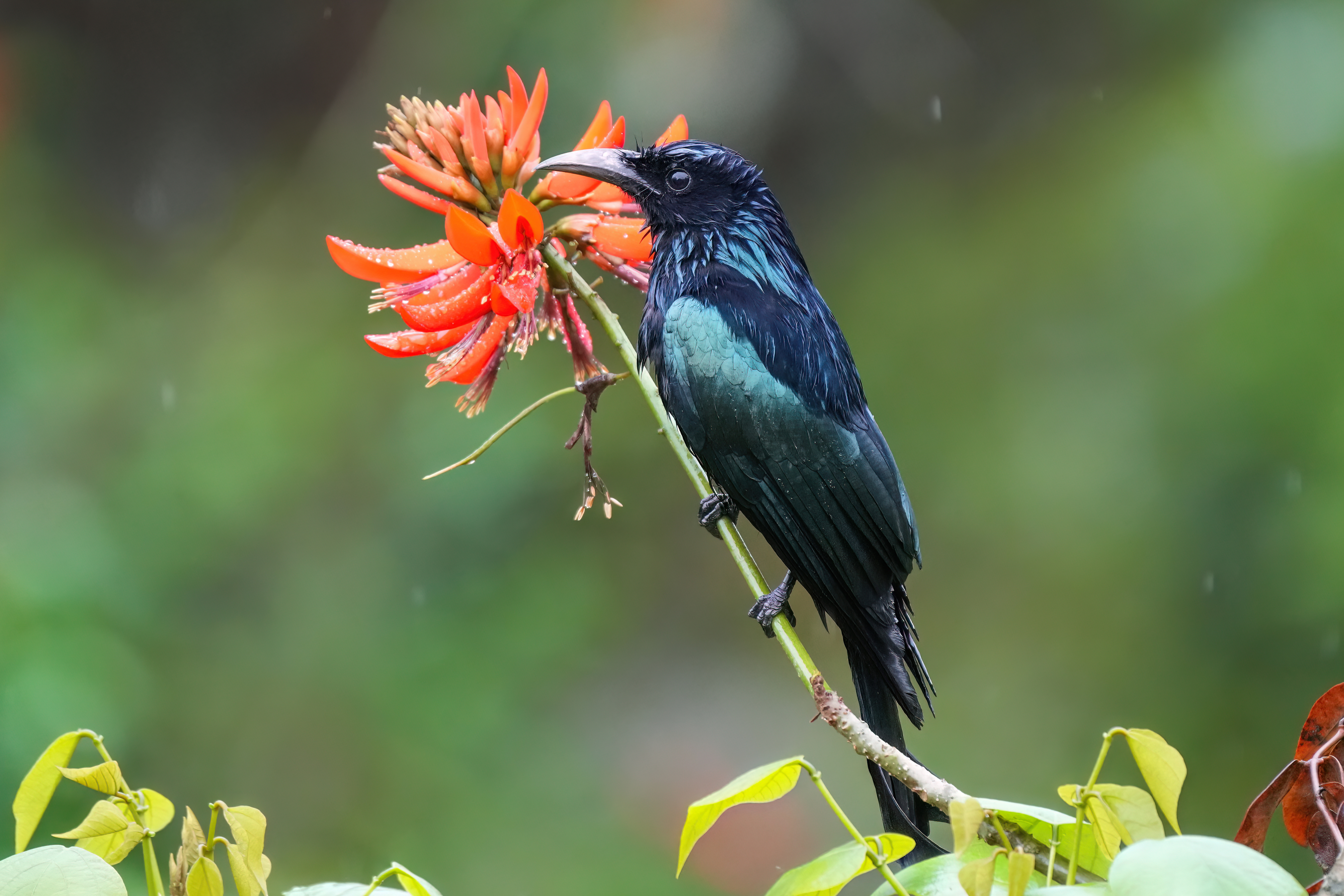
- Adult in Jim Corbett National Park, India

Conservation status
- Least Concern (IUCN 3.1)

Scientific classification
- Kingdom: Animalia
- Phylum: Chordata
- Class: Aves
- Order: Passeriformes
- Family: Dicruridae
- Genus: Dicrurus
- Species: D. hottentottus

Binomial name
- Dicrurus hottentottus (Linnaeus, 1766)

Synonyms
- Corvus hottentottus Linnaeus, 1766

= Hair-crested drongo =

Species of bird

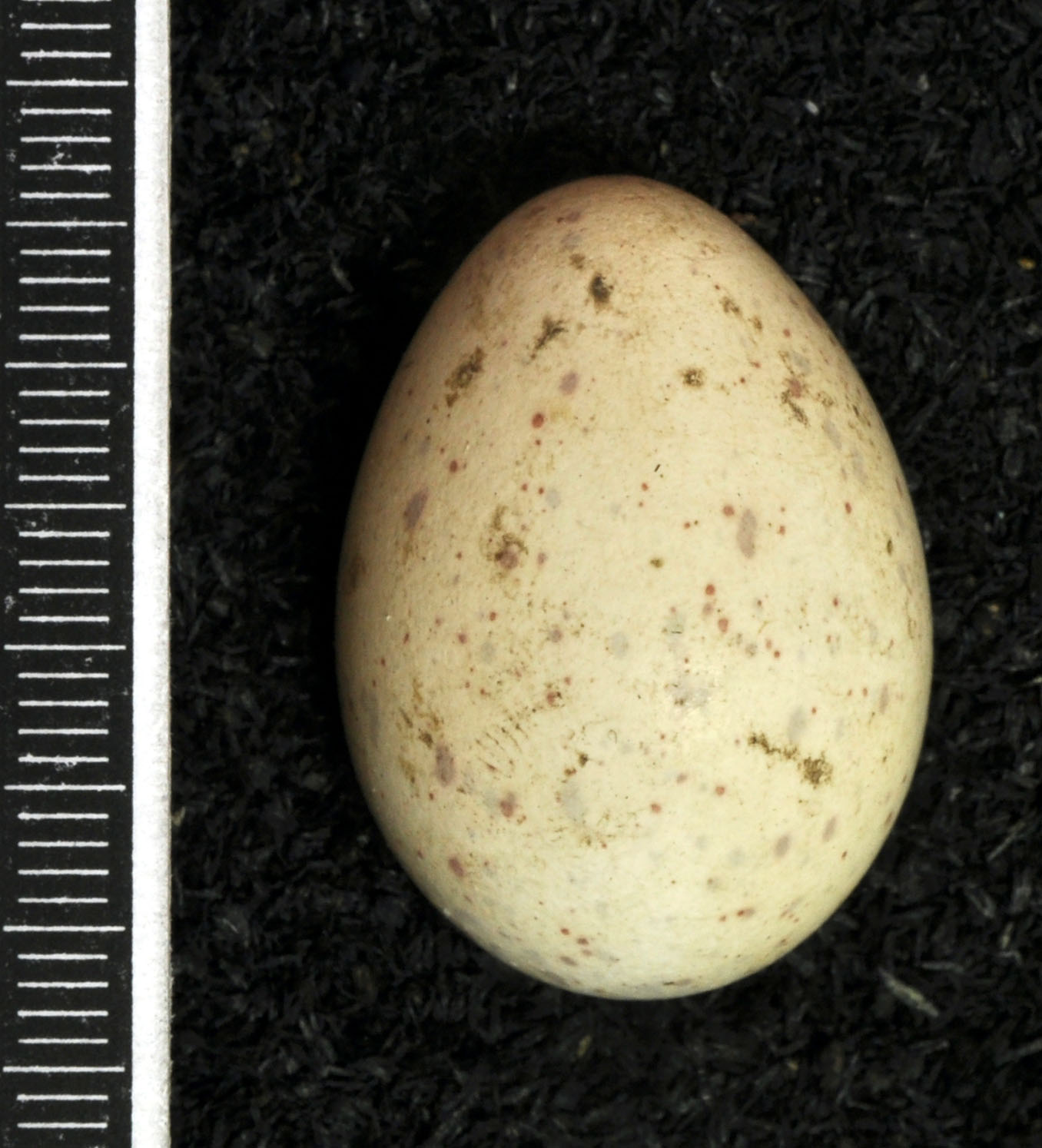
Egg, Collection Museum Wiesbaden

The hair-crested drongo (Dicrurus hottentottus) is an Asian bird of the family Dicruridae. This species was formerly considered conspecific with Dicrurus bracteatus, for which the name "spangled drongo" – formerly used for both – is now usually reserved. Some authorities include the Sumatran drongo (D. sumatranus) in D. hottentottus as subspecies.

It is native from Pakistan, Bangladesh, India, and Bhutan through Indochina to China, Indonesia, and Brunei. Hair-crested drongos move in small flocks and are very noisy. The "spangled drongo", Dicrurus bracteatus, is native on the east coast of Australia and its name is a pejorative slang for a silly person. This may be due to its strange chattering and cackling.

== Taxonomy ==
In 1760, French zoologist Mathurin Jacques Brisson included a description of the hair-crested drongo in his Ornithologie based on a specimen that he mistakenly believed had been collected from the Cape of Good Hope in South Africa. He used the French name Le choucas du Cap de Bonne Espérance and the Latin Monedula Capitis Bonae Spei. Although Brisson coined Latin names, these do not conform to the binomial system and are not recognised by the International Commission on Zoological Nomenclature. When in 1766, Swedish naturalist Carl Linnaeus updated his Systema Naturae for the 12th edition, he added 240 species that had been previously described by Brisson. One of these was the hair-crested drongo. Linnaeus included a brief description, coined the binomial name Corvus hottentottus and cited Brisson's work. The type locality was subsequently corrected to Chandannagar in West Bengal. The specific name hottentottus is from "Hottentot", a term formerly used for the Khoikhoi, a nomadic pastoral people of southwest Africa. This species is now placed in the genus Dicrurus that was introduced for the drongos by French ornithologist Louis Pierre Vieillot in 1816.

Twelve subspecies are currently recognised, although some have been proposed as separate species:

- D. h. hottentottus (Linnaeus, 1766) – India, central Myanmar and southern Indochina
- D. h. brevirostris (Cabanis, 1851) – central and southern [China, northern Myanmar, and northern Indochina
- D. h. borneensis (Sharpe, 1879) (Bornean spangled drongo) – Borneo and Maratua Island (Note: Proposed as separate species)
- D. h. guillemardi (Salvadori, 1890) (Obi spangled drongo) – Obi Islands, North Maluku
- D. h. pectoralis Wallace, 1863 (Sula spangled drongo) – Sula Island, Philippines
- D. h. suluensis Hartert, 1902 (Sulu spangled drongo) – Sulu Archipelago, southwest Philippines
- D. h. viridinitens (Salvadori, 1894) (Mentawai Spangled Drongo) – Mentawai Islands, western Sumatra;
- D. h. banggaiensis Vaurie, 1952 – Banggai Islands, eastern Sulawesi; (Note: It has been proposed to recognise leucops and banggaiensis as a separate species, the white-eyed spangled drongo)
- D. h. leucops Wallace, 1865 – Sulawesi and nearby islands;
- D. h. faberi Hoogerwerf, 1962 – Panaitan Island in western Java (Note: It has been proposed to recognise faberi, jentincki and termeuleni as a separate species, the Javan spangled drongo.)
- D. h. jentincki (Vorderman, 1893) – Bali, eastern Java and some islands in the Java Sea
- D. h. termeuleni (Finsch, 1907) – Seribu Islands and islands in Jakarta Bay, northern Java

Notes:

Several other former subspecies are now recognised as separate species or subspecies of other species in the species complex, the Tablas drongo (Dicrurus menagei) and the Palawan drongo (Dicrurus palawanensis, including subspecies cuyensis).
