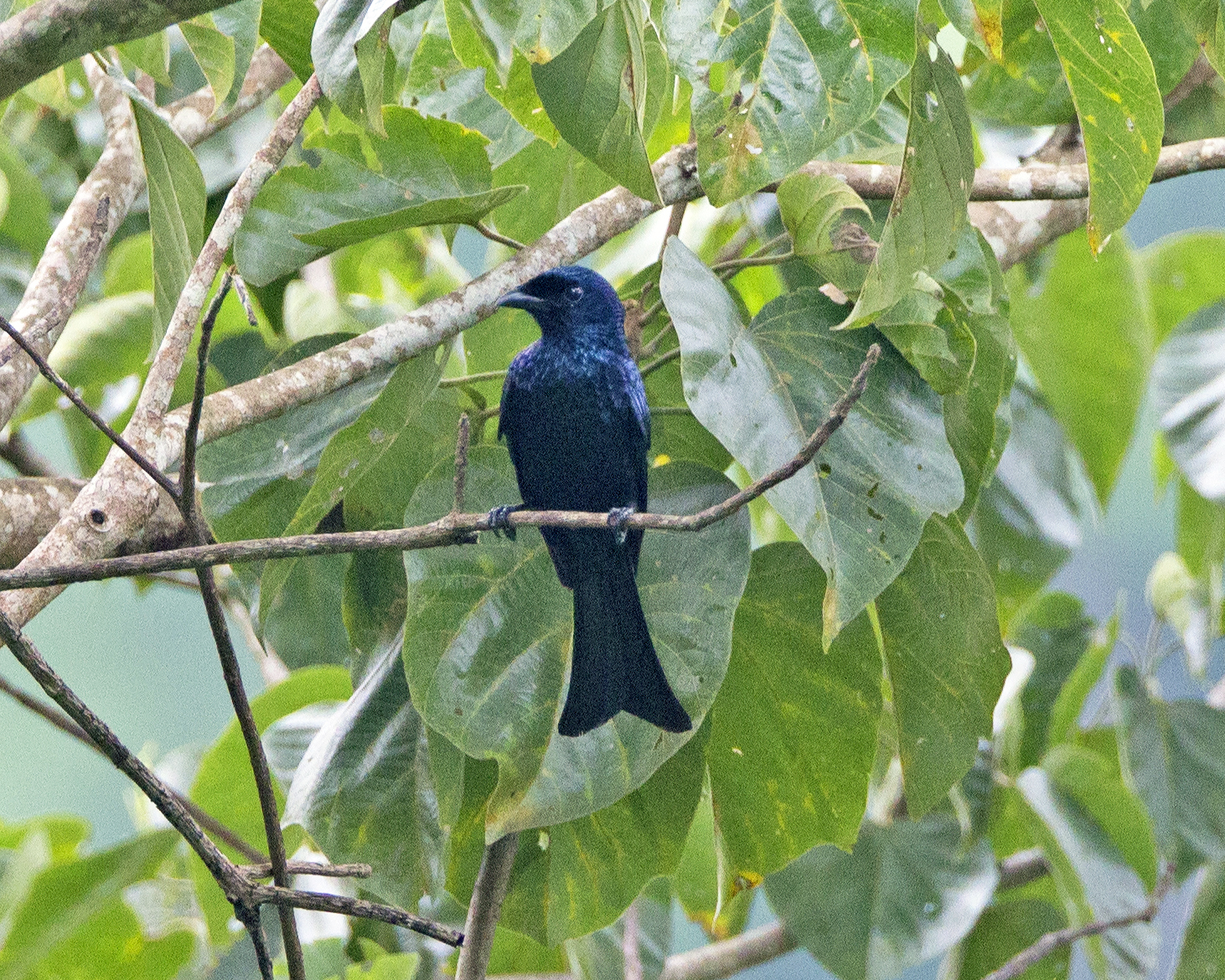

Conservation status
- Least Concern (IUCN 3.1)

Scientific classification
- Kingdom: Animalia
- Phylum: Chordata
- Class: Aves
- Order: Passeriformes
- Family: Dicruridae
- Genus: Dicrurus
- Species: D. balicassius

Binomial name
- Dicrurus balicassius (Linnaeus, 1766)

Synonyms
- Corvus balicassius Linnaeus, 1766

= Balicassiao =

Species of bird

The balicassiao (Dicrurus balicassius) is a species of passerine bird in the family Dicruridae. It is endemic to the Philippines. Its natural habitat is tropical moist lowland forests.

== Description and taxonomy ==
In 1760 the French zoologist Mathurin Jacques Brisson included a description of the balicassiao in his Ornithologie based on a specimen collected in the Philippines. He used the French name Le choucas des Philippines and the Latin Monedula Philippensis. Although Brisson coined Latin names, these do not conform to the binomial system and are not recognised by the International Commission on Zoological Nomenclature. When in 1766 the Swedish naturalist Carl Linnaeus updated his Systema Naturae for the twelfth edition, he added 240 species that had been previously described by Brisson. One of these was the balicassiao. Linnaeus included a brief description, coined the binomial name Corvus balicassius and cited Brisson's work. The specific name balicassius is from Balicasiao, the Cebuano word for this bird. This species is now placed in the genus Dicrurus that was introduced by French ornithologist Louis Pierre Vieillot in 1816.

=== Subspecies ===
Three subspecies are recognized:

- D. b.balicassius — Found on Central and South Luzon, Polillo, Lubang, Verde, Mindoro, Marinduque and Catanduanes
- D. b. abraensis — Found on North Luzon
- D. b. mirabilis — Found on Ticao, Masbate, Panay, Guimaras, Negros, Bantayan and Cebu; has a distinct white belly and may be a separate species

== Behaviour and ecology ==
Typically seen perching on a single conspicuous branch, where it flies off to catch insects and returns to the same perch. Also, forages by turning and searching leaves and flowers for insects. Forages alone or in small groups.

Not much is known about its breeding habits. Birds collected in breeding condition with enlarged gonds in October to July. It is generally believed that this species breeds all year-round. Nest found in March was described as an open cup made of brown plant fibers and cobwebs. This nest contained 3 eggs. No other information was published.

== Habitat and conservation status ==
Its natural habitats at tropical moist lowland primary forest and secondary forest up to 1,200 meters above sea level.

The IUCN Red List has assessed this bird as least-concern species as it is still locally common and has a large range despite deforestation in the Philippines
