= Birds of South Asia: The Ripley Guide =

Two-volume ornithological handbook by Pamela Rasmussen and John Anderton

- Author: Pamela C. Rasmussen and John C. Anderton
- Illustrator: Anderton and eleven other artists
- Cover artist: Anderton
- Language: English
- Publisher: Smithsonian Institution and Lynx Edicions
- Publication date: 2005
- Publication place: United States
- Media type: Print (hardback)
- ISBN: 84-87334-67-9 (both vols.); 84-87334-65-2 (vol. 1); 84-87334-66-0 (vol. 2)
- OCLC: 433009160

Birds of South Asia: The Ripley Guide by Pamela C. Rasmussen and John C. Anderton is a two-volume ornithological handbook, covering the birds of South Asia, published in 2005 (second edition in 2012) by the Smithsonian Institution and Lynx Edicions. The geographical scope of the book covers India, Bangladesh, Pakistan, Sri Lanka, Nepal, Bhutan, Maldives, the Chagos Archipelago and Afghanistan (the latter country had been excluded from previous works covering this region). In total, 1508 species are covered (this figure includes 85 hypothetical and 67 'possible' species, which are given only shorter accounts). Two notable aspects of Birds of South Asia are its distribution evidence-base — the book's authors based their distributional information almost completely on museum specimens — and its taxonomic approach, involving a large number of species-level splits.

== The books ==
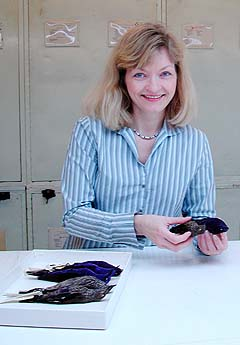
Pamela Rasmussen

Volume 1 is a field guide. A nine-page introduction is followed by 180 colour plates, each with an accompanying text page giving brief identification notes, and, for most species, range maps. In addition to the 69 plates by Anderton, eleven other artists contributed, including Ian Lewington and Bill Zetterström. Volume 2: Attributes and Status contains more detailed supporting texts for every species. Twelve other authors are listed as having contributed to this volume, including Per Alström, Nigel Collar and Craig Robson. This volume opens with an appreciation, written by Bruce Beehler, of S. Dillon Ripley, who initiated the work which led to the book, and after whom it is named. This is followed by a 24-page introduction. The bulk of the book, from pages 41 to 601, consists of individual species accounts; each of these includes sections on identification, occurrence, habits and voice (this latter section accompanied by sonograms for many species). There are ten appendices, including a hypothetical list, a list of rejected species, a summary of taxonomic changes, a glossary, a gazetteer, and a list of institutions holding major collections of South Asian bird specimens.

The book's covers are illustrated by montages of South Asian birds, painted by Anderton. Volume 1 features crimson-backed flameback, stork-billed kingfisher, Indian eagle-owl, black-and-orange flycatcher and Himalayan quail on its front cover. Volume 2 features six laughingthrush species: variegated, Bhutan, grey-sided, blue-winged, black-chinned and Assam. The back covers of both volumes feature a painting of Serendib and Nicobar scops owls.

== Taxonomic changes ==
In preparing the book, the authors undertook a major revision of the taxonomic status of bird forms found in the region; many allopatric forms previously regarded as conspecific are treated by Rasmussen and Anderton as full species. Many of these had previously been proposed elsewhere, but the book introduced a number of innovations of its own. The majority of these changes, and the overwhelming majority of the novel ones, are among the passerines. The following is a list of the groups of taxa which are considered conspecific in the sixth edition of the Clements Checklist (Clements 2007), but split into two or more species in Rasmussen and Anderton's work (volume 2 page references in brackets).

=== Non-passerines ===
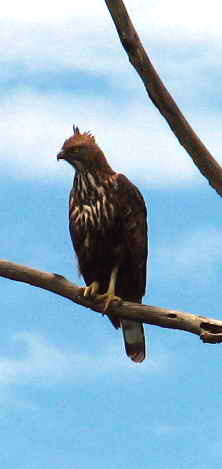
Crested hawk-eagle

- (p. 53) Oriental darter (Anhinga melanogaster) is treated as a monotypic Asian species, separate from African (A. rufa) and Australasian (A. novaehollandiae) darters.
- (p. 58) Cattle egret (Bubulcus ibis) is split into two species: western cattle egret (B. ibis sensu stricto) and eastern cattle egret (B. coromandus)
- (p. 60) Black-backed bittern (Ixobrychus dubius) is split from little bittern (I. minutus)
- (pp. 68–9) Whistling (Cygnus columbianus) and Bewick's (C. bewickii) swans are regarded as separate species
- (pp. 74–5) Spot-billed duck (Anas poecilorhyncha) is split into two species, Indian spot-billed duck (A. poecilorhyncha sensu stricto) and Chinese spot-billed duck (A. zonorhyncha)
- (pp. 101–2) Common buzzard (Buteo buteo) is split into two or three species: common buzzard (B. buteo sensu stricto), Himalayan buzzard (B. burmanicus) and Japanese buzzard (B. (buteo) japonicus)
- (pp. 108–9) Changeable (Spizaetus limnaeetus) and crested (S. cirrhatus) hawk-eagles are treated as separate species
- (pp. 141–2) Eastern water rail (Rallus indicus) is split from (European) water rail (R. aquaticus)
- (pp. 154–5) Kentish (Charadrius alexandrinus) and snowy (C. nivosus) plovers are treated as separate species
- (pp. 181–2) Indian stone-curlew (Burhinus indicus) is split from Eurasian stone-curlew (B. oedicnemus)
- (pp. 211–2) Emerald dove (Chalcophaps indica) is split into two species: emerald dove (Chalcophaps indica sensu stricto) and an Australasian species C. longirostris
- (pp. 212–4) Pompadour green pigeon (Treron pompadora) is split into four to six species: Ceylon green-pigeon T. pompadora sensu stricto, grey-fronted green pigeon T. affinis, ashy-headed green pigeon T. phayrei, Andaman green pigeon T. chloropterus from South Asia, and possible fifth and sixth species, T. (phayrei) axillaris and T. (phayrei) aromaticus from the Philippines and Buru in the Moluccas respectively.
- (p. 217) Nicobar imperial pigeon (Ducula nicobarica) is split from green imperial pigeon (D. aenea)
- (p. 233) Andaman barn-owl (Tyto deroepstorffi) is split from barn owl (T. alba)
- (p. 235) Ceylon bay owl (Phodilus assimilis) is split from Oriental bay owl (Ph. badius)
- (p. 244) Himalayan wood owl (Strix nivicola) is split from tawny owl (S. aluco)
- (p. 248) Hume's hawk-owl (Ninox obscura) is split from brown hawk-owl (N. scutulata)
- (p. 278) Crimson-fronted barbet (Megalaima rubricapillus) is split into two species, Malabar barbet (M. malabarica) and Ceylon small barbet (M. rubricapillus sensu stricto)
- (p. 290) Crimson-backed flameback (Chrysocolaptes stricklandi) is split from greater flameback (C. lucidus)

=== Passerines ===
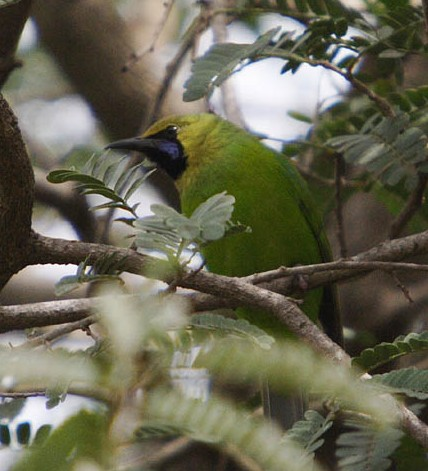
Jerdon's leafbird

- (p. 310) Grey-throated sand-martin (Riparia chinensis) is split from brown-throated sand-martin (R. paludicola)
- (p. 311) Pale crag martin (Ptyonoprogne obsoleta) is split from rock martin (P. fuligula)
- (p. 312) Hill swallow (Hirundo domicola) is split from Pacific swallow (H. tahitica)
- (p. 313) Ceylon swallow (Hirundo hyperythra) is split from red-rumped swallow (H. daurica)
- (p. 323) Andaman cuckooshrike (Coracina dobsoni) is split from bar-bellied cuckooshrike (C. striata)
- (p. 326) Jerdon's minivet Pericrocotus albifrons is split from white-bellied minivet (P. erythropygius)
- (pp. 327–8) Orange minivet (Pericrocotus flammeus) and scarlet minivet (P. speciosus) are regarded as separate species
- (p. 330) Malabar woodshrike (Tephrodornis sylvicola) is split from large woodshrike (T. gularis)
- (pp. 331–2) Ceylon woodshrike (Tephrodornis affinis) is split from common woodshrike (T. pondicerianus)
- (p. 336) Andaman bulbul (Pycnonotus fuscoflavescens) is split from black-headed bulbul (P. atriceps)
- (pp. 336–7) Black-crested bulbul (Pycnonotus melanicterus) is split into five species: black-crested bulbul sensu stricto (P. flaviventris), black-capped bulbul (P. melanicterus sensu stricto), flame-throated bulbul (P. gularis), ruby-throated bulbul (P. dispar) and Bornean bulbul (P. montis)
- (p. 344) Square-tailed black bulbul (Hypsipetes ganeesa) is split from black bulbul (H. madagascariensis)
- (p. 348) Jerdon's leafbird (Chloropsis jerdoni) is split from blue-winged leafbird (C. cochinchinensis)

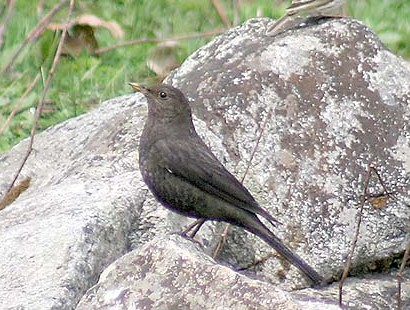
Tibetan blackbird

- (p. 349) Isabelline shrike (Lanius isabellinus) is split into two species, Daurian shrike (L. isabellinus sensu stricto) and Turkestan shrike (L. phoenicuroides)
- (pp. 358–9) White's thrush (Zoothera aurea), Nilgiri thrush (Z. neilgherriensis) and Ceylon scaly thrush (Z. imbricata) are split from scaly thrush (Z. dauma)
- (pp. 363–4) Common blackbird (Turdus merula) is split into three or four species: common blackbird (T. merula) sensu stricto, Tibetan blackbird (T. maximus), Indian blackbird (T. simillimus) and Chinese blackbird (T. (merula) mandarinus)
- (pp. 365–6) Red-throated thrush (Turdus ruficollis) and black-throated thrush (T. atrogularis) are treated as separate species
- (p. 372) Nicobar jungle-flycatcher (Rhinomyias nicobaricus) is split from brown-chested jungle-flycatcher (R. brunneatus)
- (p. 385) Large blue flycatcher (Cyornis magnirostris) is split from hill blue flycatcher (C. banyumas)

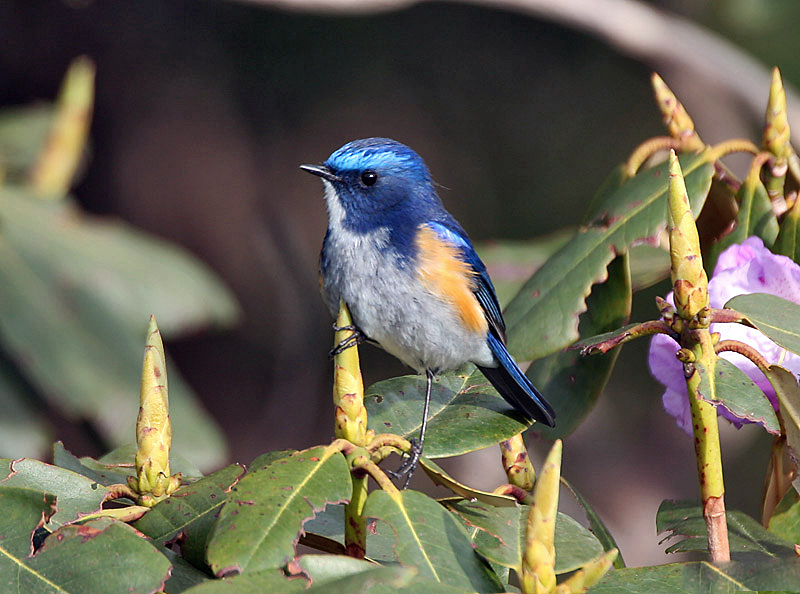
Himalayan red-flanked bush-robin

- (p. 393) Himalayan red-flanked bush-robin (Tarsiger rufilatus) is split from red-flanked bluetail (T. cyanurus)
- (p. 396) Andaman shama (Copsychus albiventris) is split from white-rumped shama (C. malabaricus)
- (p. 400) White-bellied blue robin (Myiomela albiventris) is split from Nilgiri blue robin (M. major)
- (p. 407) Red-tailed wheatear Oenanthe chrysopygia is split from rufous-tailed wheatear (Oe. xanthoprymna)
- (pp. 415–6) Bhutan laughingthrush (Trochalopteron imbricatum) is split from streaked laughingthrush (T. lineatum)
- (pp. 417–8) Assam laughingthrush (Trochalopteron chrysopterum) is split from red-headed laughingthrush (T. erythrocephalum)
- (p. 433) Long-billed wren-babbler (Rimator malacoptilus) is regarded as a monotypic species, separate from the two southeast Asian taxa R. albostriatus and R. pasquieri
- (p. 435-6) Long-tailed wren-babbler (Spelaeornis chocolatinus) is split into three species, grey-bellied wren-babbler (S. reptatus), Chin Hills wren-babbler (S. oatesi) and Naga wren-babbler (S. chocolatinus sensu stricto)
- (p. 438) Cachar wedge-billed babbler (Sphenocichla roberti) is split from wedge-billed babbler (S. humei)
- (pp. 443–4) Afghan babbler (Turdoides huttoni) is split from common babbler (T. caudata)
- (p. 449) Indian white-hooded babbler (Gampsorhynchus rufulus) is split from white-hooded babbler (G. torquatus)
- (p. 454) Manipur fulvetta (Alcippe manipurensis) is split from streak-throated fulvetta, (A. cinereiceps)
- (p. 471) Hill prinia (Prinia superciliaris) is split from black-throated prinia (P. atrogularis)
- (p. 483) Hume's bush-warbler (Cettia brunnescens) is split from yellowish-bellied bush-warbler (C. acanthizoides)
- (p. 485) Baikal bush-warbler (Bradypterus davidi) is split from spotted bush-warbler (B. thoracicus)

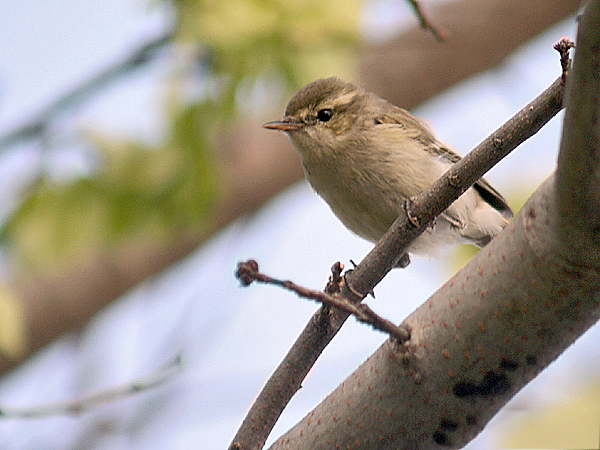
Greenish warbler

- (p. 503) Green warbler (Phylloscopus nitidus) and two-barred warbler (Ph. plumbeitarsus) are both split from greenish warbler (Ph. trochiloides)
- (p. 529) Indian yellow tit (Parus aplonotus) is split from black-lored yellow tit (P. xanthogenys)
- (p. 536) Chestnut-bellied nuthatch (Sitta castanea) is split into two or three species: chestnut-bellied nuthatch sensu stricto (S. cinnamoventris), Indian nuthatch (S. castanea sensu stricto) and a possible third species in south-east Asia S. (castanea) neglecta
- (pp. 537–8) Przewalsky's nuthatch (Sitta przewalskii) is split from white-cheeked nuthatch (S. leucopsis)
- (p. 545) Plain flowerpecker (Dicaeum concolor), split into three species: Andaman flowerpecker D. virescens, plain flowerpecker sensu stricto (D. minullum) and Nilgiri flowerpecker (D. concolor sensu stricto)
- (p. 547) Van Hasselt's sunbird (Leptocoma brasiliana) is split from purple-throated sunbird (L. sperata)

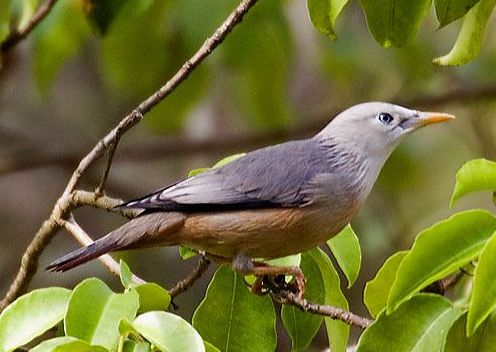
Malabar white-headed starling

- (p. 554) House bunting (Emberiza sahari) and striolated bunting (E. striolata) are regarded as separate species
- (p. 566) Sharpe's rosefinch (Carpodacus verreauxii) is split from spot-winged rosefinch (C. rodopeplus)
- (p. 566) Blyth's rosefinch (Carpodacus grandis) is split from red-mantled rosefinch (C. rhodochlamys)
- (p. 567) Spotted great rosefinch (Carpodacus severtzovi) is split from Caucasian great rosefinch (C. rubicilla)
- (p. 581) Malabar white-headed starling (Sturnia blythii) is split from grey-headed starling (S. malabarica)
- (p. 586) Indian golden oriole (Oriolus kundoo) is split from European golden oriole (O. oriolus)
- (p. 593) Ceylon crested drongo (Dicrurus lophorinus) is split from greater racket-tailed drongo (D. paradiseus)
- (pp. 596–7) Larger-spotted nutcracker (Nucifraga multipunctata) is split from spotted nutcracker (N. caryocatactes)

=== New South Asian endemic birds ===
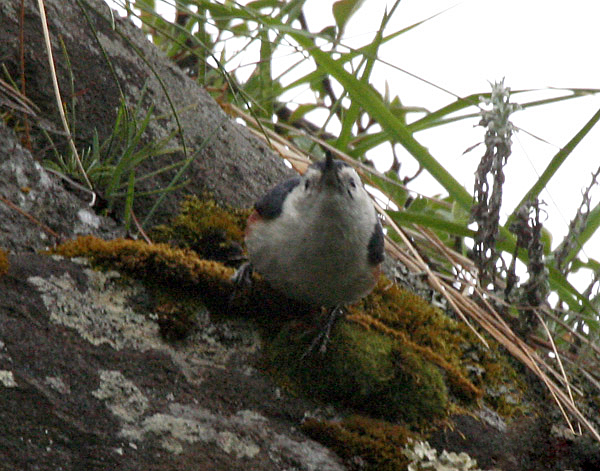
White-cheeked nuthatch

The taxonomic changes proposed increase the number of South Asian endemic bird species, and the numbers of restricted-range endemic bird species in several of South Asia's Endemic Bird Areas. Using the taxonomic arrangements in Birds of South Asia, the following species are additional South Asian endemics: Ceylon bay owl, hill swallow, white-bellied and orange minivets, square-tailed black bulbul, Jerdon's leafbird, Indian blackbird, large blue flycatcher, common babbler and Indian and white-cheeked nuthatches; the following are additional Indian endemics: crested hawk-eagle, grey-fronted green pigeon, Malabar barbet, Malabar woodshrike, flame-throated bulbul, Nilgiri thrush, white-bellied blue robin, Naga wren-babbler, Indian yellow tit, Nilgiri flowerpecker and Malabar white-headed starling; the following are new Sri Lankan endemics: Ceylon green-pigeon, Ceylon small barbet, crimson-backed flameback, Ceylon swallow, Ceylon woodshrike, black-capped bulbul, Ceylon scaly thrush and Ceylon crested drongo; and the following are additional endemics in the Andaman/Nicobar Islands: Nicobar imperial pigeon, Andaman barn-owl, Hume's hawk-owl, Andaman cuckooshrike, Andaman bulbul, Nicobar jungle flycatcher, Andaman shama and Andaman flowerpecker.
