= List of endemic birds of Sri Lanka =

Sri Lanka is home to 35 endemic bird species. The number of bird species recorded in the island is 500+ of which 219 are breeding residents. BirdLife International recognize Sri Lanka as one of the world's Endemic Bird Areas (EBAs). The number of endemic species has changed over the years. This is largely due to "close taxonomic revisions". The number of endemic species has fluctuated from 20 to 47. Since 1977 the number has settled at around 21. The figure was increased to 23 in 1990. Many authorities have accepted this figure since then. Wijesinghe published A Checklist of the Birds of Sri Lanka in 1994 which considered the addition of three more species, but this move did not receive widespread recognition because its rationale was not in keeping with rigorous taxonomic practice. Subsequent publications on the avifauna of Sri Lanka and the South Asia region have not listed these three as endemics. However, within some Sri Lankan circles considered the endemics proposed by Wijesinghe as acceptable. This may be due to an over-enthusiasm in increasing endemic numbers to create a better ornithological image and increase the demand for commercial birdwatching.

In 2004, Deepal Warakagoda and Pamela C. Rasmussen described a new bird species, the Serendib scops-owl (Otus thilohofmanni). This is the first new bird species discovered in Sri Lanka since 1868, when the Sri Lanka whistling thrush (Myophonus blighi) was described. There are some proposals for species level taxonomic revisions, and therefore endemic status in Sri Lanka. The country prefix "Sri Lanka" in common names is normally restricted to endemic species. However Sarath Kotagama et al. (2006) disagree with Sibley and Monroe (1990) on the use of "Ceylon" in common species' names, suggesting instead that they should reflect the change of the official English name of the island from Ceylon to name Sri Lanka. Sibley and Monroe's rationale was "Ceylon" is the geographical unit and "Sri Lanka" is the country which occupies the island. The geographical name is normally used for animal ranges, for example Madagascar is used rather than its nation, the Malagasy Republic."

== Change in number of endemics ==
Year	Number of species	Reference	Comment
1872	37	Holdsworth – Catalogue of Birds found in Ceylon	
1880	47	Legge – A History of Birds of Ceylon	Included 17 species in the present list
1931	25	Wait – Manual of Birds of Ceylon	Excluded the red-faced malkoha
1944	22	Whistler – Avifaunal Survey of Ceylon	
1946	20	Ripley – Comments to Endemic Birds of Ceylon	Grey hornbill, rufous babbler and red-faced malkoha were excluded
1952	21	Phillips – Revised Checklist of Birds of Ceylon	Red-faced malkoha and Ceylon grackle included
1975	20	Phillips – Revised Checklist of Birds of Ceylon	Black-capped bulbul excluded
1977	21	Flemming – Notes On Endemic Birds of Ceylon	Rufous babbler included
1978	21	Phillips – Revised Checklist of Birds of Ceylon	
1990	23+1	Sibley & Monroe – Distribution and Taxonomy of Birds of the World	Crimson-fronted barbet suggested as endemic
1994	23+1	Kotagama and Fernando – A Field Guide to the Birds of Sri Lanka	Follow Sibley and Monroe
1994	23+3	Wijesinghe – A Checklist of the Birds of Sri Lanka	Three species are suggested as endemic
1996	23+3	Inskip et al. – An Annotated Checklist of the Birds of the Oriental Region	Follow Sibley and Monroe refers to Wijesinghe
1998	23	Grimmett et al. – Birds of the Indian Subcontinent	
1999	23	Harrison – A Field Guide to the Birds of Sri Lanka	
2013	26	Kotagama – A Field Guide to the Birds of Sri Lanka (revised)	Crimson-fronted barbet, pompadour green pigeon and black-capped bulbul included

Source: Kotagama et al., 2013

The number has since increased to 35 with the Sri Lanka shama (Copsychus leggei) being split from white-rumped shama (Copsychus malabaricus) in 2022.

== Endemic species ==
Low vulnerability

Least concern
Near threatened

Threatened

Vulnerable
Endangered

Common name	Binomial	Family	Habitat, abundance, distribution	Status
Order Galliformes
Sri Lanka spurfowl	Galloperdix bicalcarata (Forster, 1781)	Phasianidae	Humid forests. Common. All zones, except northern region.	
Sri Lanka junglefowl	Gallus lafayetii (Lesson, 1831)	Phasianidae	Forests, scrub jungles. Very common. All zones.	
Order Columbiformes
Sri Lanka wood pigeon	Columba torringtoniae (Kelaart, 1853)	Columbidae	Forests, gardens. Restricted range. Hill country. Descends to low country wet zone during fruiting seasons.	
Sri Lanka green pigeon	Treron pompadora (Gmelin, JF, 1789)	Columbidae		
Order Psittaciformes
Sri Lanka hanging parrot	Loriculus beryllinus (Pennant, 1781)	Psittacidae	Forests, gardens. Common. All zones. More common in wet zone.	
Layard's parakeet	Psittacula calthrapae (Blyth, 1849)	Psittacidae	Forests, gardens. Common. Wet zone and some riparian forests dry zone.	
Order Cuculiformes
Red-faced malkoha	Phaenicophaeus pyrrhocephalus (Pennant, 1769)	Cuculidae	Forests. Confined to undisturbed forest areas in the wet zone and riparian forests of the dry zone. Restricted location. All zones.	
Green-billed coucal	Centropus chlororhynchos (Blyth, 1849)	Cuculidae	Undisturbed forests. Associated with bamboo and cane rushes. Restricted range. Low country wet zone and wet foothills.	
Order Strigiformes
Serendib scops owl	Otus thilohoffmanni (Warakagoda & Rasmussen, 2004)	Strigidae	Restricted range. Low country wet zone.	
Chestnut-backed owlet	Glaucidium castanotum (Blyth, 1851)	Strigidae	Forests, scrubs, cultivations. Restricted range. Wet zone and hill country.	
Order Bucerotiformes
Sri Lanka grey hornbill	Ocyceros gingalensis (Shaw, 1812)	Bucerotidae	Forests, gardens. Very common. All zones. Most plentiful in dry zone.	
Order Piciformes
Crimson-backed flameback	Chrysocolaptes stricklandi (Layard, 1854)	Picidae		
Red-backed flameback	Dinopium psarodes (Lichtenstein, AAH, 1793)	Picidae		
Yellow-fronted barbet	Psilopogon flavifrons (Cuvier, 1816)	Megalaimidae	Forests, home gardens. Very common. More common in hill country.	
Crimson-fronted barbet	Psilopogon rubricapillus (Gmelin, JF, 1788)	Megalaimidae		
Order Passeriformes
Suborder Passeri: Songbirds
Sri Lanka blue magpie	Urocissa ornata (Wagler, 1829)	Corvidae	Undisturbed forests. Restricted range. Wet zone.	
Black-capped bulbul	Rubigula melanicterus (Gmelin, JF, 1789)	Pycnonotidae		
Yellow-eared bulbul	Pycnonotus penicillatus (Blyth, 1851)	Pycnonotidae	Forests, gardens close to forest, Common. Hill country.	
Sri Lanka drongo	Dicrurus lophorinus (Vieillot, 1817)	Dicruridae		
Sri Lanka bush warbler	Elaphrornis palliseri (Blyth, 1851)	Sylviidae	Forest undergrowth. Restricted range. Hill country.	
Brown-capped babbler	Pellorneum fuscocapillus (Blyth, 1849)	Timaliidae	Forests, scrub jungles. Ground level. Common. All zones.	
Sri Lanka scimitar babbler	Pomatorhinus melanurus (Blyth, 1847)	Timaliidae	Forests understory. Common. All zones.	
Orange-billed babbler	Argya rufescens (Blyth, 1847)	Timaliidae	Forests. Common. Wet zone. Less in hill country.	
Ashy-headed laughingthrush	Argya cinereifrons (Blyth, 1851)	Timaliidae	Forests, mainly in understory and on the ground. Common. Wet zone. More in low country.	
Sri Lanka white-eye	Zosterops ceylonensis (Holdsworth, 1872)	Zosteropidae	Forests, gardens, cultivations. Very common. Hill country.	
Sri Lanka myna	Gracula ptilogenys Blyth, 1846	Sturnidae	Forests. Common. Wet zone. More common in Low country.	
White-faced starling	Sturnus albofrontatus (Layard, EL, 1854)	Sturnidae	Forests. Restricted range. Wet zone. Less in hill country.	
Sri Lanka whistling thrush	Myophonus blighi (Holdsworth, 1872)	Turdidae	Undisturbed montane forests, streams. Restricted range. Hill country.	
Spot-winged thrush	Geokichla spiloptera (Blyth, 1847)	Turdidae	Humid forest undergrowth. Common. All zones. More common in wet zone.	
Sri Lanka thrush	Zoothera imbricata Layard, 1854	Turdidae	Forests undergrowth. Common. Hill country, some locations in low country wet zone.	
Dull-blue flycatcher	Eumyias sordida (Walden, 1870)	Muscicapidae	Forests, home gardens, well-wooded ravines. Hill country. Also in humid locations in the low country wet zone.	
Legge's Flowerpecker	Dicaeum vincens (Sclater, PL, 1872)	Dicaeidae	Forests. Common. Low country wet zone and lower hill country.	
Sri Lanka woodshrike	Tephrodornis affinis (Blyth, 1847)	Vangidae		
Sri Lanka swallow	Cecropis hyperythra (Blyth, 1849)	Hirundinidae	A variety of open country habitats in both the lowlands and foothills in Sri Lanka, including farm fields and lightly wooded areas.	
Sri Lanka shama	Copsychus leggei (Whistler, 1941)	Muscicapidae		Not Evaluated
