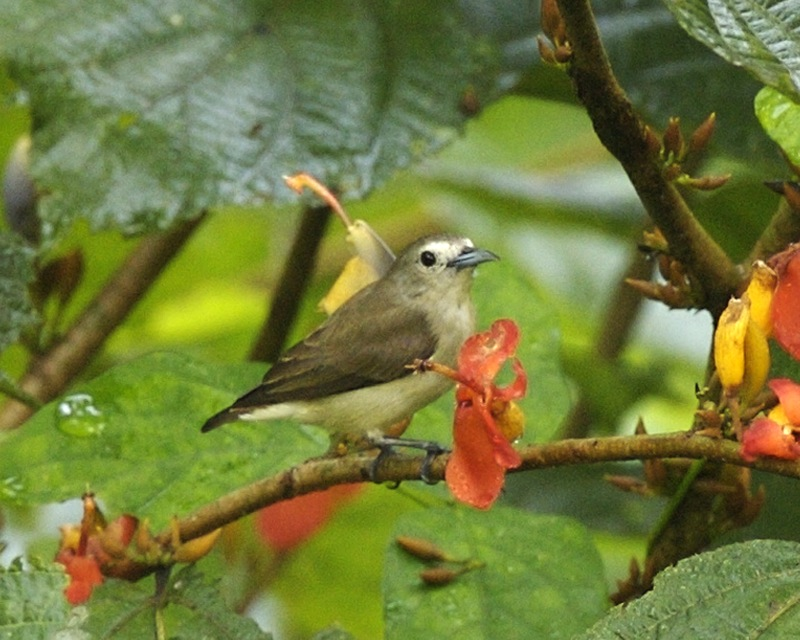
- feeding on Helicteres isora nectar

Conservation status
- Least Concern (IUCN 3.1)

Scientific classification
- Kingdom: Animalia
- Phylum: Chordata
- Class: Aves
- Order: Passeriformes
- Family: Dicaeidae
- Genus: Dicaeum
- Species: D. concolor

Binomial name
- Dicaeum concolor Jerdon, 1840
- Distribution of members in the species complex

= Nilgiri flowerpecker =

Species of bird

The Nilgiri flowerpecker (Dicaeum concolor) is a tiny bird in the flowerpecker family. Formerly a subspecies of what used to be termed as the plain flowerpecker although that name is now reserved for Dicaeum minullum. Like others of the group, it feeds predominantly on nectar and fruits. They forage within the canopy of forests and are found in India. They are non-migratory and the widespread distribution range includes several populations that are non-overlapping and morphologically distinct, some of which are recognized as full species. They are important pollinators and dispersers of mistletoes in forests.

== Description ==
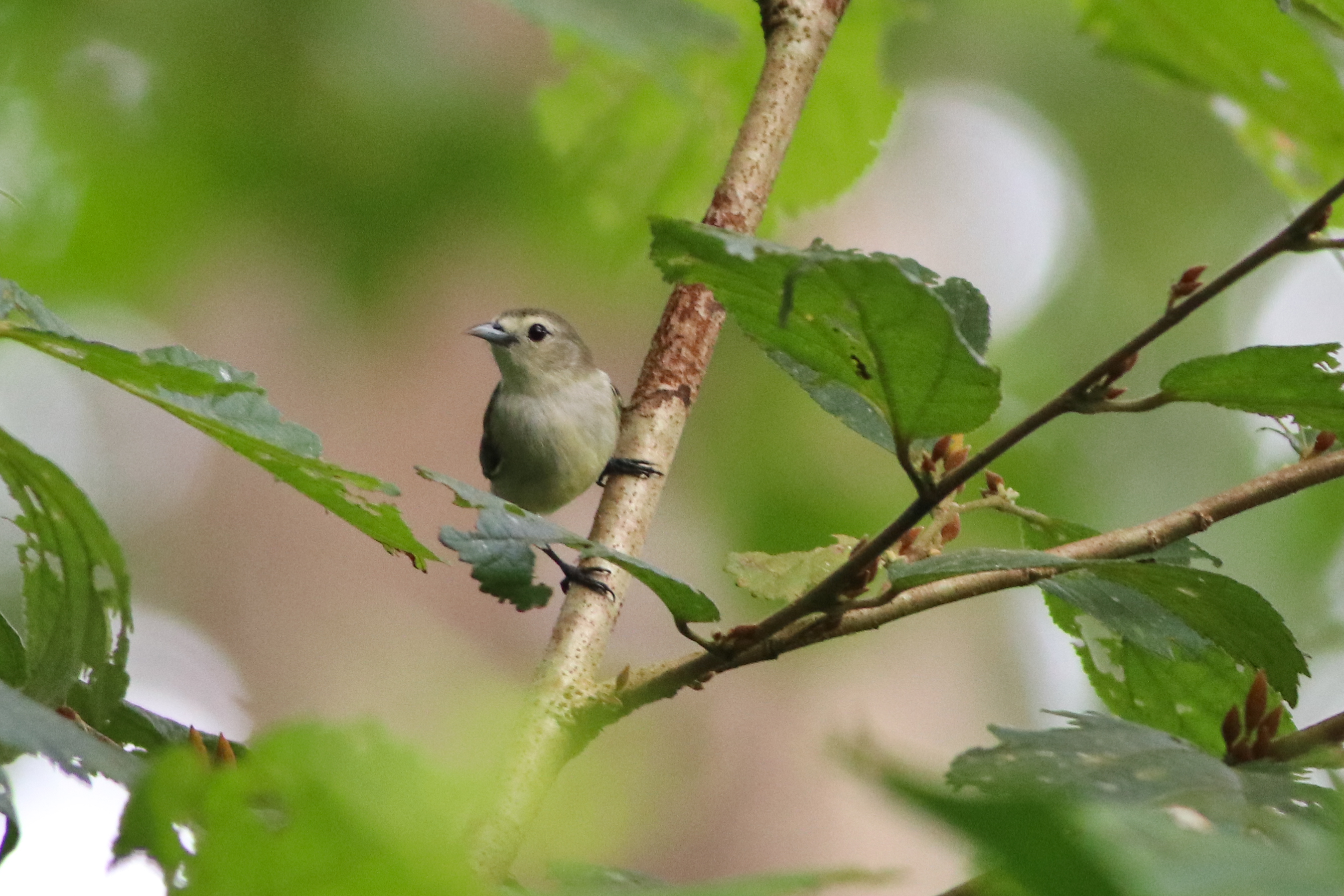
Nligiri flowerpecker from Western Ghats, Kerala

These birds are tiny (9 cm long) and there is no marked difference between the males and females. It is found in hill forests of the Western Ghats and Nilgiri hills of southern India. It is pale brown on the upperside and the underside is whitish. The whitish brow in front of the eye is wider than in Dicaeum erythrorhynchos. This subspecies has been raised to full species by Pamela Rasmussen. The subspecies found in northeastern India, extending into Myanmar, Laos and southern China is called olivaceum by earlier authors but is treated by Rasmussen and other taxonomists now as a separate species Dicaeum minullum (which includes the population minullum from Hainan Island and is now termed as the plain flowerpecker in the more restricted sense). This is very olive above and the black bill is finer and slightly curved. The population found in the Andaman Islands virescens is also considered a separate species Dicaeum virescens (the Andaman flowerpecker) in the newer treatment. This is bright olive-green on the upperside with dark speckling on the crown. The centre of the belly has a bright patch of pale yellow.

== Behaviour and ecology ==
The Nilgiri flowerpecker is a common resident breeding bird of woodland edges, cultivation and isolated stands of trees, often in hilly country. The call of the Nilgiri flowerpecker is a sharp check or a rapid series of ticks, while the song is a high-pitched trill. The breeding season of concolor in the Nilgiris is January to April possibly with a second brood in May and June. Two or three eggs are laid in a purse-like nest suspended from a tree or bush. Like other flowerpeckers they have a feathery tongue that allows them to sip nectar, but they feed on soft berries as well as small insects.

They are important pollinators and dispersers of mistletoes in tropical forests.
