= A Field Guide to the Birds of Hawaii and the Tropical Pacific =

1987 book by Harold Douglas Pratt, Jr., Phillip L. Bruner and Delwyn G. Berrett

- Author: H. Douglas Pratt, Phillip L. Bruner & Delwyn G. Berrett
- Illustrator: H. Douglas Pratt
- Language: English
- Subject: Pacific birds
- Genre: Field guide
- Publisher: Princeton University Press
- Publication date: 1987
- Publication place: United States
- Media type: Print (hardback and softback)
- Pages: xx + 409
- ISBN: 978-0-691-08402-2 (hardback), ISBN 978-0-691-02399-1 (softback)

A Field Guide to the Birds of Hawaii and the Tropical Pacific is a 1987 book by Harold Douglas Pratt, Jr., Phillip L. Bruner and Delwyn G. Berrett (with illustrations by Pratt). It is published by Princeton University Press and is produced as both hardback (ISBN 978-0-691-08402-2) and softback (ISBN 978-0-691-02399-1) editions. The book is primarily a field guide to birds found in the Hawaiian Islands, Micronesia, Fiji and tropical Polynesia (plus some northern subtropical Polynesian islands), including some distribution and status data. It was the first identification work to cover the birds of the whole of this region.

The book is 190 mm (7.5 in) high by 128 mm (5.0 in) wide. It comprises xx + 409 pages, with 45 colour plates (43 of which contain Pratt's illustrations of birds; the remaining two contain photographs of plants important to birds in the region). The main text is divided up into three sections:

- "How to use this book" (pages 3 – 14)
- "A birder's-eye view of the Tropical Pacific" (pages 15 – 44) which contains descriptions of the types of island, their habitats and the bird communities found in them, with some information about bird conservation in the region.
- Individual accounts of 507 species, which make up the bulk of the book's text, between pages 45 and 319

Appendix A (pages 321 - 328) contains a hypothetical list for the region, and Appendix B (pages 329 - 258) a series of species checklists for the individual subdivisions. A map of the region covered is given on pages xvi - xvii, with more detailed maps of individual parts of the region in Appendix C (pages 359 - 372). These appendices are followed by a glossary, bibliography and index.

A list of extinct species is given on page 36, and a number of these are illustrated in the book's artwork section.

The book is dedicated to Dr. Robert J. Newman.
