= Lynx Nature Books =

Spanish ornithological publishing company

- Founder: Ramon Mascort Amigó, Jordi Sargatal, and Josep del Hoyo
- Country of origin: Spain
- Headquarters location: Cerdanyola del Vallès
- Publication types: Books
- Nonfiction topics: Ornithology; Natural history
- Official website: lynxnaturebooks.com

Lynx Nature Books, based in Barcelona, is a publishing company specializing in ornithology and natural history. The company was founded in 1989. It was formerly named Lynx Edicions.

== History ==
Lynx Nature Books was founded as Lynx Edicions in Barcelona by Ramon Mascort Amigó, a lawyer and collector; Jordi Sargatal, a naturalist; and Josep del Hoyo, a medical doctor and writer. The company has been based in the Bellaterra district of Cerdanyola del Vallès since 2002.

== Books ==
Lynx Nature Books publishes the Handbook of the Birds of the World, a 16-volume series completed in 2012 that documents for the first time in a single work an entire animal class, illustrating and treating in detail all the species of that class. No such comprehensive work had been completed before for this or any other group in the animal kingdom. A condensed, single-volume version of the series was published in 2020 as All the Birds of the World.

Similarly, Lynx publishes the Handbook of the Mammals of the World, a nine-volume undertaking like the work on birds published between 2009 and 2019. An updated two-volume set with taxonomic revisions was released in 2020 as the Illustrated Checklist of the Mammals of the World, and a condensed, single-volume version of the series was published in 2023 as All the Mammals of the World.

Lynx, since 2018, has published field guides to birds of various regions; and Birds of South Asia: The Ripley Guide, was published in collaboration with the Smithsonian Institution.

== Internet Bird Collection ==
In 2002, as a complement to the Handbook of the Birds of the World, and with the ultimate goal of disseminating knowledge about the world's avifauna, Lynx Edicions started the Internet Bird Collection (IBC). This was a free-access, online audiovisual library of footage of the world's birds which hosted videos, photographs, and recordings illustrating various biological traits (e.g. subspecies, plumage, feeding, breeding, etc.) for 96% of all bird species. It was a non-profit endeavour fuelled by material from more than one hundred contributors around the world. In 2020 the IBC was incorporated into the Cornell Lab of Ornithology's Macaulay Library, which now hosts all of the content previously stored on the IBC.
