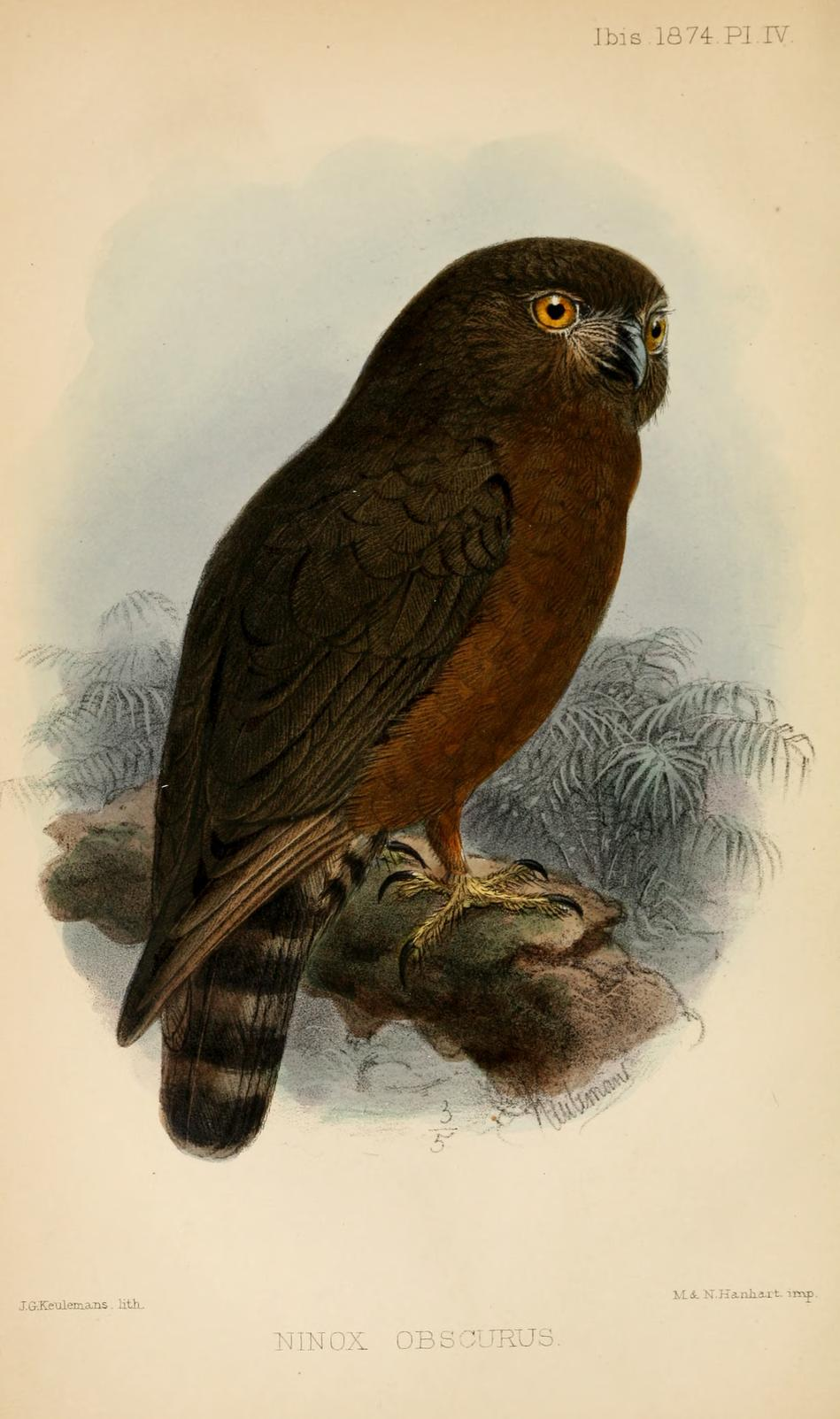

Conservation status
- Least Concern (IUCN 3.1)
- CITES Appendix II

Scientific classification
- Kingdom: Animalia
- Phylum: Chordata
- Class: Aves
- Order: Strigiformes
- Family: Strigidae
- Genus: Ninox
- Species: N. obscura

Binomial name
- Ninox obscura Hume, 1872

= Hume's boobook =

Species of owl

Hume's boobook or Hume's hawk-owl (Ninox obscura) is a species of owl in the family Strigidae endemic to the Andaman Islands. Its natural habitats are subtropical or tropical moist lowland forests and subtropical or tropical mangrove forests. It is becoming rare due to habitat loss.

== Gallery ==
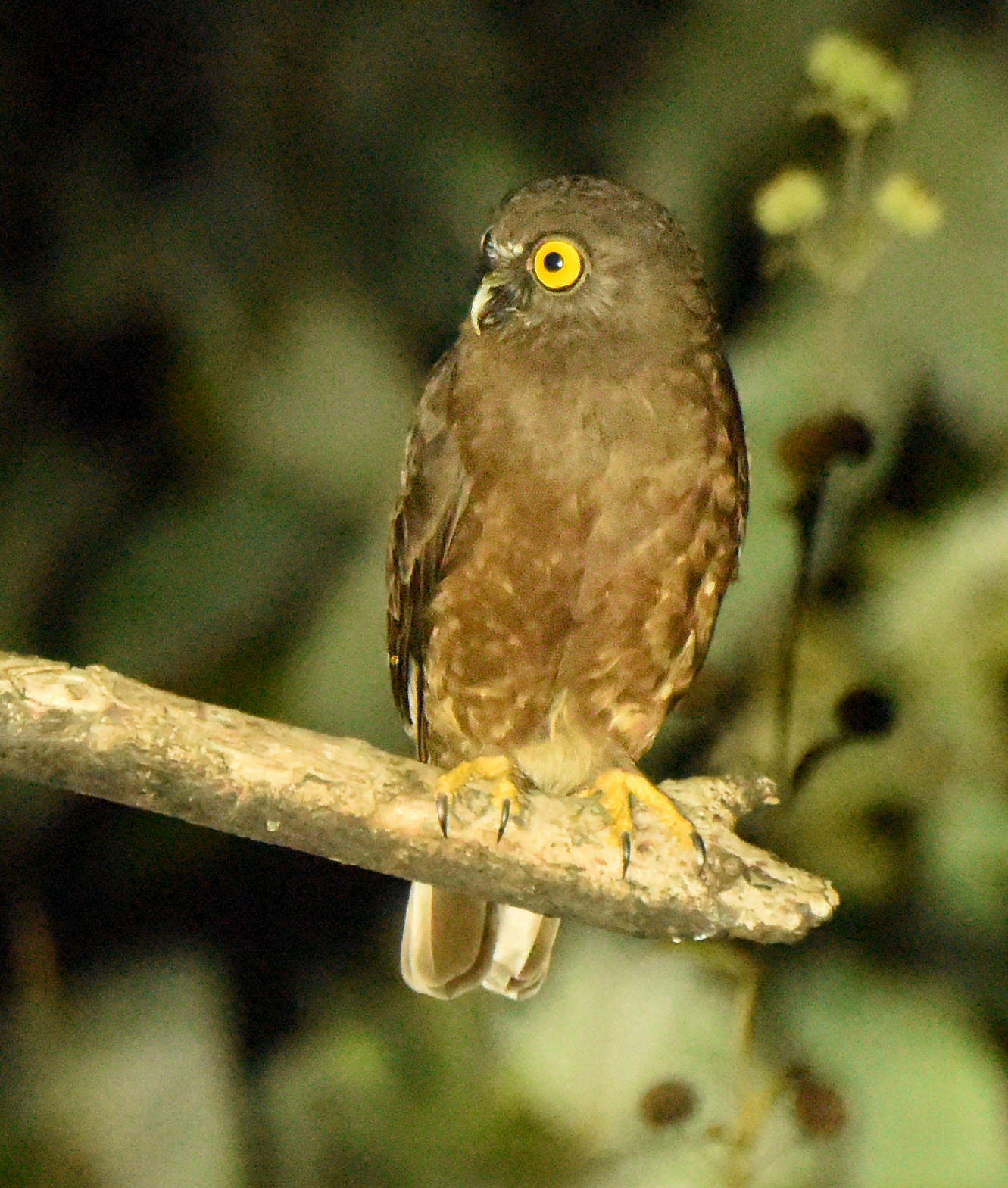

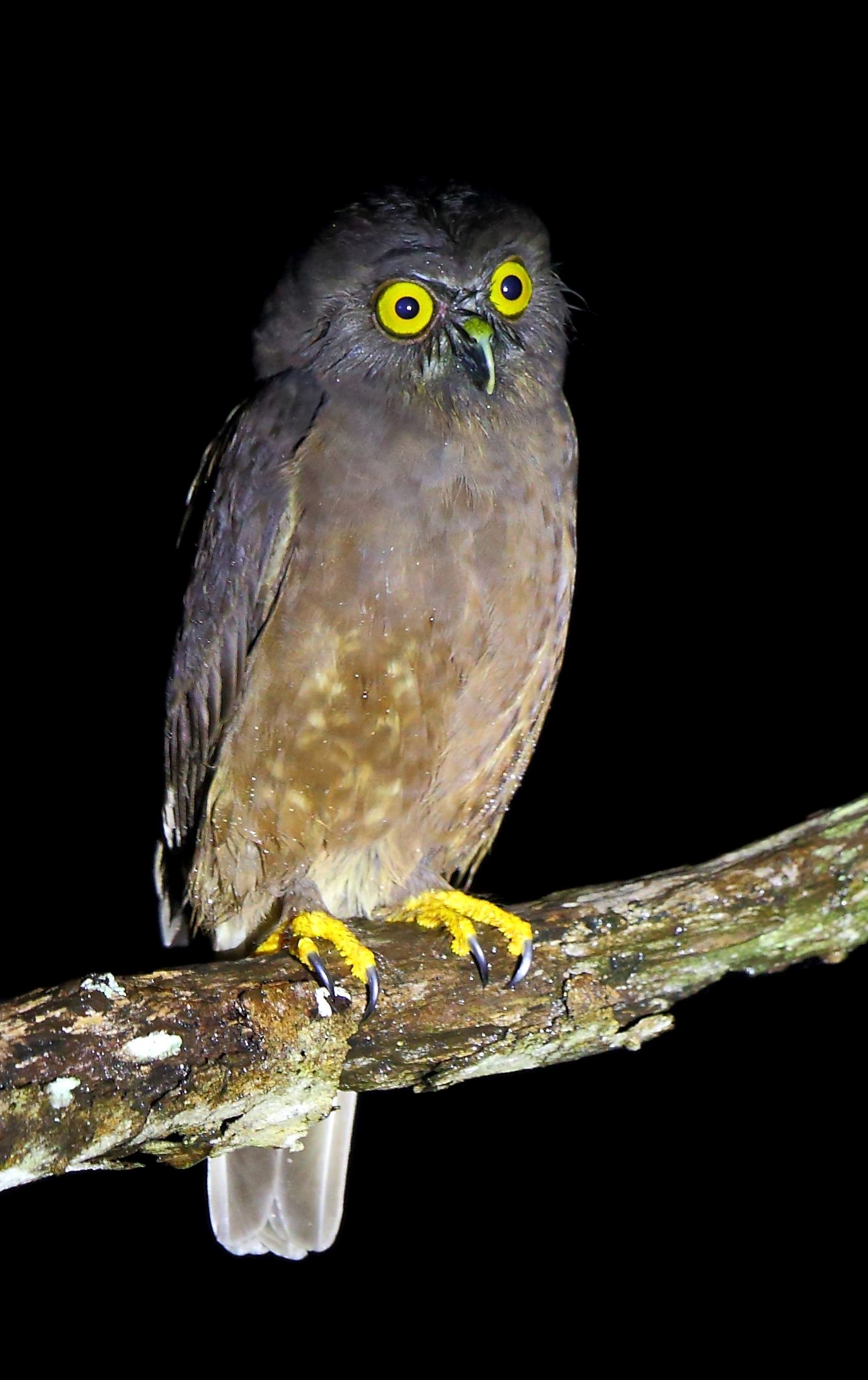
