= Hypothetical list of biota =

A hypothetical list of biota, or "hypothetical list" for short, is a list of taxa (of plants, animals, fungi etc.) which are not recorded from a given geographical area, but which may be found there. Such lists are sometimes included by authors of regional biota, partly to demonstrate that the authors have considered and rejected the taxa in question rather than overlooked them, and partly to encourage researchers and others to seek out the taxa in question so that they can be added to the list of the area's biota in future revisions.

Taxa may be included for different reasons:

- They may be resident close to the region in question, and the region may have habitat which appears suitable
- They may be long-distance vagrants with a pattern of occurrence
- They may be poorly studied taxa, which the authors feel could be found in the region if appropriate search techniques are used
- There may be historical evidence of occurrence which the authors felt was not watertight enough to justify inclusion in a definitive list for the region

A 1973 checklist of fleas in Connecticut added species to its hypothetical list if they were documented in a bordering state and have a host found in Connecticut.

Ornithological works which have included hypothetical lists include the following:

- A field guide to the birds of Hawaii and the Tropical Pacific by Pratt, Bruner and Berrett
- Birds of South Asia. The Ripley Guide by Rasmussen and Anderton
