= Andaman shama =

Conservation status
- Least Concern (IUCN 3.1)

Scientific classification
- Kingdom: Animalia
- Phylum: Chordata
- Class: Aves
- Order: Passeriformes
- Family: Muscicapidae
- Genus: Copsychus
- Species: C. albiventris

Binomial name
- Copsychus albiventris (Blyth, 1858)

Synonyms
- Kittacincla albiventris

Species of bird

The Andaman shama (Copsychus albiventris) is a species of bird in the family Muscicapidae. It is endemic to the Andaman Islands. It is considered a restricted-range species because it occurs only within this island group. It was previously considered a subspecies of the white-rumped shama. Its natural habitats are subtropical or tropical dry forests and subtropical or tropical moist lowland forests. Although precise global population estimates are not available, the species is reported to be common within its limited range. The Andaman shama inhabits forested and semi-open habitats across several islands in the Andaman archipelago and is considered non-migratory.

== Taxonomy ==
The Andaman shama belongs to the family Muscicapidae, a group that includes many small insectivorous passerine birds. The species is classified as monotypic, meaning no subspecies are currently recognized.

== Description ==
The Andaman shama is a small bird with a body shape similar to that of a thrush. Males have tails measuring approximately 117–122 mm, while females have slightly shorter tails measuring about 98–106 mm. Males and females are generally similar in appearance, although females typically show slightly duller coloration around the chin and throat.

The species has white underparts with slightly reddish flanks. The upperparts range from pale orange to warm brown. The central tail feathers are black and extend slightly beyond the white outer tail feathers. Its vocalizations consist of short phrases with a small number of notes and are typically low-pitched.

== Distribution and habitat ==
The Andaman shama has been recorded on at least ten islands within the Andaman archipelago. It occurs in dense forest, scrub, gardens, and vegetated ravines, often near water sources.

The species has not been recorded on islands smaller than approximately 3.6 km². It is considered sedentary and does not undertake seasonal migrations. The species also occurs in areas influenced by human land use, including agricultural land, livestock grazing areas, and urban environments.

== Behavior and breeding ==
Published information on the general behavior of the Andaman shama is limited, and details of its diet remain poorly documented.

Breeding typically occurs between late May and late June. Nests are constructed from grass and dry bamboo leaves and are lined with softer materials such as roots, twigs, and rhizomorphs. They are usually placed in broken tree stumps or crevices less than three meters above the ground. Females typically lay two to three greenish eggs marked with purple-brown or grey spotting.

== Conservation status ==
The Andaman shama is classified as a restricted-range species because it occurs only within the Andaman Islands. Although it is reported to be common within its range, the species' limited geographic distribution means that habitat change within the islands may influence its population. Parts of its habitat occur in areas affected by agriculture and urban development.
