= Nicobar imperial pigeon =

Conservation status
- Near Threatened (IUCN 3.1)

Scientific classification
- Kingdom: Animalia
- Phylum: Chordata
- Class: Aves
- Order: Columbiformes
- Family: Columbidae
- Genus: Ducula
- Species: D. nicobarica

Binomial name
- Ducula nicobarica (Pelzeln, 1865)

Synonyms
- Carpophaga aenea var. nicobarica von Pelzeln, 1865; Ducula aenea nicobarica

Species of bird

The Nicobar imperial pigeon (Ducula nicobarica) is a species of bird in the family Columbidae. It is endemic to the Nicobar Islands. Its natural habitats are lowland forests, but it also feeds on fruiting trees in agricultural landscapes.

This species was formerly treated as subspecies of the green imperial pigeon (Ducula aenea). It is now considered as a separate species based on the big differences in both plumage and vocalization compared to all other green imperial pigeon subspecies.
