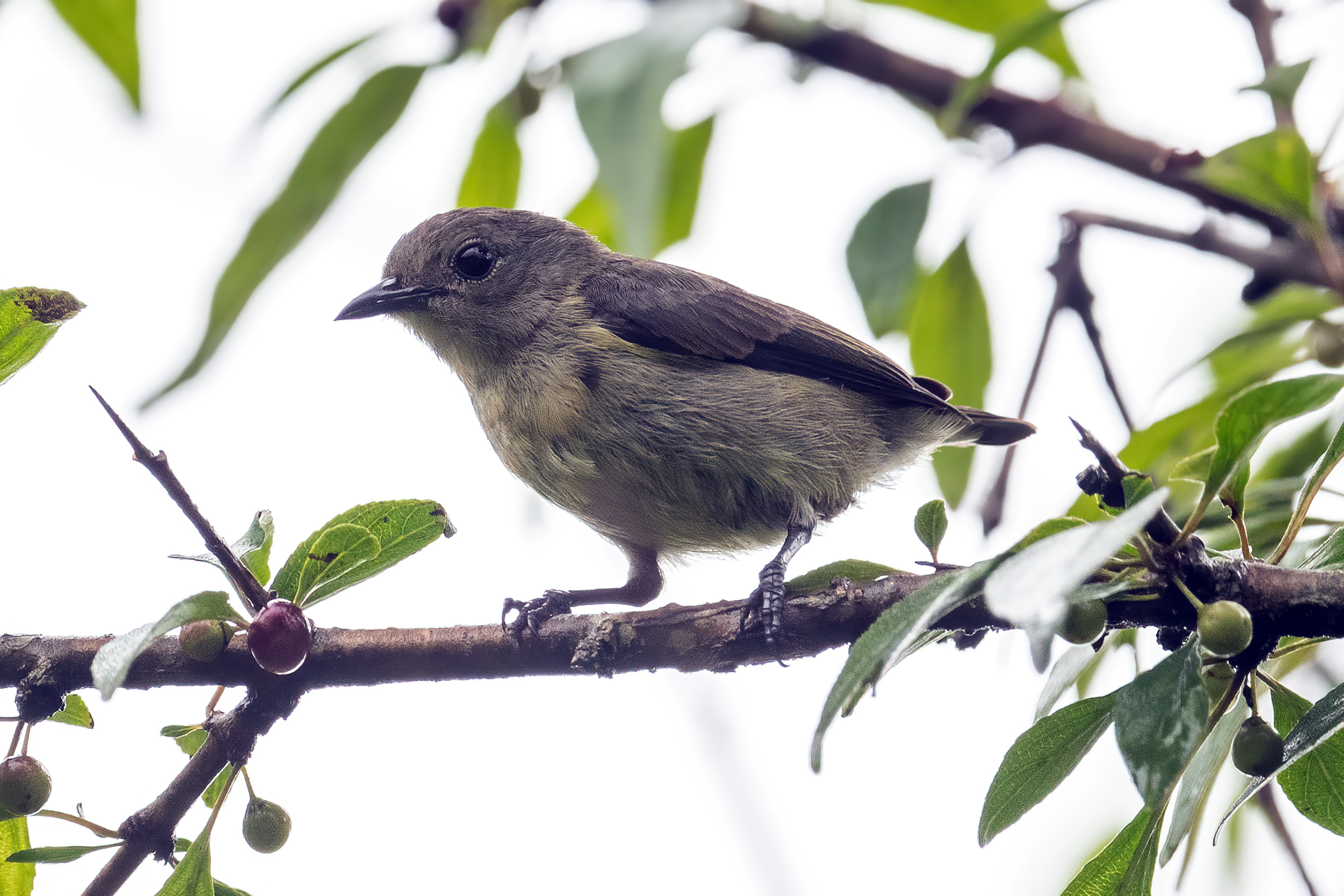
- At Nagarkot, Nepal

Conservation status
- Least Concern (IUCN 3.1)

Scientific classification
- Kingdom: Animalia
- Phylum: Chordata
- Class: Aves
- Order: Passeriformes
- Family: Dicaeidae
- Genus: Dicaeum
- Species: D. minullum

Binomial name
- Dicaeum minullum R. Swinhoe, 1870

= Plain flowerpecker =

Species of bird

The plain flowerpecker (Dicaeum minullum) is a bird in the family Dicaeidae. The species was described and given its binomial name by Robert Swinhoe in 1870. It is found in the central Himalayas, through western Indonesia to Taiwan.

== Description ==
These birds are tiny (9 cm long) and there is no marked difference between the males and females. The subspecies found in northeastern India, extending into Myanmar, Laos and southern China is called olivaceum by earlier authors but is treated by Pamela C. Rasmussen as a separate species Dicaeum minullum (which includes the population minullum from Hainan Island and is now termed as the plain flowerpecker in the more restricted sense).

== Behaviour and ecology ==
Its natural habitat is subtropical or tropical moist lowland forests. Like many flowerpeckers, it favours mistletoe for foraging.
