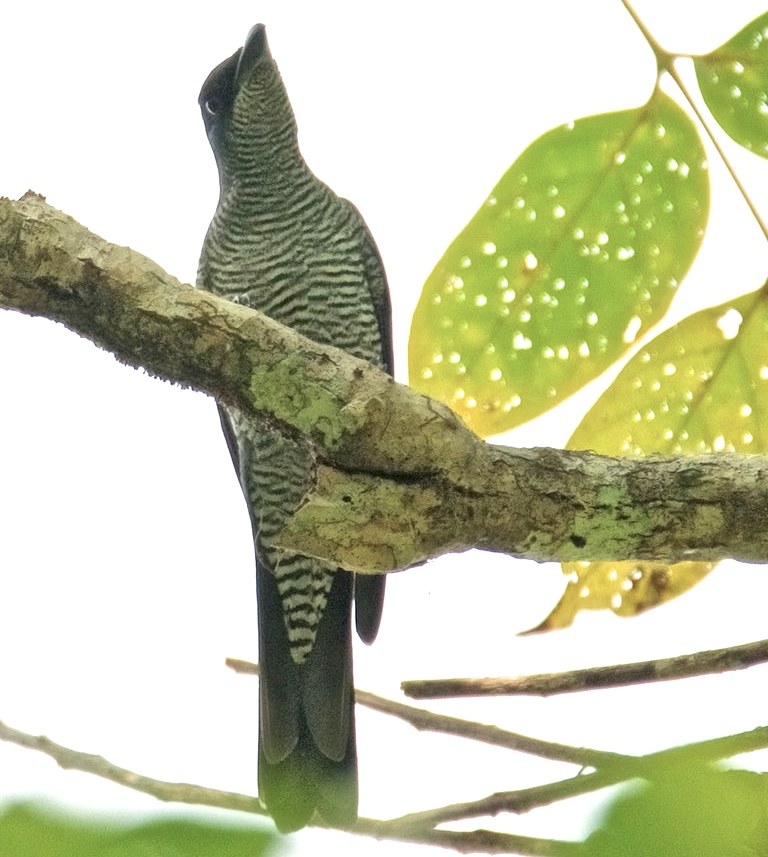

Conservation status
- Near Threatened (IUCN 3.1)

Scientific classification
- Kingdom: Animalia
- Phylum: Chordata
- Class: Aves
- Order: Passeriformes
- Family: Campephagidae
- Genus: Coracina
- Species: C. dobsoni

Binomial name
- Coracina dobsoni (Ball, 1872)

Synonyms
- Graucalus Dobsoni (protonym)

= Andaman cuckooshrike =

Species of bird

The Andaman cuckooshrike (Coracina dobsoni) is a species of bird in the family Campephagidae. It is endemic to the Andaman Islands. It was formerly considered a subspecies of the bar-bellied cuckooshrike.

== Taxonomy ==
The species was named after George Edward Dobson.
