= Pamela C. Rasmussen =

American ornithologist (born 1959)

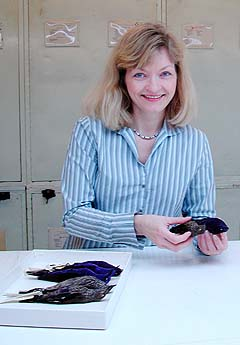
- Born: October 16, 1959 (age 67)
- Education: Walla Walla University (MS); University of Kansas (PhD)
- Scientific career
- Fields: Ornithology
- Workplaces: Smithsonian Institution; Michigan State University

Pamela Cecile Rasmussen (born October 16, 1959) is an American ornithologist and expert on Asian birds. She was formerly a research associate at the Smithsonian Institution in Washington, D.C., and is based at the Michigan State University. She is associated with other major centers of research in the United States and the United Kingdom.

Rasmussen's early research investigated South American seabirds and fossil birds from North America. She later specialised in Asian birds describing several new species and clarifying the status of others, particularly white-eyes and owls. More recently, she has been involved in large scale collaborations looking at patterns of global biodiversity, and has assessed the taxonomic status of South Asian vultures.

She was the main author of Birds of South Asia: The Ripley Guide, a landmark publication due to its greater geographical and species coverage compared to its predecessors. As a result of her study of museum bird specimens when researching for the book, she was instrumental in unveiling the extent of the theft from museums and fraudulent documentation perpetrated by eminent British ornithologist Richard Meinertzhagen.

== Early life and career ==
Pamela Rasmussen is the daughter of Helen Rasmussen, a Seventh-day Adventist, whose husband, Chester Murray Rasmussen, a doctor, had left the family when Pamela and her sisters were young. Her interest in birds started when her mother bought her the junior edition of Oliver Austin's Birds of the World, and Pamela subsequently always chose to receive bird books as presents.

She took her M.S. in 1983 at Walla Walla University, an Adventist-affiliated university in southeast Washington, and her Ph.D. at the University of Kansas in 1990. At Kansas, she studied blue-eyed shags, and was introduced to evolutionary theory, which had not been taught at her alma mater.

Rasmussen is a visiting assistant professor of zoology, and assistant museum curator of mammalogy and ornithology, at Michigan State University (MSU), having formerly been a research associate for the eminent American ornithologist S. Dillon Ripley at the Smithsonian Institution in Washington, D.C. She is a member of the American Ornithological Society (AOS) North American Classification Committee (NACC), a scientific associate with the bird group of the British Natural History Museum zoology section at Tring, and an associate editor of The Ibis, the scientific journal of the British Ornithologists' Union. She is a scientific affiliate for the Field Museum of Natural History and the founder and editor of AVoCet, MSU's avian vocalizations center. In 2020 she replaced the ornithologist Frank Gill as an editor of the IOC World Bird List, an online list maintained on behalf of the International Ornithologists' Union.

Rasmussen is married to Michael D. Gottfried, who is Curator of Paleontology, Associate Professor of Geology, and Director of the Center for Integrative Studies in General Science at MSU.

=== Research highlights ===
==== South American seabirds ====
Rasmussen's early work was largely focused on studies of the systematics, ecology and behaviour of Patagonian seabirds, notably cormorants. She studied plumage variations in juvenile blue-eyed, king and red-legged cormorants, and used plumage and behavioural patterns to establish relationships between king and blue-eyed shags. She also reviewed the fishing activity of olivaceous cormorants.

==== Asian birds ====
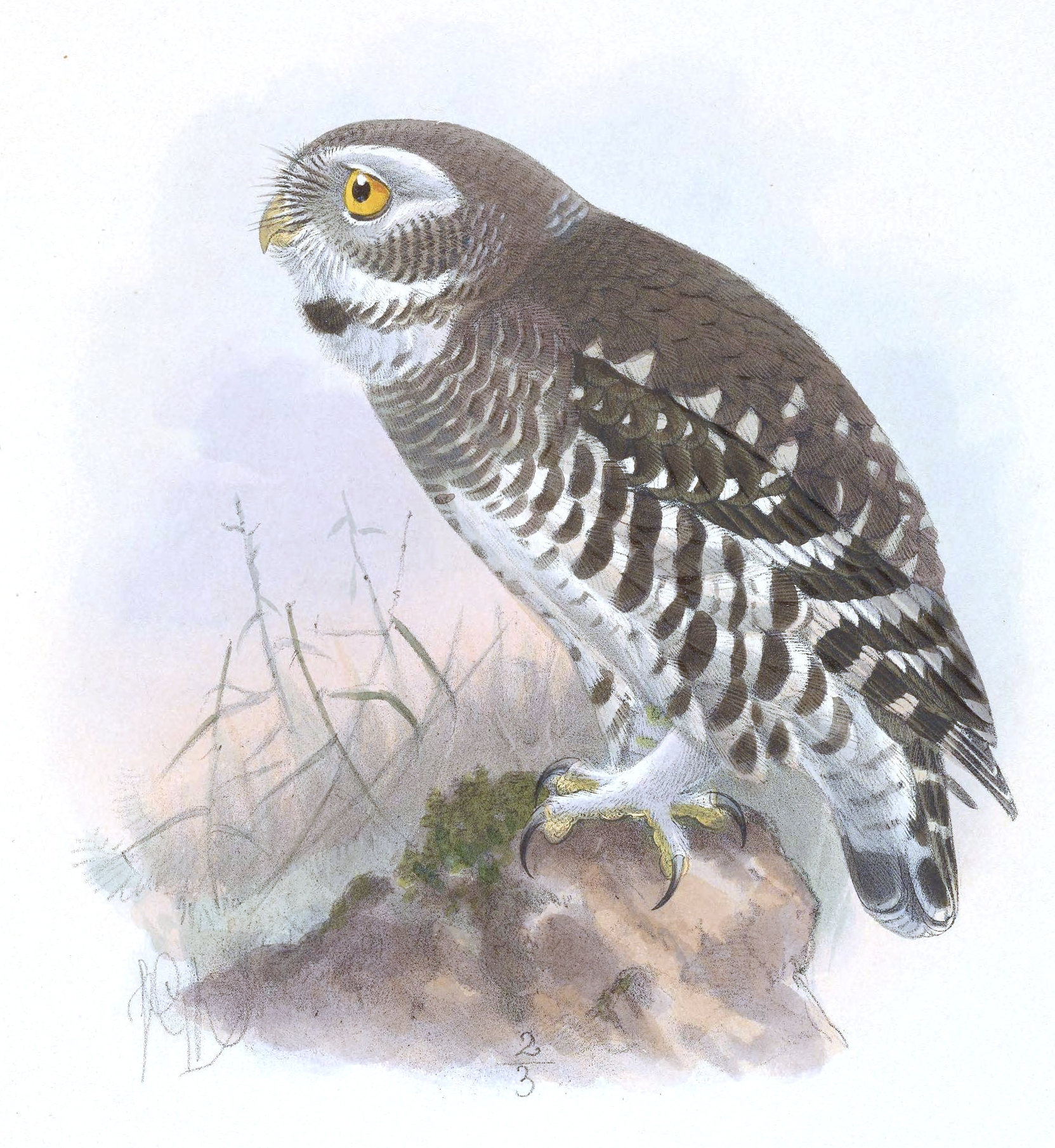
An 1891 painting of the forest owlet, which was rediscovered by Rasmussen in 1997

Rasmussen described four new Asian bird species from her study of museum specimens. The Nicobar scops owl Otus alius, the Sangihe scops owl Otus collari, and the cinnabar hawk owl Ninox ios, a Sulawesi endemic, all in 1998, and the Taiwan bush-warbler Bradypterus alishanensis in 2000. She rediscovered the forest owlet Athene blewitti, which had not been seen since 1884, in western India, previous searches by S. Dillon Ripley, Salim Ali and others having failed because they relied on fake documentation from Richard Meinertzhagen. In November 1997, Rasmussen and Ben King of the American Museum of Natural History spent ten days unsuccessfully searching two east Indian locations before driving west to the site of another old specimen, where King spotted a small, chunky owl with short, heavily white-feathered legs and huge claws, which Rasmussen confirmed as the target species whilst the owl was videotaped and photographed.

With her colleagues, she clarified the taxonomy of Indonesian white-eyes, establishing the specific status of the Sangihe white-eye Zosterops nehrkorni and the Seram white-eye Z. stalkeri and confirmed the identity of the Serendib scops owl which had originally been discovered in Sri Lanka by local ornithologist Deepal Warakagoda.

The Togian white-eye, identified as a new species by Rasmussen and her colleagues in 2008

The imperial pheasant is a rare bird found in the forests of Vietnam and Laos. Rasmussen and her co-workers used morphology, hybridisation experiments, and DNA analysis to show that this pheasant, previously thought critically endangered, is actually a naturally occurring hybrid between the Vietnamese pheasant Lophura hatinhensis and the subspecies annamensis of the silver pheasant L. nycthemera.

A 2008 paper saw a return to white-eye taxonomy with the formal description of the Togian white-eye Zosterops somadikartai, an endemic species of the Togian Islands of Indonesia, which, unlike most of its relatives, lacks the white ring around the eye which give this group of birds its name. Rasmussen noted that the Togian white-eye is distinctive not only in its appearance, but also in its lilting song, which sounds higher pitched and is less varied in frequency than the songs of its close relatives.

Pamela Rasmussen's interest in Asian birds led to her involvement in more specifically conservation-directed projects. Two Gyps vultures, the Indian white-rumped vulture, Gyps bengalensis, and the "long-billed vulture" suffered a 99 percent population decrease in South Asia due to poisoning by diclofenac, a veterinary drug that causes kidney failure in birds that have eaten the carcasses of treated cattle. Rasmussen showed that there are two distinct species of long-billed vulture: the Indian vulture G. indicus and slender-billed vulture G. tenuirostris. This is important to conservation, since a captive-breeding program has been established to assist the recovery of at-risk vulture species.

==== Biodiversity ====
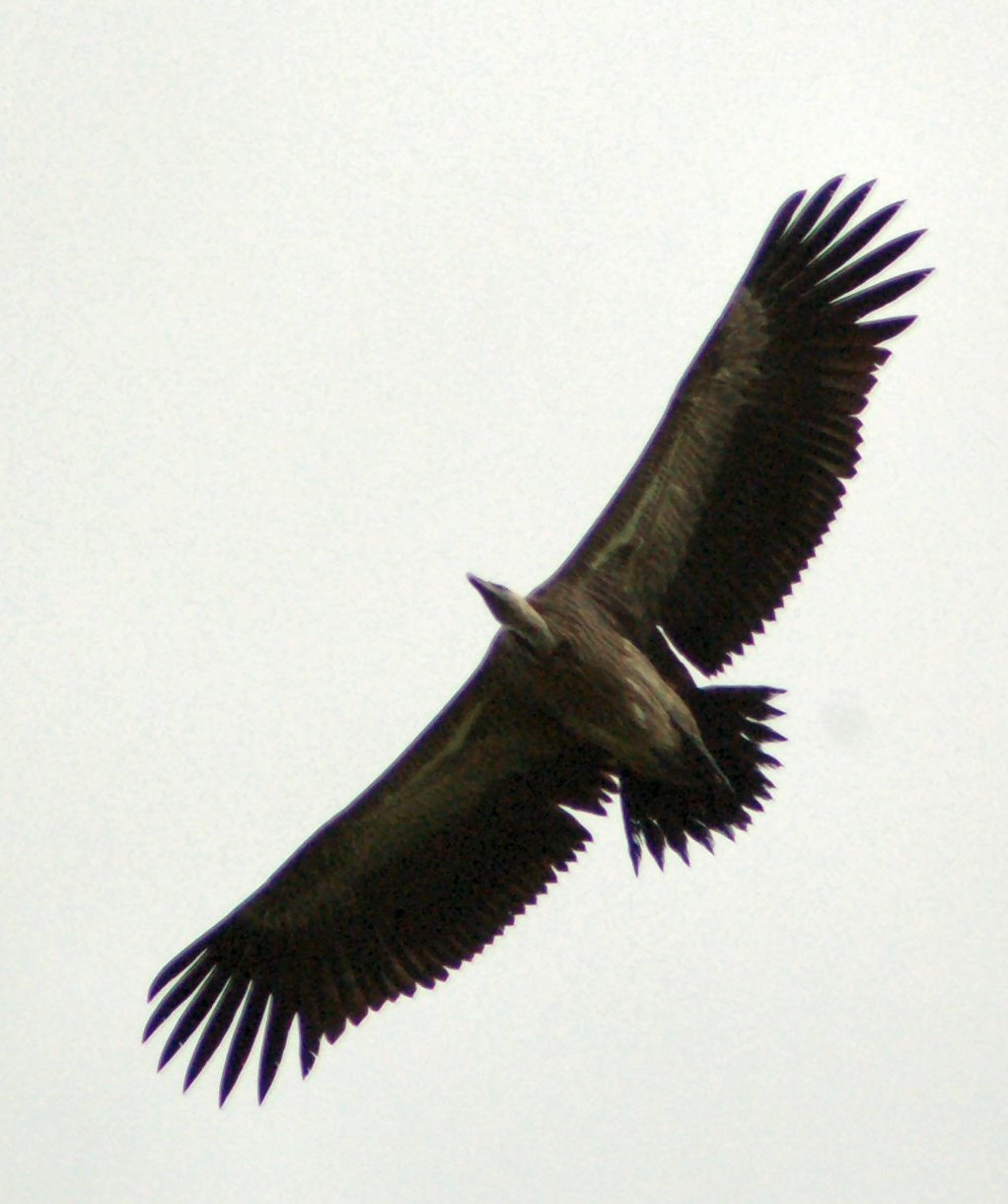
Indian vulture, a vulnerable species newly split as a result of Rasmussen's research into the genus Gyps

In 2005, Rasmussen was part of a large multi-institutional collaboration investigating biodiversity hotspots, which have a prominent role in conservation. The study assessed locations quantitatively for three criteria of bird diversity – species richness, the level of threat, and the number of endemic species. The results demonstrated that hotspots did not show the same geographical distribution for each factor. Only 2.5% of hotspot areas are common to all three aspects of diversity, with over 80% of hotspots registering on only one criterion. Each criterion explained less than 24% of the variation in the other factors, suggesting that even within a single taxonomic class, different mechanisms are responsible for the origin and maintenance of various aspects of diversity. Consequently, the different types of hotspots also vary greatly in their utility as conservation tools.

Rasmussen's recent work has concentrated on further large-scale collaborations with the same group of institutions studying global patterns in biodiversity. A survey of species richness and geographical range size did not show the decrease in range size from temperate regions to the tropics that had been previously assumed; although that pattern was largely true in the northern hemisphere, it did not appear to apply in the southern hemisphere. Research evaluating the relationship between extinction and human impact showed that, after controlling for species richness, the best predictors of the global pattern of extinction risk are measures of human impact, with ecological factors being of secondary importance. An examination of the distribution of rare and threatened vertebrate species, showed differing patterns for bird, mammal and amphibian species, which has consequences for hotspot-based conservation strategies.

Other studies by Rasmussen and her international colleagues looked at the importance of energy availability, and a 2007 paper showed that global patterns of spatial turnover are driven principally by widespread species rather than restricted ones. This complements other work, and helps to establish a unified model of how terrestrial biodiversity varies both within and between the Earth's major land masses.

==== Paleo ornithology ====
A fossil site at a borrow pit in near Cheswold, Delaware created during highway construction unearthed 11 specimens of fragmentary and unassociated avian fossils, which were identified by Rasmussen as including a small loon, a small gull-like species and five specimens of a gannet-like seabird, probably Morus loxostylus, a common species in the Miocene. All of these forms were already known from a site in Chesapeake Bay, Maryland. The finds suggests that the Delaware site was the near-shore area of a large bay at the time of deposition.

Rasmussen was also involved in a review of fossil birds from Miocene and Pliocene deposits in North Carolina. Finds included an early Miocene loon Colymboides minutus, various ducks, a crested tern closely resembling the modern royal tern Sterna maxima, and a member of the crow genus, one of the few fossil passerine birds from that period. The review found that fossil birds from this period generally closely resemble a modern species or genus, and those that do not can usually be placed in a modern family with a fair degree of confidence.

=== Birds of South Asia ===
In 1992, Rasmussen took the position of assistant to S. Dillon Ripley, the former secretary of the Smithsonian, who was planning to produce a definitive guide to the birds of South Asia. When he became ill shortly after beginning the project, Rasmussen took over the project, and with artist John C. Anderton, produced Birds of South Asia: The Ripley Guide, a two-volume bird guide for the Indian subcontinent which was the first field guide for the area to include sonograms. Volume 1 contains the field guide with over 3400 illustrations in 180 plates, and more than 1450 colour maps. Volume 2 (Attributes and Status) gives specimen measurements, data about identification, status, distribution and habits. Vocalizations are described from recordings, and there are over 1000 sonograms.

1508 species that have occurred in India, Bangladesh, Pakistan, Nepal, Bhutan, Maldives, the Chagos Archipelago and Afghanistan are covered, including 85 hypothetical and 67 'possible' species, which are given only short accounts. Notable aspects of Birds of South Asia are its distribution evidence-base – the book's authors based their distributional information almost completely on museum specimens – and its taxonomic approach, involving a large number of species-level splits. Its geographical range was also greater than that of older works, notably in the inclusion of Afghanistan.

Many allopatric forms previously regarded as conspecific are treated by Rasmussen and Anderton as full species. Most of these had previously been proposed elsewhere, but the book introduced a number of innovations of its own. Experts on Asian birds, Nigel Collar and John Pilgrim, in 2008 analysed Rasmussen and Anderton's proposed changes, indicating which had previously been proposed by other authors, and which were novel, and required further justification.

Although reviews in the birding and ornithological press have often been favourable, there have been criticisms. Peter Kennerley, author and Asian bird expert, considered that some of the illustrations are small and garish or technically inaccurate. He also believes that the over-reliance on sometimes very old museum specimens and dismissal of the wealth of observational data filed by amateur travelling birders is a mistake, and states that many of the taxonomic decisions appear to be random choices, unsupported by published research.

Apart from the Meinertzhagen fraud, which is discussed in the next section, and the death of S. Dillon Ripley, other problems in the production of Birds of South Asia included the loss of the main map database during a trip to Burma, and poorly prepared specimen skins. There were also difficulties reconciling sources, delays in producing illustrations and maps, and in obtaining reliable data for "difficult" areas like Assam, Arunachal Pradesh, Bangladesh and Afghanistan. The Andaman and Nicobar Islands also presented serious challenges with regard to the status and taxonomy of their avifaunas.

Rasmussen considered in a 2005 paper whether the revised taxonomy of the book, with its many species splits, had significant conservation implications, but felt that the effect on species richness in South Asia was limited, and would have only a moderate conservation impact, increasing the number of potentially threatened species in the region from 6% of the total avifauna to about 7%.

=== Meinertzhagen fraud ===
Hill blue flycatcher (formerly large blue flycatcher), a species with false Meinertzhagen records

Rasmussen revealed the true extent of the major fraud perpetrated by the eminent British officer, ornithologist and expert on bird lice, Colonel Richard Meinertzhagen. Meinertzhagen, who died in 1967, was the author of numerous taxonomic and other works on birds, and possessed a vast collection of bird and bird lice specimens; he was considered one of Britain's greatest ornithologists. However, British ornithologist Alan Knox had analysed Meinertzhagen's bird collection at the Walter Rothschild Zoological Museum in Tring, UK in the early 1990s, and uncovered significant fraud involving theft of specimens from museums and falsification of the accompanying documentation.

When researching for Birds of South Asia, Rasmussen examined tens of thousands of bird specimens, since the late S. Dillon Ripley had strongly favoured the use of museum specimens to determine which birds to include. With Robert Prys-Jones of the Natural History Museum, she showed that the decades-old Meinertzhagen fraud was far more extensive than first thought. Many of the 20,000 bird specimens in his collection had been relabelled with regard to where they were collected, and sometimes also remounted. The false documentation delayed the rediscovery of the forest owlet, since previous searches had relied on Meinertzagen's faked records. Rasmussen's successful expedition ignored these and looked in the areas identified by the remaining genuine specimens.

Meinertzhagen had been banned from the Natural History Museum's Bird Room for 18 months for unauthorised removal of specimens, and suspicions that he was stealing specimens and library material were documented by staff for over 30 years, twice reaching the verge of prosecution.

Falsified records identified by Rasmussen and Prys-Jones included high-altitude occurrences of coral-billed scimitar-babbler Pomatorhinus ferruginosus, out-of-range Kashmir flycatcher Ficedula subrubra and Himalayan winter records of ferruginous flycatcher Muscicapa ferruginea and large blue flycatcher Cyornis magnirostris (then treated as a subspecies of C. banyumas). However, some records such as those for Afghan snowfinch Montifringilla theresae, a species Meinertzhagen described, appear to be genuine.

== Exhibitions ==
MSUM has regular exhibitions; those featuring Rasmussen's projects include "Land of the Feathered Dragons: China and the Origin of Birds" in 2015, “They Passed Like a Cloud: The Passenger Pigeon and Extinction” in 2014, “Echoes of Silent Spring: 50 Years of Environmental Awareness” (for the Silent Spring 50th anniversary in 2012), “Avelution: Birds in the Development of Darwin’s Theories of Evolution,” in 2010 and "Birds of South Asia: History vs. Mystery," in 2003–2004. The last was also shown at the Detroit Zoo Wildlife Interpretive Gallery in 2005–2006.
