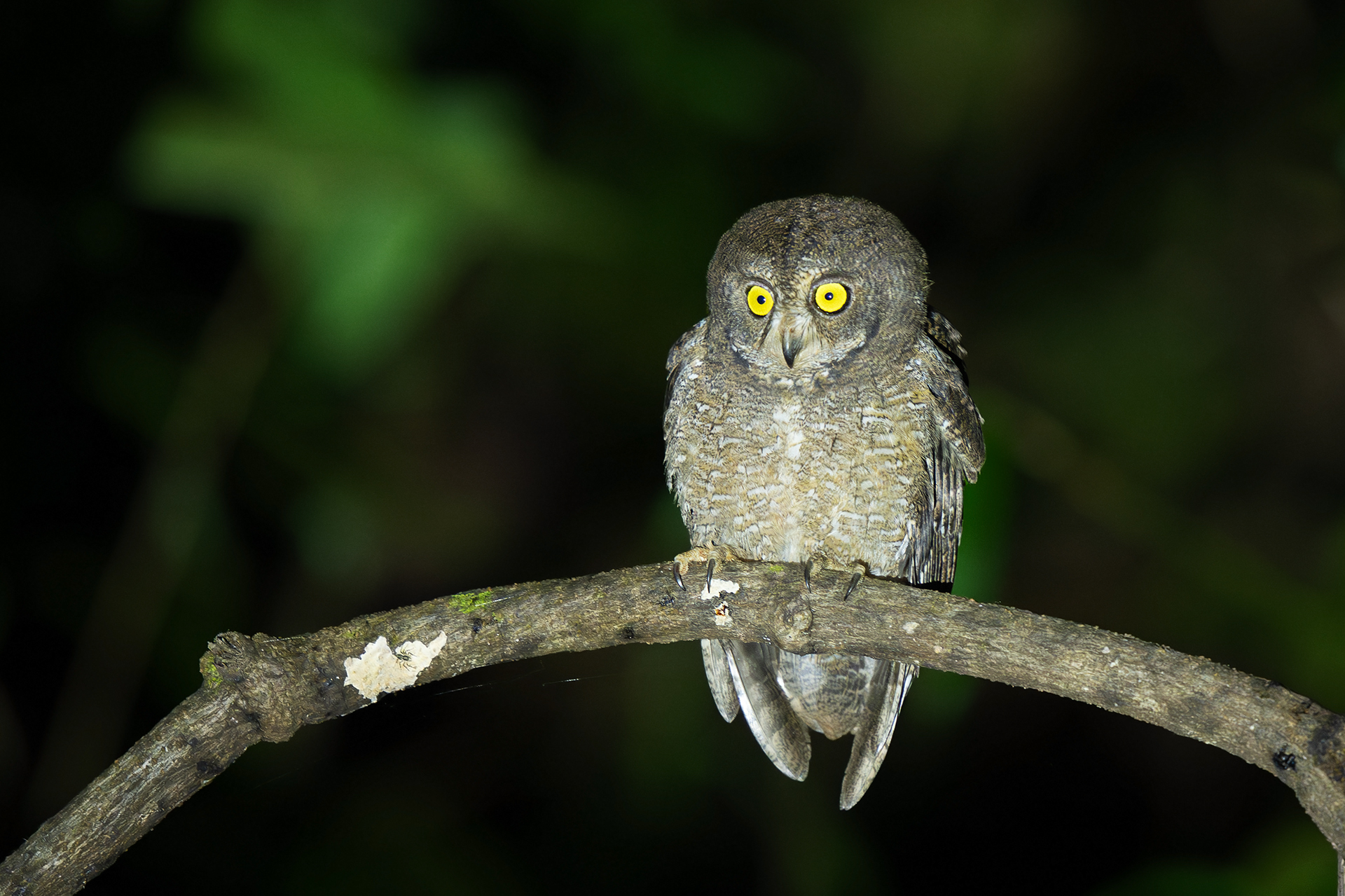

Conservation status
- Near Threatened (IUCN 3.1)
- CITES Appendix II

Scientific classification
- Kingdom: Animalia
- Phylum: Chordata
- Class: Aves
- Order: Strigiformes
- Family: Strigidae
- Genus: Otus
- Species: O. alius

Binomial name
- Otus alius Rasmussen, 1998

= Nicobar scops owl =

Species of owl

The Nicobar scops owl (Otus alius) is a species of bird belonging to the family Strigidae, the typical owls. This owl is endemic to the Nicobar Islands in India.

== Taxonomy ==
The Nicobar scops owl was first formally described in 1998 by the American ornithologist Pamela C. Rasmussen with its type locality given as Campbell Bay on Great Nicobar Island. This species is included in the genus Otus which is the only genus in the tribe Otini in the subfamily Striginae of the typical owl family Strigidae in the order Strigiformes.

== Etymology ==
The Nicobar scops owl is classified in the genus Otus, which is Latinised from the Greek otos, meaning a "small, eared owl". The specific name. alius, is Latin for "other" as this is another scops owl from the Nocobar Islands, it also "encapsulates" the family name of Humayun Abdulali, who collected the first specimens of this owl and who made many contributions to Indian ornithology, particularly that of the Andaman and Nicobar Islands.

== Description ==
The Nicobar scops owl has warm brown upperparts with dense dusky barring and light anddark bars on the lower mantle and back. The crown and nape are similarly coloured and patterned by the bars there are finer. The "eyebrow" are pale, contrasting with the mottled dark plumage of the face, which is paler than the rest of the underparts. It has medium sized, pale ear tufts which are rather rounded at the tips. The throat is cinnamon coloured darkening on the upper breast, the lower breast and belly are barred with very pale cinnamon and dusky brown. There is a row of white spots on the shoulder and the flight feathers are barred with brown. This species measures 22 to 25 cm (8.7 to 9.8 in) in length and weighs 115 to 135 g (4.1 to 4.8 oz). The most frequent calls of this species include a plaintive whistle, which rises in pitch and that may become an accelerating series that does not change pitch. There is also and lengthy series of stuttering barks that sound a little like a frog or a small dog.

== Distribution and habitat ==
The Nicobar scops owl is endemic to the Nicobar Islands which are part of the Indian Union territory of the Andaman and Nicobar Islands. The paratype was found in coastal forest on Great Nicobar Island around 1 km (0.62 mi) from the sea.
