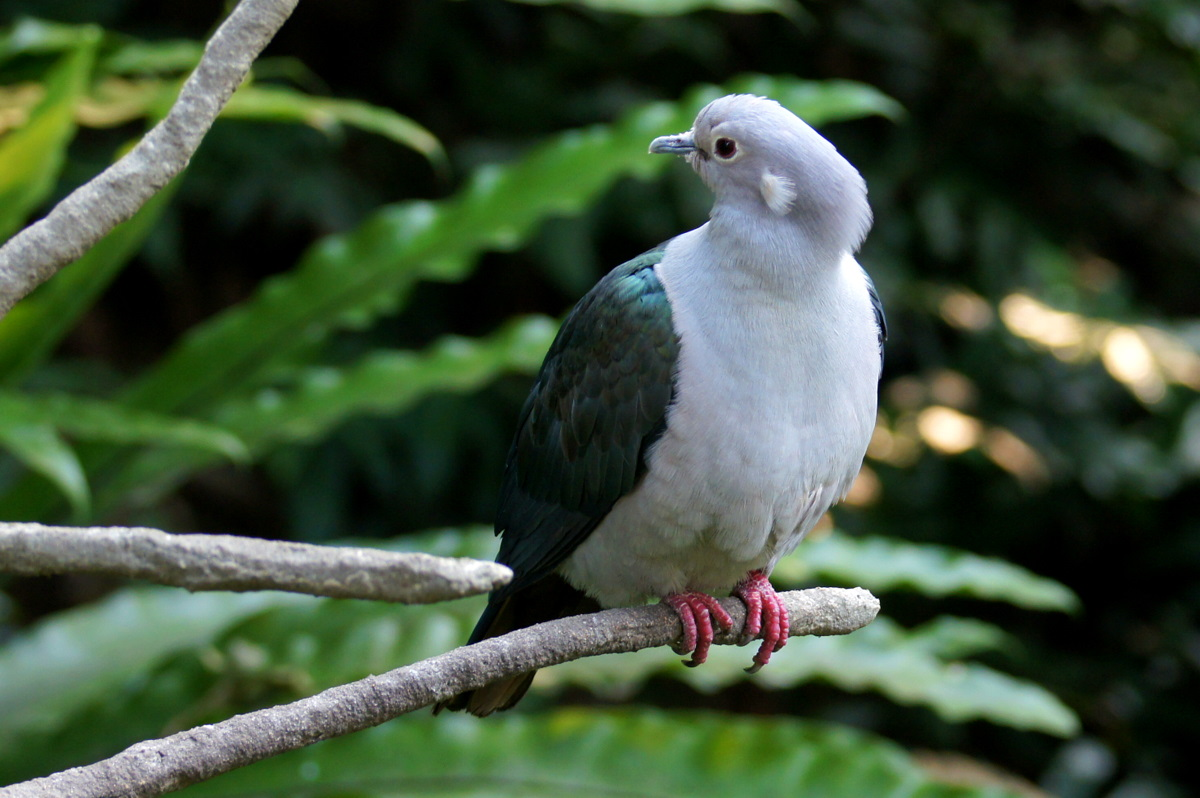

Conservation status
- Near Threatened (IUCN 3.1)

Scientific classification
- Kingdom: Animalia
- Phylum: Chordata
- Class: Aves
- Order: Columbiformes
- Family: Columbidae
- Genus: Ducula
- Species: D. aenea

Binomial name
- Ducula aenea (Linnaeus, 1766)

Synonyms
- Columba aenea (Linnaeus, 1766); Carpophaga aenothorax; Ducula aeneus (Linnaeus, 1766)

= Green imperial pigeon =

Species of bird

The green imperial pigeon (Ducula aenea) is a large forest pigeon. The large range extends from Nepal, southern India and Sri Lanka eastwards to southern China, Indonesia and the Philippines.

== Taxonomy ==
In 1760 the French zoologist Mathurin Jacques Brisson included a description of the green imperial pigeon in his six volume Ornithologie. He used the French name Le pigeon ramier des Moluques and the Latin Palumbus moluccensis. Although Brisson coined Latin names, these do not conform to the binomial system and are not recognised by the International Commission on Zoological Nomenclature. When in 1766 the Swedish naturalist Carl Linnaeus updated his Systema Naturae for the twelfth edition, he added 240 species that had been previously described by Brisson. One of these was the green imperial pigeon which he placed with all the other pigeons in the genus Columba. Linnaeus included a brief description, coined the binomial name Columba aenea and cited Brisson's work. Brisson believed his specimen had come from the Maluku Islands but the species does not occur there and in 1918 the type locality was designated as the island of Flores in Indonesia. The specific name aenea is from the Latin aeneus meaning "of a bronze colour" or "coppery". This species is now placed in the genus Ducula that was introduced by the English naturalist Brian Houghton Hodgson in 1836.

Eleven subspecies are recognised:

- D. a. sylvatica (Tickell, 1833) – Indian green imperial pigeon – north India and Nepal to south China to Thailand, and Indochina
- D. a. pusilla (Blyth, 1849) – south India, Sri Lanka
- D. a. andamanica Abdulali, 1964 – Andaman Islands
- D. a. consobrina (Salvadori, 1887) – islands of West Sumatra except Enggano Island
- D. a. polia (Oberholser, 1917) – Sunda green imperial pigeon – Malay Peninsula to Greater and Lesser Sunda Islands
- D. a. palawanensis (Blasius, W, 1888) Banggi Island (north Borneo) to Palawan and nearby islands (southwest Philippines)
- D. a. fugaensis (Hachisuka, 1930) – north Philippines (Calayan, Camiguin and Fuga Island)
- D. a. nuchalis (Cabanis, 1882) – Maroon-naped imperial pigeon – north Luzon (north Philippines)
- D. a. aenea (Linnaeus, 1766) – Nominate subspecies – Philippines (other than northern Luzon and Palawan)
- D. a. intermedia (Meyer, AB & Wiglesworth, 1894) – Talaud imperial pigeon – Talaud Islands and Sangihe Islands
- D. a. paulina (Bonaparte, 1854) – Chestnut-naped imperial pigeon – Sulawesi, Togian, Banggai and Sula Islands

The subspecies D. a. oenothorax is sometimes treated as a distinct species, the Enggano imperial pigeon (Ducula oenothorax). The Nicobar imperial pigeon (Ducula nicobarica) was formerly treated as conspecific.

== Description ==
The green imperial pigeon is a large, plump pigeon, 45 centimetres (18 in) in length. Its back, wings and tail are metallic green. The head and underparts are white, apart from maroon undertail coverts. Sexes are similar. The bird's call is deep and resonant, and is often the first indication of the presence of this treetop species.

== Distribution and habitat ==
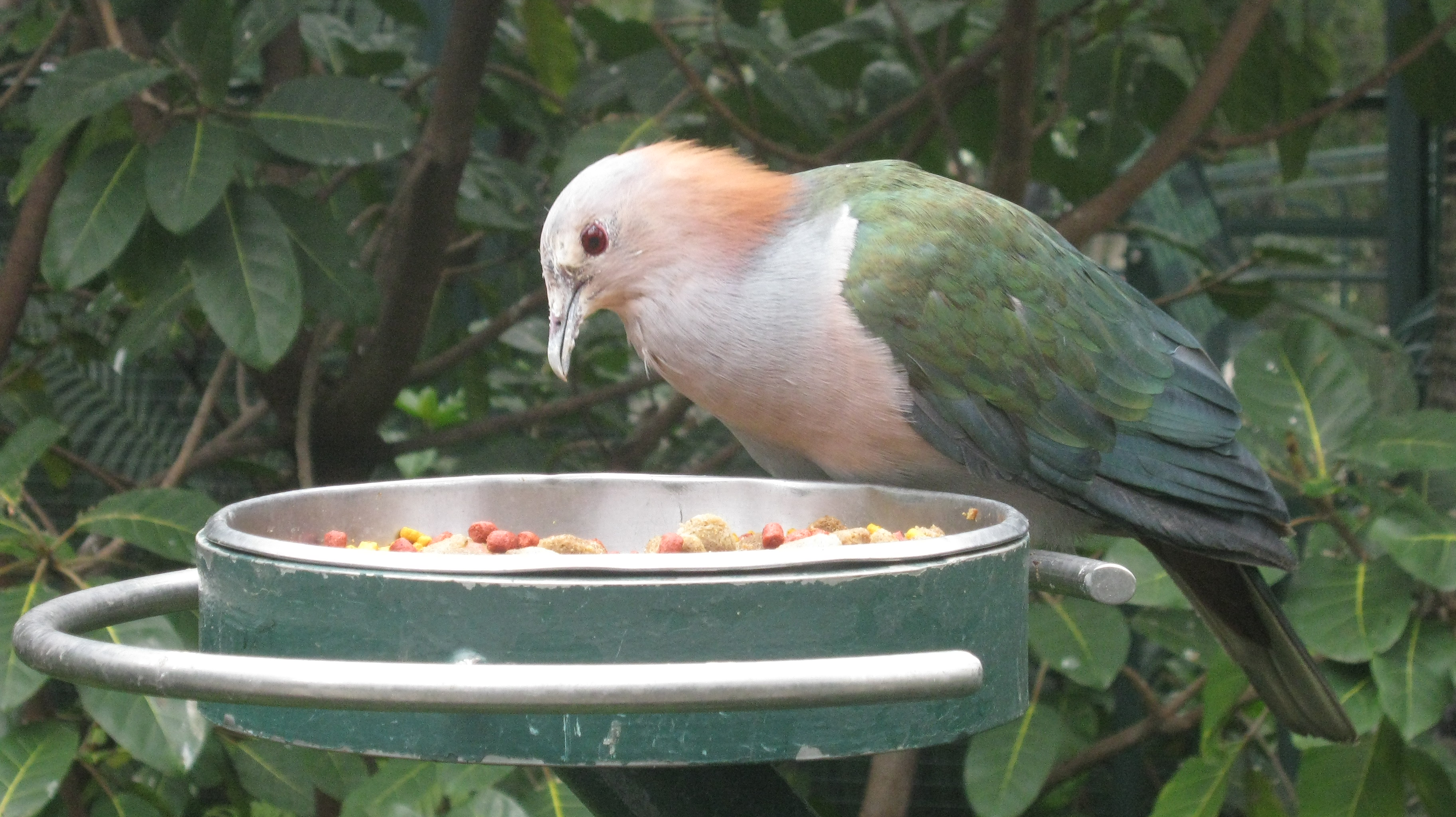
Feeding at the San Diego Zoo, USA

This is a forest species which is a widespread resident breeding bird in tropical southern Asia from Nepal and India east to Indonesia. It has several subspecies, including the distinctive Celebes form, chestnut-naped imperial pigeon (Ducula aenea paulina).

== Behaviour and ecology ==
This is an arboreal dove, feeding on plant material in the tree canopy. Its flight is fast and direct, with the regular beats and an occasional sharp flick of the wings which are characteristic of pigeons in general. It builds a stick nest in a tree and lays a single white egg. The birds are not very gregarious, but will form small flocks.

== Gallery ==
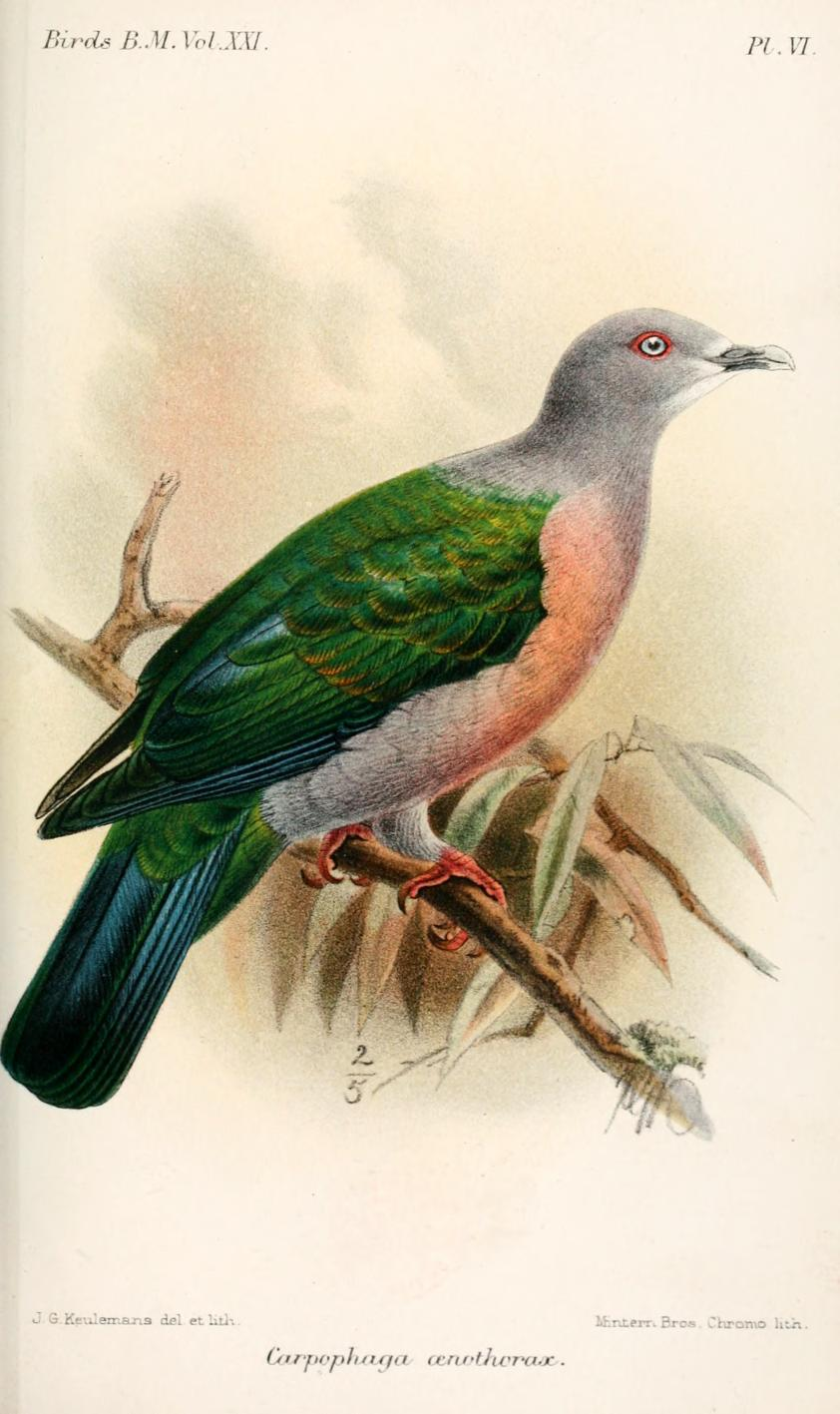
Illustration by Keulemans, 1893

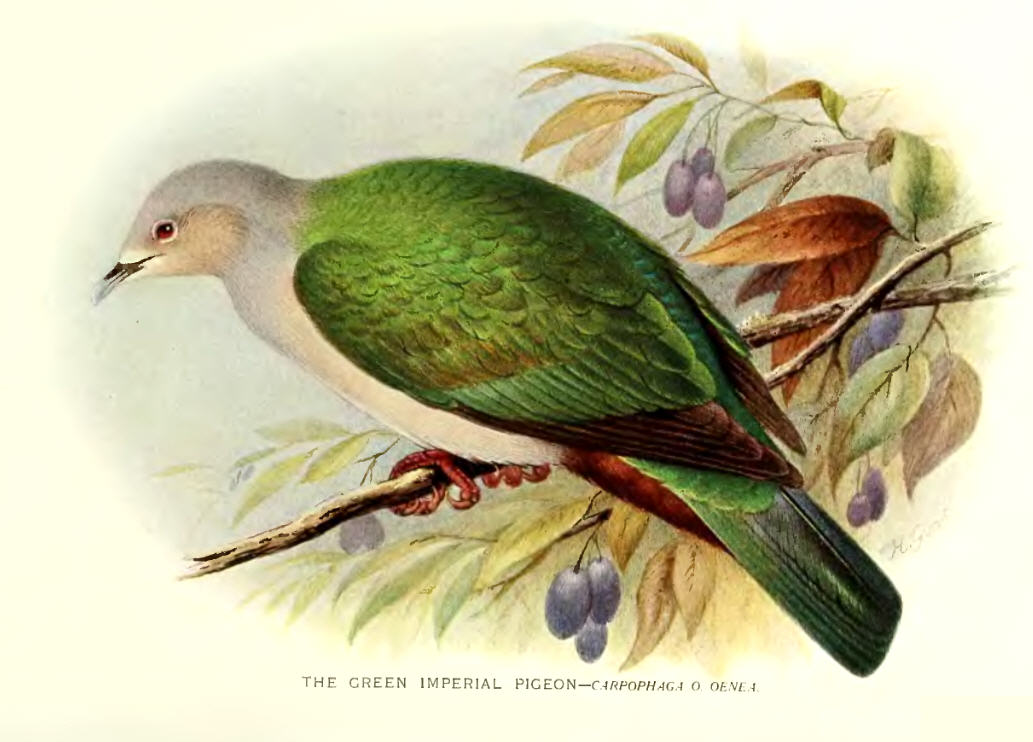
Illustration by Henrik Grønvold & E.C. Stuart Baker, 1913

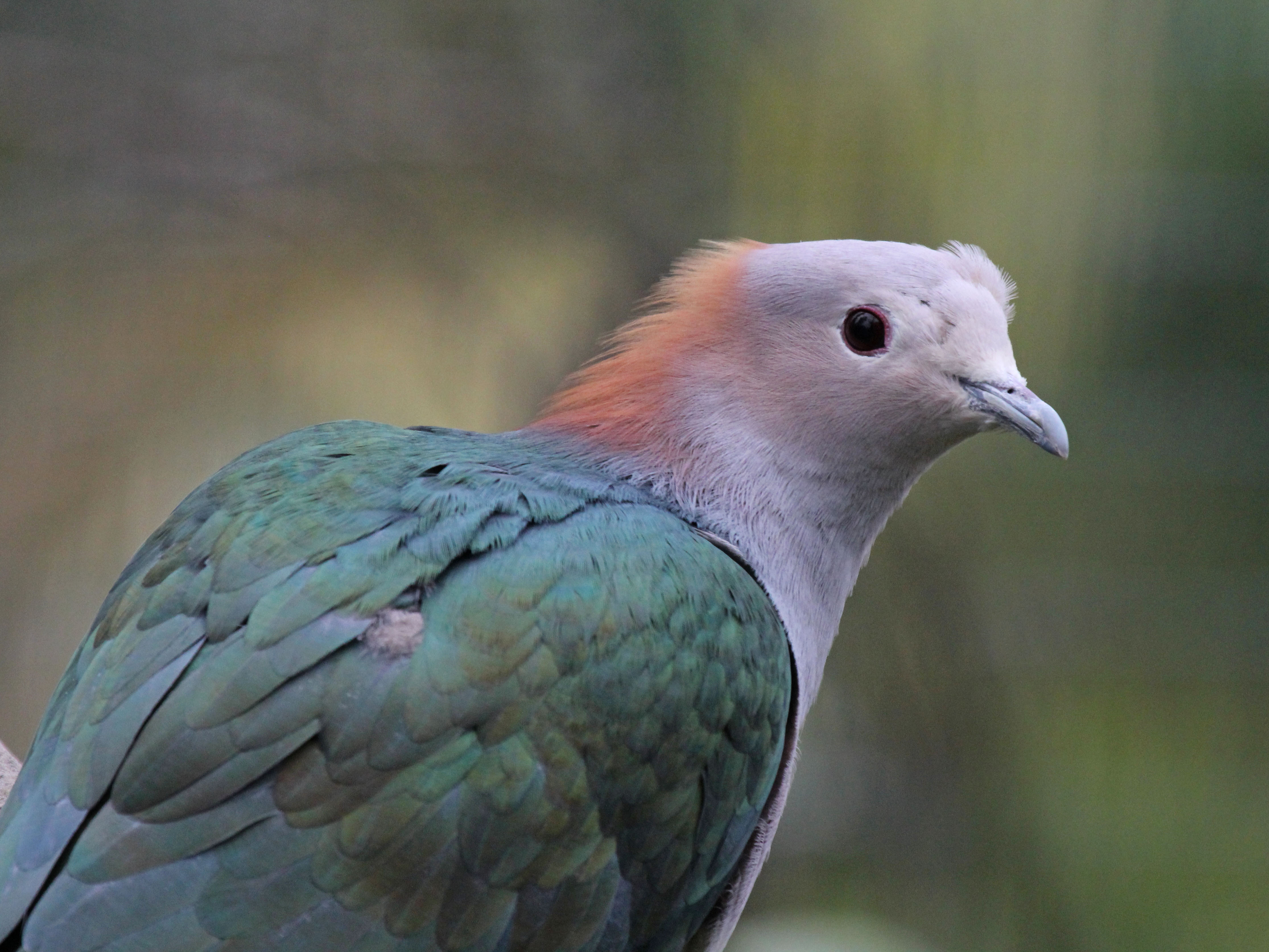
At San Diego Zoo

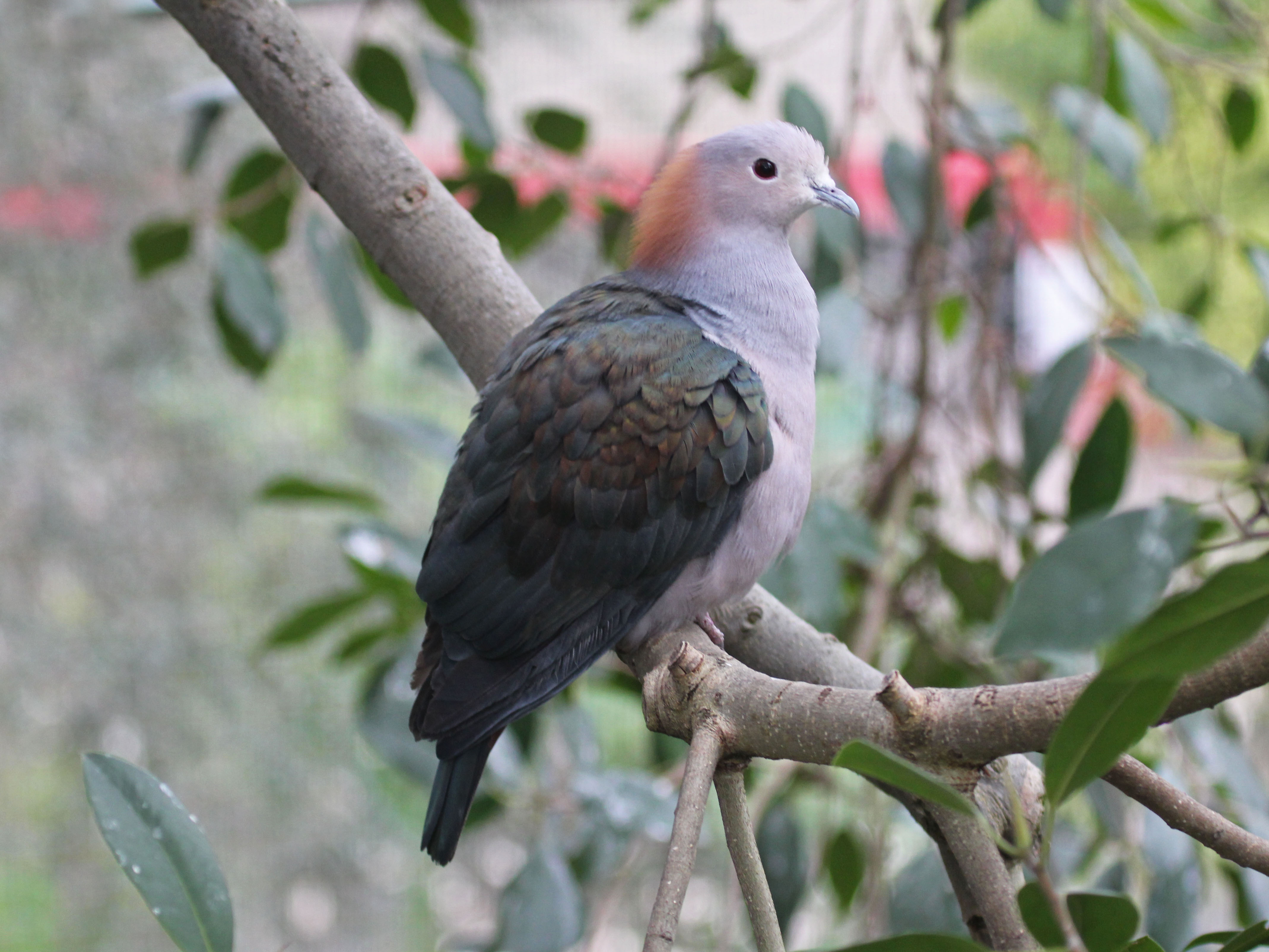
At San Diego Zoo
