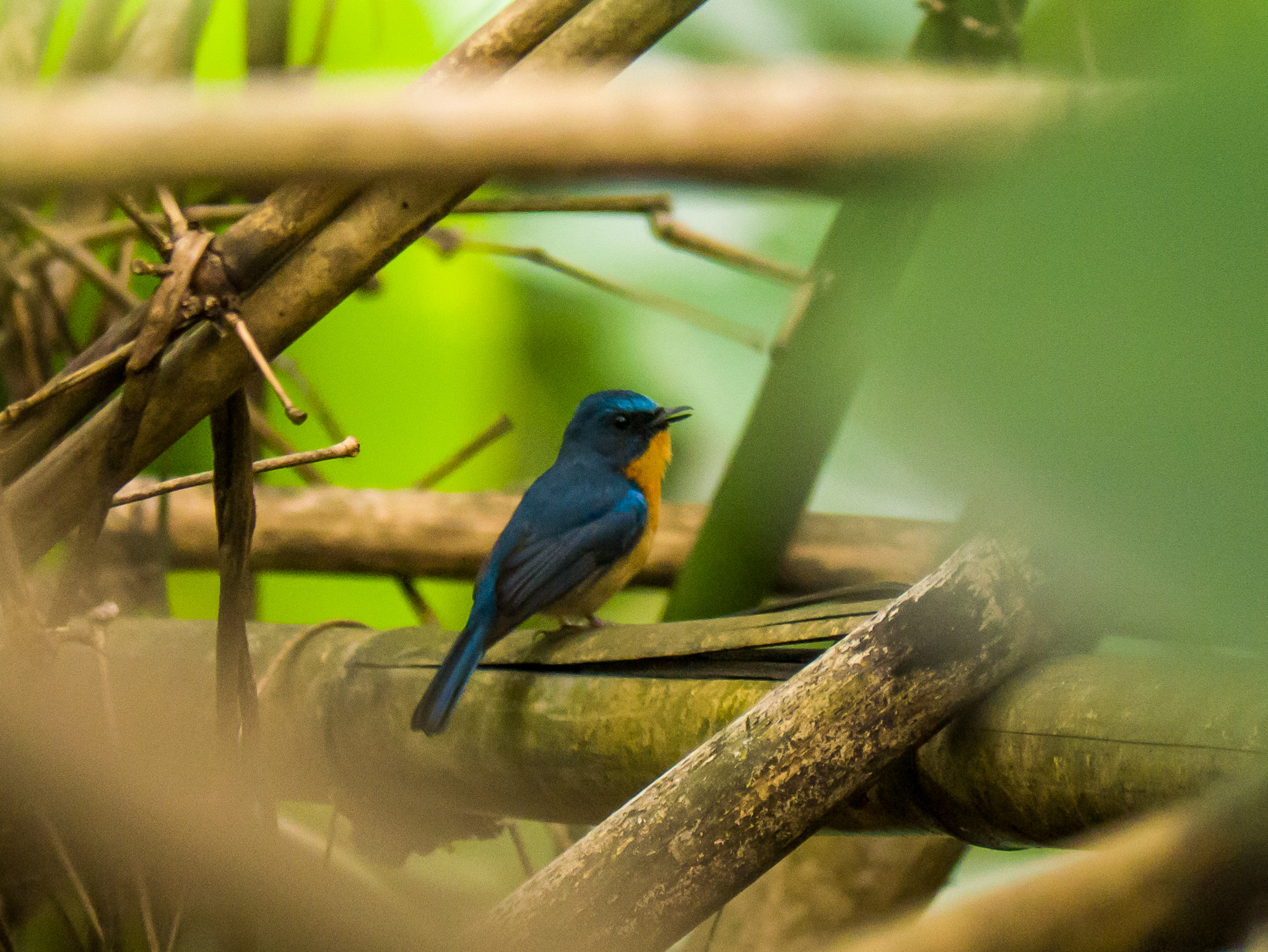

Conservation status
- Near Threatened (IUCN 3.1)

Scientific classification
- Kingdom: Animalia
- Phylum: Chordata
- Class: Aves
- Order: Passeriformes
- Family: Muscicapidae
- Genus: Cyornis
- Species: C. magnirostris

Binomial name
- Cyornis magnirostris Blyth, 1849

Synonyms
- Cyornis banyumas magnirostris

= Large blue flycatcher =

Species of bird

The large blue flycatcher (Cyornis magnirostris) is a medium-sized bird species characterized by distinctive sexual dimorphism along with most others of the Flycatcher family. This species of bird is in the family Muscicapidae. It is found in the eastern Himalayas, from Nepal to Bangladesh. It winters in the northern Malay Peninsula.

== Field identification ==
Adult male large blue flycatchers' exhibit striking features, including a cold, pale blue forehead. Their lores, cheeks, and some of the ear-coverts are jet black, contrasting with a deep blue cap on their head and dark blue feathers on the wings and tail with a subtle purplish tinge. Males display a vibrant orange-rufous throat and chin, which extends to the rear flanks and mid-belly, with the lower underparts being whitish. The bill is black, and the legs vary in color from pale flesh-pink to pale pinkish gray or light horn-brown. In stark contrast, the females are characterized by their grayish upperparts and crown, and strongly rufous-tinged rump, tail, and edges of the wing feathers. Their facial features include a pale buffish eyeing and lores, with dark brown cheeks and a pale rufous-tinged buff chin and throat. The remainder of the underparts are largely similar to the male, appearing whitish. Juvenile large blue flycatchers resemble females but are distinguished by their darker brown plumage, rufescent spots on the upperparts, and deep buff throat and breast with dark bars and scaling, while their belly appears whitish with faint dusky mottling. This species, known for its remarkable sexual dimorphism and vivid coloration, is still a rare sighting, and it continues to slowly decline in population

== Distribution & habitat ==
The large blue flycatcher is not a threatened species globally. This species is found in north eastern India although it is rare. During breeding season it becomes more common to find this species in northern Myanmar.

== Diet & foraging ==
The diet of the large blue flycatcher includes small insects like spiders, worms, and beetles. Foraging is done in pairs but alone when it is not breeding season. Hunting takes places in low, shaded areas of the forest, where the species will sit and wait for these invertebrates to pass by.

== Movement ==
This species is found in north eastern India throughout most of the year although during breeding season it is much more common to find these birds have migrated to northern Myanmar.

== Songs & vocal Behavior ==
The large blue flycatcher has a vocal sound consisting of receptive, high pitched, whistling. They are short, crisp, and sound similar to a vocal tap.

== Conservation status ==
The large blue flycatcher is not a threatened species globally. This species, known for its remarkable sexual dimorphism and vivid coloration, is still a rare sighting, although it is considered to be of the least concern category.
