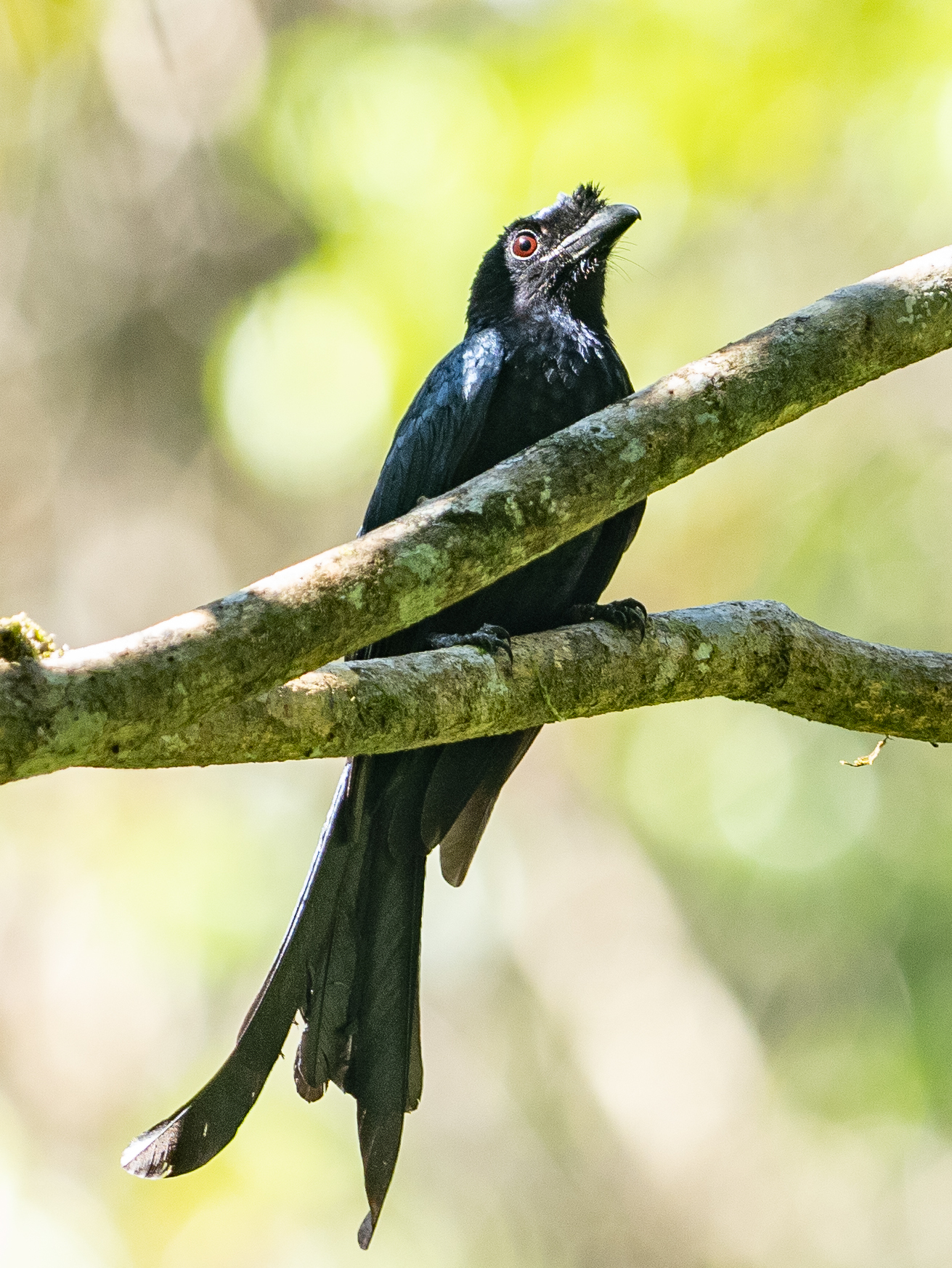

Conservation status
- Least Concern (IUCN 3.1)

Scientific classification
- Kingdom: Animalia
- Phylum: Chordata
- Class: Aves
- Order: Passeriformes
- Family: Dicruridae
- Genus: Dicrurus
- Species: D. lophorinus

Binomial name
- Dicrurus lophorinus Vieillot, 1817

= Sri Lanka drongo =

Species of bird

The Sri Lanka drongo (Dicrurus lophorinus) or Ceylon crested drongo, is a species of bird in the family Dicruridae. It is endemic to Sri Lanka. It was previously considered a subspecies of the greater racket-tailed drongo. Its natural habitats are subtropical or tropical moist lowland and montane forests.

== Taxonomy ==
Dicrurus lophorinus Vieillot, 1817, has in the past been placed in monospecific Dissemurulus, or in Dissemuroides. May form a super species with D. paradiseus, often treated as conspecific, but differs in tail morphology and probably in voice. Molecular-genetic studies required in order to elucidate taxonomic status. Few inter grades with race ceylonicus of D. paradises formerly reported along border between wet and dry zones, but interbreeding not now possible, since suitable habitat no longer remains between the two ecological zones, now completely separated.

== Distribution ==
The species can be found throughout Wet zone of South Western parts of Sri Lanka, from Deduru Oya to Walawe.

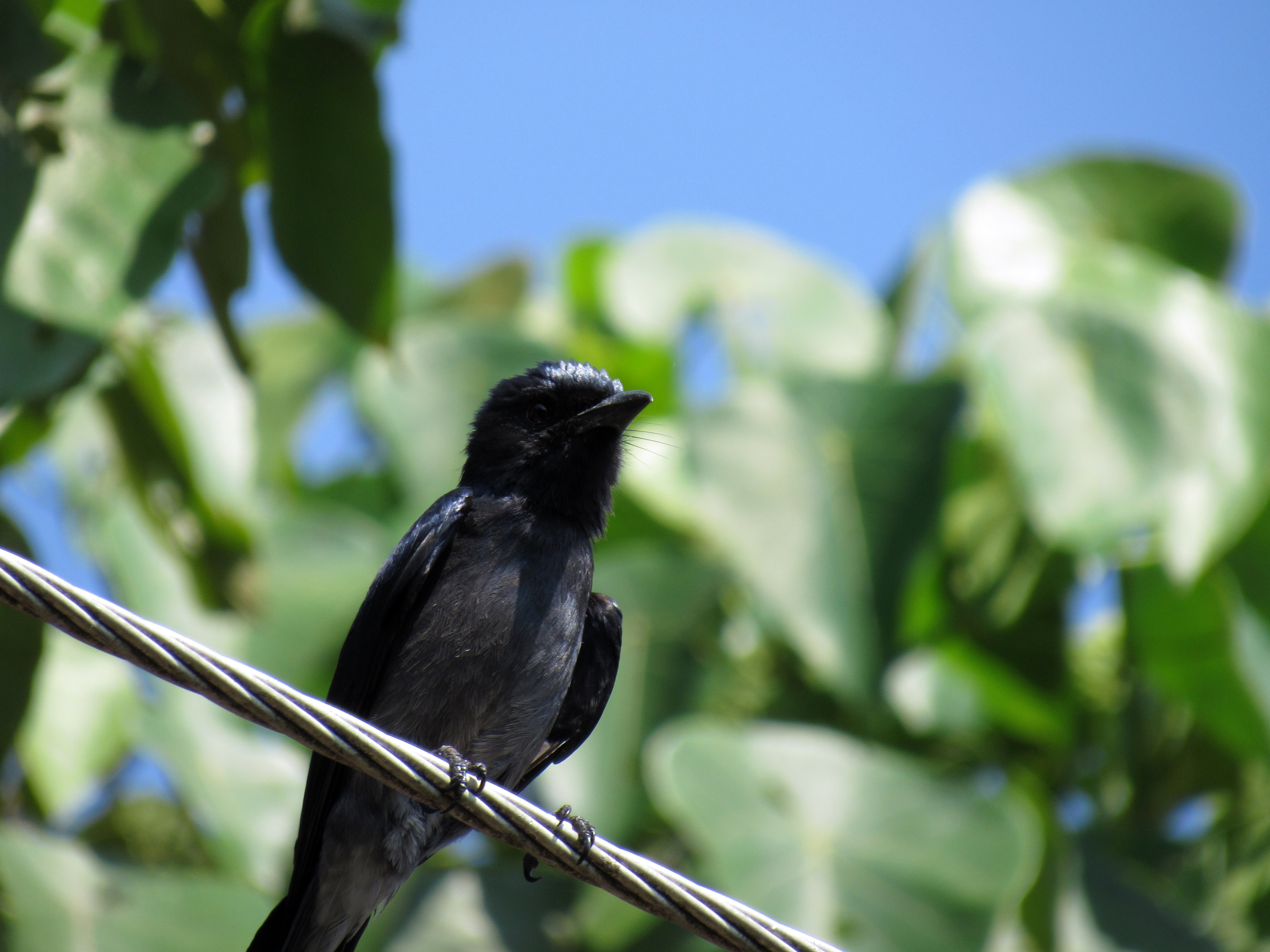

== Identification ==
The Sri Lanka drongo has black plumage with a metallic blue or greenish-blue sheen. It has an arching, helmet-like crest, red eyes, and a deeply-forked tail. Both sexes are indistinguishable from each other.

== Behavior ==
It is a forest bird as other drongos that can is confined to forest edges, plantations, and wooded gardens. Like most drongos, it feeds on insects from open perches. A superb mimic of the calls of other birds but always has a metallic sound.
