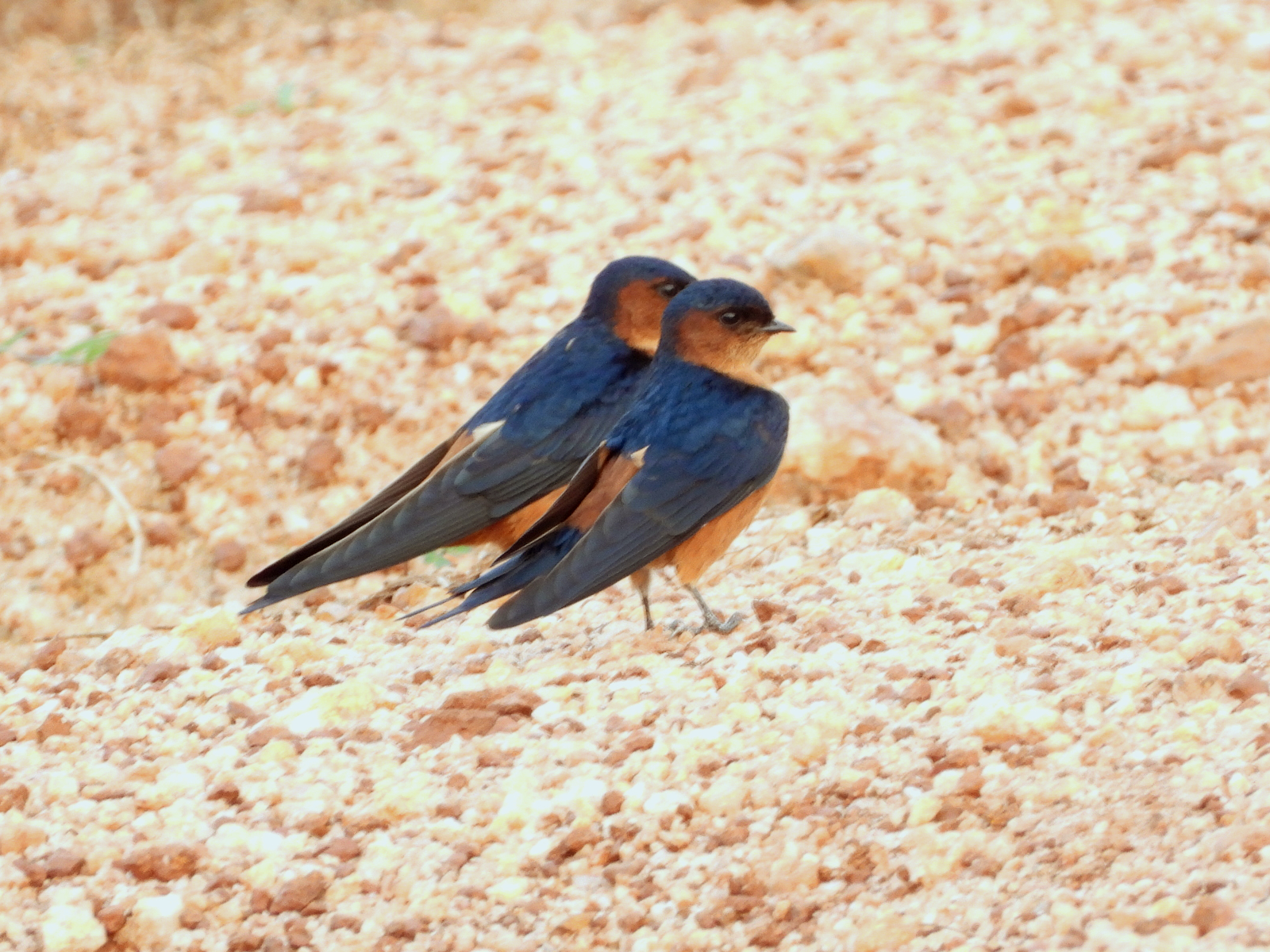
- Two adults in Polonnaruwa, Sri Lanka

Conservation status
- Least Concern (IUCN 3.1)

Scientific classification
- Kingdom: Animalia
- Phylum: Chordata
- Class: Aves
- Order: Passeriformes
- Family: Hirundinidae
- Genus: Cecropis
- Species: C. hyperythra

Binomial name
- Cecropis hyperythra (Blyth, 1849)

Synonyms
- Cecropis daurica hyperythra Hirundo daurica hyperythra

= Sri Lanka swallow =

Species of bird

The Sri Lanka swallow (Cecropis hyperythra) is a resident breeder endemic to Sri Lanka. It is closely related to the red-rumped swallow, and was formerly considered a subspecies.

== Description ==
Quite a large swallow with a deeply forked tail. It has a deep rufous underside and an unmarked navy-blue rump, a unique feature of this species. Its rufous underside can be used to tell it apart from the red-rumped swallow. It is a passerine, which means it has three toes pointing forward and one pointing backward, allowing it to perch.

== Habitat ==
It is found in a variety of open country habitats in both the lowlands and foothills in Sri Lanka, including farm fields and lightly wooded areas.

== Behaviour ==
It usually lives in pairs or small groups.
