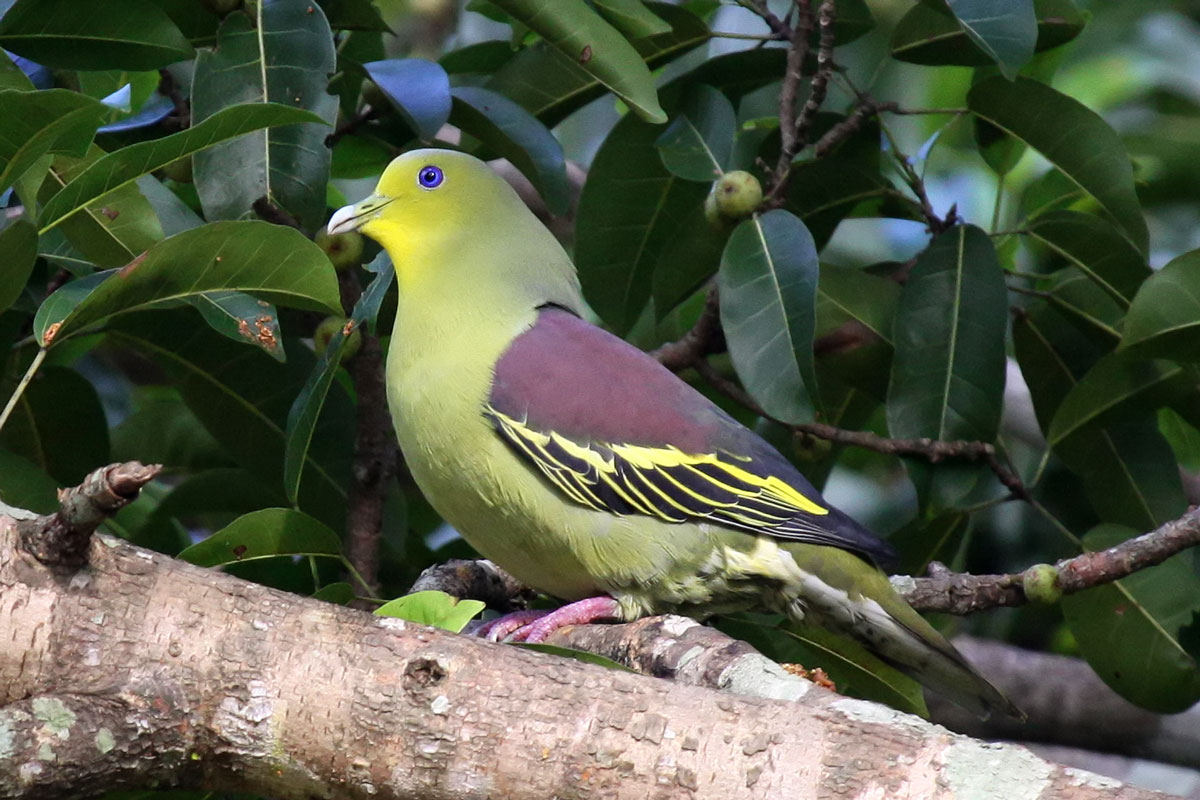
- Male, Kaudulla National Park, Sri Lanka

Conservation status
- Least Concern (IUCN 3.1)

Scientific classification
- Kingdom: Animalia
- Phylum: Chordata
- Class: Aves
- Order: Columbiformes
- Family: Columbidae
- Genus: Treron
- Species: T. pompadora

Binomial name
- Treron pompadora (Gmelin, JF, 1789)
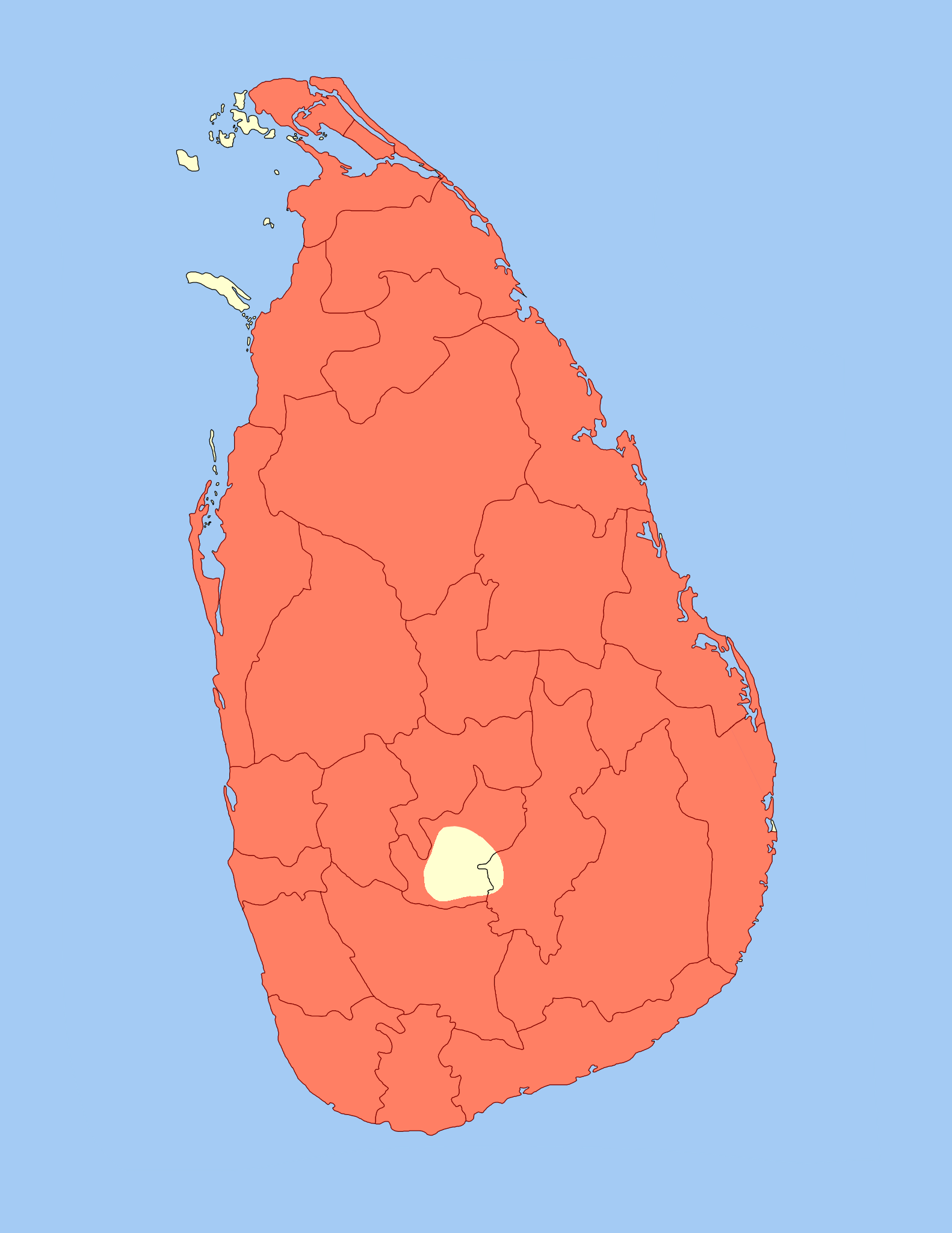

= Sri Lanka green pigeon =

Species of bird

The Pompadour green pigeon, Sri Lanka green pigeon or Ceylon green pigeon (Treron pompadora) is a pigeon in the genus Treron. In Sri Lanka, this bird and several other green pigeon are known as bata goya in the Sinhala language. It is found in the forests of Sri Lanka. Many authorities split the species from the pompadour green pigeon complex.

== Taxonomy ==
The Sri Lanka green pigeon was formally described in 1789 by the German naturalist Johann Friedrich Gmelin in his revised and expanded edition of Carl Linnaeus's Systema Naturae. He placed it with all the other doves and pigeons in the genus Columba and coined the binomial name Columba pompadora. Gmelin based his description on the "Pompadour pigeon" that had been described and illustrated in 1776 by the English naturalist Peter Brown. The Sri Lanka green pigeon is now placed with around 30 other green pigeons in the genus Treron that was introduced in 1816 by the French ornithologist Louis Pierre Vieillot. The genus name is from the Ancient Greek trērōn meaning "pigeon" or "dove". The specific epithet is from Madame de Pompadour, a mistress of Louis XV of France. The species is monotypic: no subspecies are recognised.

== Behaviour ==
The Sri Lanka green pigeon usually occurs singly or in small groups. Its flight is fast and direct, with the regular beats and an occasional sharp flick of the wings that are characteristic of pigeons in general. It eats the seeds and fruits of a wide variety of plants. It builds a stick nest in a tree and lays two white eggs.
