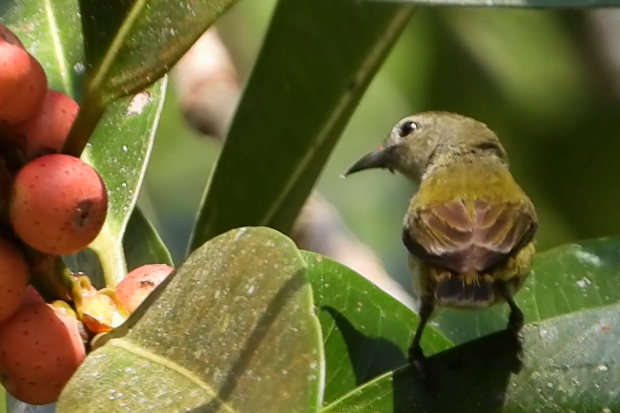

Scientific classification
- Kingdom: Animalia
- Phylum: Chordata
- Class: Aves
- Order: Passeriformes
- Family: Dicaeidae
- Genus: Dicaeum
- Species: D. virescens

Binomial name
- Dicaeum virescens Hume, 1873

= Andaman flowerpecker =

Species of bird

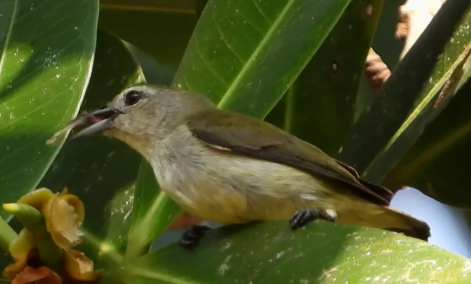

The Andaman flowerpecker (Dicaeum virescens) is a species of bird in the family Dicaeidae. It is endemic to the Andaman Islands.

== Behaviour and ecology ==
Its natural habitat is subtropical or tropical moist lowland forest.
