= Shree Govindajee Temple =

Hindu temple in Imphal, India

Shree Govindajee Temple (Meitei: Shri Shri Govindaji Laisang)
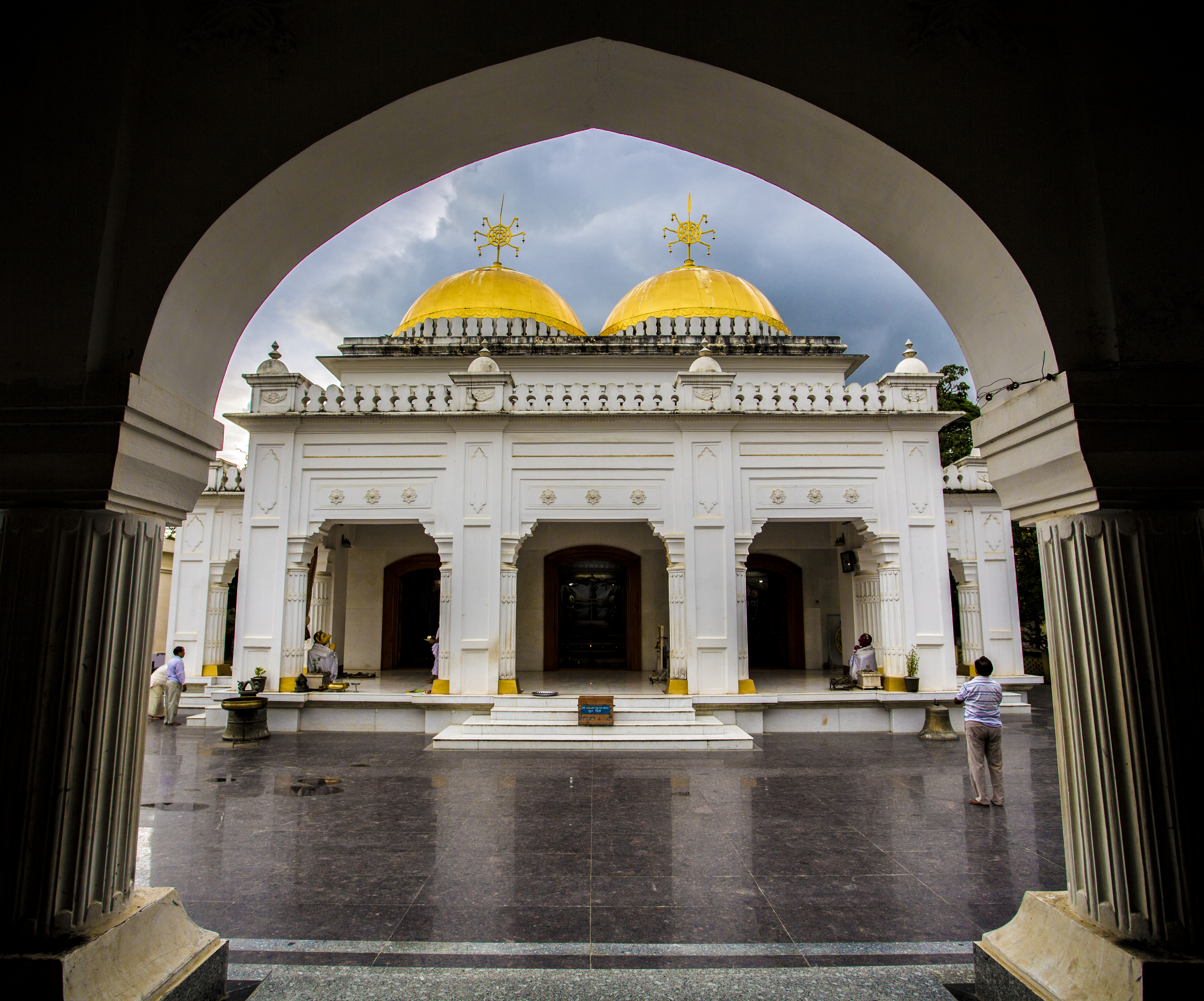

Religion
- Affiliation: Hinduism
- District: Imphal East district
- Deity: Radha Govindaji (Radha Krishna)
- Festivals: Janmashtami and Rathayatra

Location
- Location: Imphal
- State: Manipur
- Country: India
- Interactive map of Shree Govindajee Temple (Meitei: Shri Shri Govindaji Laisang)
- Coordinates: 24.797798°N 93.948486°E

Architecture
- Creator: Maharaja Nara Singh and Maharaja Chandrakirti Singh
- Completed: Original in 1846, rebuilt in 1876

Specifications
- Temple: 1
- Monument: 3

Shree Govindajee Temple (Meitei: ꯁ꯭ꯔꯤ ꯁ꯭ꯔꯤ ꯒꯣꯚꯤꯟꯗꯖꯤ ꯂꯥꯢꯁꯪ, romanized: Shri Shri Govindajee Laishang) is a Meitei Hindu temple, dedicated to Hindu deities Radha Krishna (Govindaji). It is the largest Vaishnava temple in Imphal district of Manipur, India. It was originally built in 1846 during the reign of Maharaja Nara Singh and later rebuilt by Maharaja Chandrakriti in 1876.

== Location ==
Shree Govindajee Temple is located in Imphal, the capital of the Indian state of Manipur, next to Sana Konung (Meitei for 'Royal Palace'), the palace of the former Meitei rulers of the Manipur Kingdom. Imphal is accessible by road and air services. National Highway 39 (India) connects with Dimapur (Nagaland) on the North and with Myanmar on the east. It is connected to Silchar in Assam by National Highway 53 (India). National Highway 150 (India) connects with Mizoram. The nearest rail link is at Dimapur, 215 kilometres (134 mi) away, from where regular bus services operate to Imphal. Air services operate to Imphal from New Delhi, Kolkata, Guwahati and Silchar.

== History ==
Maharaja Nara Singh (1844–50 AD) of the Manipur kingdom commissioned the temple on 16 January 1846 and dedicated it to Shree Govindaji, which was their royal deity. The temple and the deities were substantially damaged during an earthquake of 1868. Consequently, the temple was rebuilt to its original design during the reign of Maharaja Chandrakriti (1859-1886) and was consecrated on 26 April 1876. However, during the Anglo Manipur war of 1891 the idols of the temple were moved to Kongma. In 1908, after the Maharaja Churchand Singh took up residence at his new palace the idols were also moved and reconsecrated in the present temple.

It is also said that (Maharaja Jai Singh) or Bhagya Chandra Karta (1763–1798), who was an ardent devotee of Lord Krishna, received an epiphany from the Lord to build a temple for him. Accordingly, he formally initiated the carving of the idol of the Lord Govindaji, in 1776, which was then completed and consecrated in November 1779 on the full moon day in a temple built by him in his palace. On this occasion Ras Lila was performed for five days at Raas Mandal Pukhri at Langthabal.

== Structure ==
The temple is simple in design with two gold plated domes, a paved court and a large, raised Mandop (Meitei for 'Mandapa')), or congregation hall. The central chamber of the garbhagriha (sanctum sanctorum) has Govindaji (Krishna) and his chief consort Radha as the main deities. The other two chambers on the either side of the central altar is dedicated to Krishna and Balarama on one side and Jagannath, Subhadra and Balabhadra on the other side. The temple appears very elegant. It is built in an idyllic location with a well tended garden surrounding the premises. There is a small pond in the vicinity of the temple, and also a large open space where a row of tall trees are planted along the boundary.

=== Main temple ===
The temple is built over a square plan on a high platform like a royal residence. The sanctum sanctorum is surrounded by a circumambulatory passage (Pradakshina path). The sanctum is compartmentalized with two short walls. The outer chamber and the porch are built with huge columns in an arcade system where the walls above the arches rise up to the cornice. The first row of railings is provided above the cornice, in front of the portico roof, over the Pradakshina path. At the four corners of the railings small shrines called "Salas" are built. Above the sanctum, the walls rise to the terrace and are then formed into two arched domes. The arched formation of the dome terminates in to a crown where an Amalaka Sila (a circular stone disc with ridges on the rim) is topped by a Kalasa (finial) on each of the domes. A white flag is hoisted above the Kalasa. The external surface of the two domes is gilded with gold. A second row of railing, at a higher level, is provided around the two domes. The temple entrance faces east. The temple is built with brick and mortar. In the sanctum sanctorum images of Govindaji with Radha are deified in the central chamber. In its adjoining northern chamber images of Jagannath, Subhadra and Balabhadra are installed while on the southern chamber images of Balabhadra and Krishna are deified. The arcade in front of the sanctum is covered with a curtain. The images of Govindaji and Radha are first carved out of special wood and with the remaining wood images of Jagannath, Subhadra and Balabhadra are made. Images of Krishna and Balarama are, however, made of Plaster of Paris in attractive colorful shades. On special festival days the images are adorned with crowns.

=== Mandapa ===
Facing the facade of the temple to the east is an open colonnaded mandapa, an outdoor pavilion with arcades. It is an independent structure, but within the enclosed precincts of the temple. It is built with royal elegance and is built double storied. It is covered by a protective railing at the first floor level. At the cornice level on the first floor a row of elephant heads are provided which support the inclined roof slabs. A mini temple tower is built as an extension of the mandapa. Seating arrangements are built within the mandapa on its eastern and southern sides to accommodate to devotees who come to witness the cultural and religious programmes held in the mandapa. The roof covering is made of corrugated cement sheets. There is also another mandapa known as the Natyashala, which is also a colonnaded structure with arcades with idols fixed at the four corners of the roof.

== Worship ==
The daily worship practice followed in the temple, in the morning and evening hours, is very ritualistic and highly disciplined with strict dress code observed by the devotees. The temple doors are opened with the ringing of the large temple bell fixed in a separate bell tower next to the temple, which resounds over a large area. With blowing of ritual conches the main curtained door in front of the sanctum is opened revealing the main images enshrined in the sanctum. Devotees line up on either side of the main shrine, with women queuing up one side and men on the other side. Men who come to offer worship here are to wear only a white shirt or a kurta in a light shade and a dhoti, while women are dressed in traditional Pungou phanek and Innafi, salwar kameez or sari. Women carry offerings to the deity in a brass plate with or without a bell. Live music by permanently stationed musicians is a regular feature in the temple during the main prayer hours. The Meitheis, an ethnic group of Manipur, are the ardent devotees of the Lord of this temple.

== Temple administration ==
The temple management was earlier with the former king, as per Article II of the Manipur Merger Agreement of 1949 (when Manipur became a part of India after the latter's independence). However, by popular demand, it is now managed by a board with members drawn from the priestly community and important people of the city. The chief minister of the state of Manipur is the board's president.

== Festivals ==
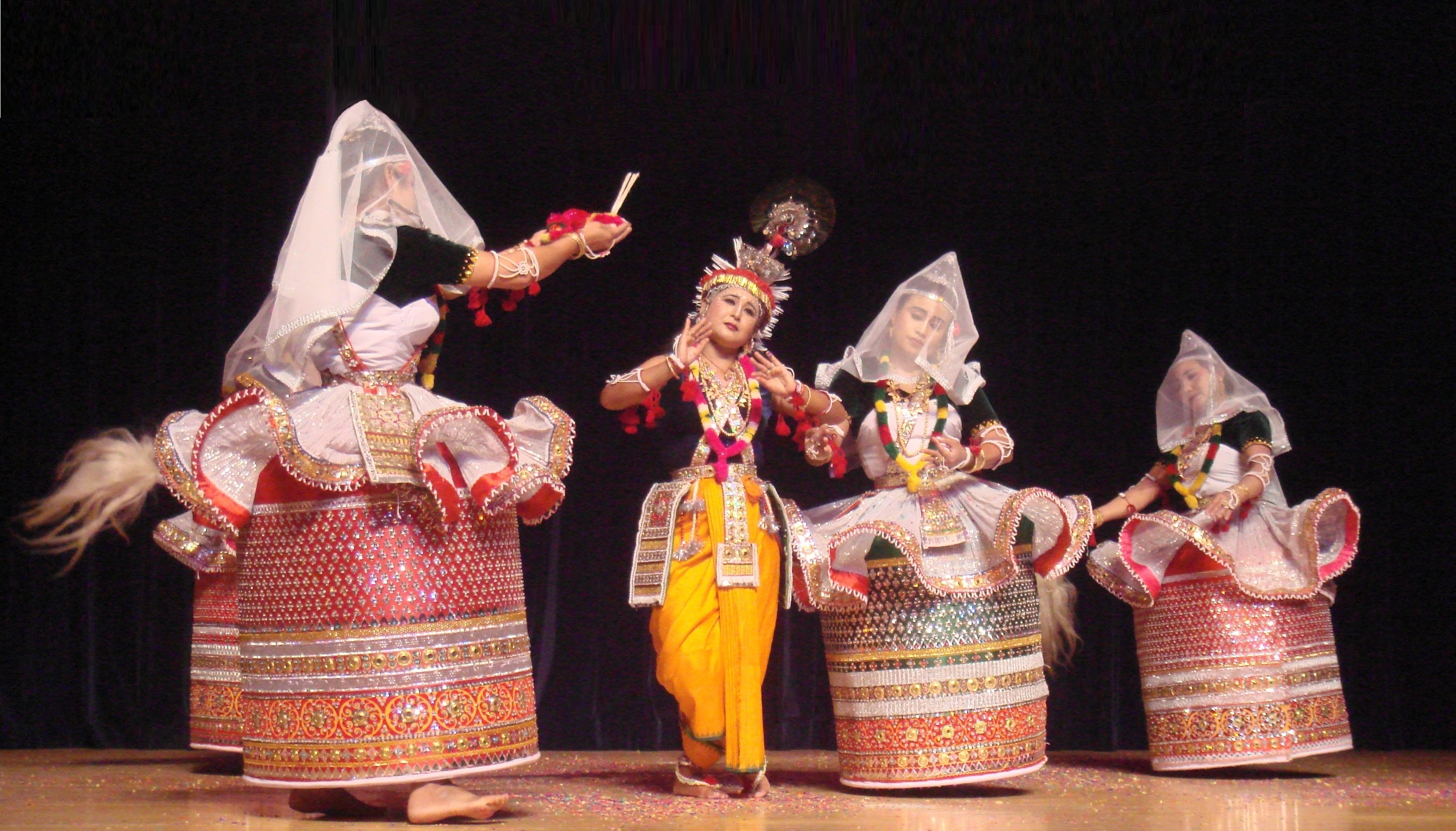
Ras Lila dance in Manipur

Important festivals held with much fanfare are the Janmashatami, during the month of August, and Kang (Rathayatra), during June–July, which are attended by a very large number of devotees. Another important activity held in the precincts of the temple is the Ras Lila, a dance form of Manipur, held with great enthusiasm during Halangkar (Holi festival), Basant Purnima in February, and Kartik Purnima in October. Ras Lila is a dance form which was started by Maharaja Jai Singh. In this dance form the typical skirt that the dancers wear was revealed to Jai Singh in a dream, when the Lord appeared before him wearing a similar dress, directing him to build a temple for Him. The Ras Lila is a grand visual treat when a large number of gopis in traditional attire dance around the temple's main deity, which is brought out for the occasion onto the grounds at the sacred Kaina. Kaina, which is 29 km from Imphal, is the location where Maharaja Jai Singh was directed by Lord Govindaji to carve out his image from a jackfruit tree and enshrine it in a temple.

== Renovations ==
The temple and the mantapa are under renovation since November 2012. The gold plating of the domes which was removed for renovation has been redone during August 2013. The plating is said to weigh 30 kilograms (66 lb) of gold. The mantapa is also undergoing renovation. The flooring in the temple was proposed to be changed to tiles. The total cost of the renovations was estimated at Rs 8 crore.

== See also ==
- Iputhou Pakhangba Laishang
- Sanamahi Temple
- Hiyangthang Lairembi Temple

== Bibliography ==
- Assembly, Manipur (India). Legislative (28 November 1972). Proceedings. Official Report.
- Broadcasting, India. Ministry of Information and (2010). India: A Reference Annual. Research and Reference Division, Ministry of Information and Broadcasting, Government of India. ISBN 978-81-230-1617-7.
- Darpan, Pratiyogita (July 2008). Pratiyogita Darpan. Pratiyogita Darpan.
- Devi, L. Kunjeswori (2003). Archaeology in Manipur. Rajesh Publications. ISBN 978-81-85891-18-7.
- Dikshit, Kamal Ramprit; Dikshit, Jutta K (21 October 2013). North-East India: Land, People and Economy. Springer Science & Business Media. ISBN 978-94-007-7055-3.
- Ghosh, G. K.; Ghosh, Shukla (1 January 1997). Women of Manipur. APH Publishing. ISBN 978-81-7024-897-2.
- Laveesh, Bhandari (1 September 2009). Indian States At A Glance 2008-09: Performance, Facts And Figures - North-East And Sikkim. Pearson Education India. ISBN 978-81-317-2348-7.
- Sanajaoba, Naorem (2003). Manipur, Past and Present: The Heritage and Ordeals of a Civilization. Mittal Publications. ISBN 978-81-7099-853-2.
