= Mount Harriet =

Mount Harriet may refer to:

- Mount Harriet, India, now Mount Manipur, a peak in the Andaman and Nicobar Islands
  - Mount Harriet National Park
- Battle of Mount Harriet, an engagement in the 1982 Falklands War
