= Mount Manipur =

Mountain in the Andaman and Nicobar islands, India

- Mount Harriet

Highest point
- Elevation: 383 m (1,257 ft)
- Coordinates: 11°43′20″N 92°43′58″E

Naming
- Etymology: Manipur
- Native name: Meitei: Manipur Chingjao
- English translation: Manipur Mountain
- Pronunciation: /ma-nī-pūr chīng-jāo/
- Defining authority: Government of India

Geography
- Location: Andaman and Nicobar Islands
- Country: India
- Union territory: Andaman and Nicobar Islands
- Settlement: Island

Mount Manipur, formerly known as Mount Harriet, (Note: According to WP:COMMONNAME, the most popular name of the mountain peak, "Mount Manipur", is the appropriate title of the article. According to Google Search, "Mount Manipur" gets about 1,13,00,000 results and "Mount Harriet" gets about 1,03,00,000 results.) is the third highest peak in the Andaman and Nicobar Islands of India. The mountain houses the Mount Manipur Memorial, which commemorates the Manipuri freedom fighters of the Anglo-Manipur War and the Mount Manipur National Park (Mount Harriet National Park), which is best known for its rich biodiversity in the archipelago. On 17 October 2021, Mount Harriet was officially renamed as Mount Manipur by the Union Government of India, as a tribute to the freedom fighters of Manipur. This was initially announced by Amit Shah, the Union Home Minister of India, in a function in Port Blair, highlighting about the sacrifices of Yuvaraj Tikendrajit Singh, General Thangal, (Note: Yuvaraj Tikendrajit Singh and General Thangal were already publicly hanged in Imphal. So, the two freedom fighters were not included in the exile to the mountain of the Andaman Islands.) Meitei King Kulachandra Dhwaja Singh, the Maharajah of Manipur kingdom and other 22 freedom fighters of the Anglo-Manipur war of 1891.

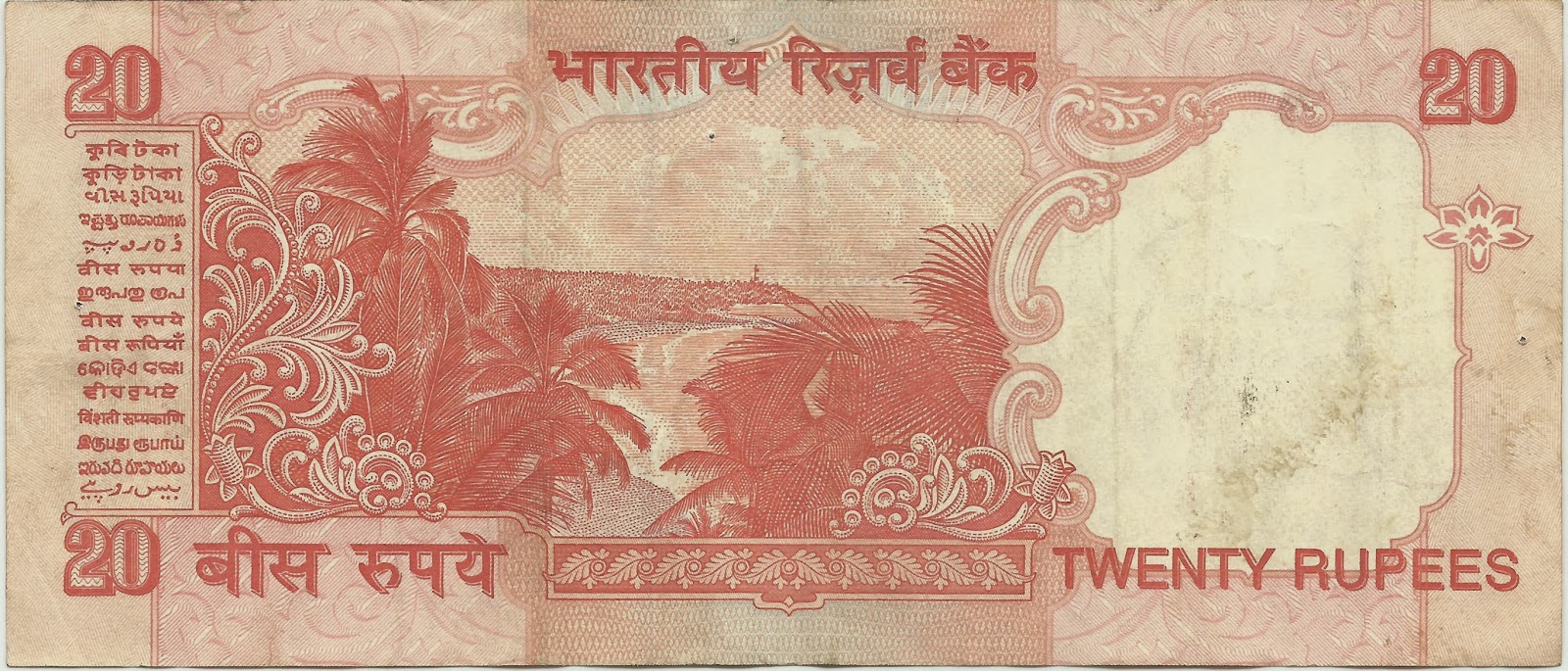
Mount Manipur (Mount Harriet) being depicted in the Indian 20-rupee note (pre-2019 edition)

The re-christening of the name of the mountain peak in honor of the Manipuri freedom fighters was given positive reactions from Manipur and Assam.

== Connection with the British ==
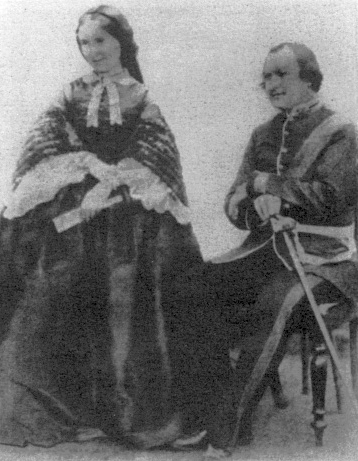
Harriet and Robert Tytler

The mountain peak's former name "Mount Harriet" was given in honor of Harriet Christina Tytler, a British artist and photographer, who was the wife of Robert Christopher Tytler, a British soldier. The peak was one of the summer headquarters of the Chief Commissioner during British Raj.

== Connection with Manipur ==
The Mount Manipur of the Andaman and Nicobar Islands of the Bay of Bengal has significant historical connections to the Manipur kingdom of Northeast India.

=== Exile of the Manipuri warriors ===
After the end of the Anglo-Manipur War in the year 1891, many Manipuri warriors were exiled to the British penal colony in the Andaman Islands. Among the exiled warriors, Meitei King Kulachandra Dhwaja Singh, the Maharajah of Manipur, was one of them. During that time, the Cellular Jail (Kalapani) was about to be built. So, Kulachandra Singh and other prisoners were imprisoned on the Mount Manipur, in the South Andaman district. In accordance to a document of the time of British Raj kept in the "Manipur State Archives", 23 men, including King Kulachandra and his brothers, were transported for life to the Andaman Islands.

=== Tracing the records of the pasts ===
In a long period of a decade between 2003 and 2013, experts and scholars from the All Manipur Working Journalists’ Union (AMWJU) visited Mount Manipur for the investigation into the information on the exiled prisoners. A. Mubi, the then Vice President of the AMWJU confirmed that Kulachandra Singh was house-arrested in the mountain.

=== Construction of a memorial site in the mountain ===
According to Ng. Uttam, the director of the Department of Art and Culture of the Government of Manipur, representatives from Manipur talked to the authorities of the Andaman and Nicobar Islands to provide a piece of land for the construction of a memorial site for the Manipuri warriors in the mountain. In the year 2019, the A&N authorities agreed to the request. A piece of land was approved near the Cellular Jail. However, due to the COVID-19 pandemic, the process of the construction was significantly delayed. The Central Government of India gave financial assistance to the Government of Manipur, regarding the construction of the memorial site in the mountain. Before the onset of the annual Indian Independence Day celebration in the year 2021, the Government of Manipur unveiled a monolith in Imphal, commemorating the sweet memories of the Manipuri "unsung war heroes".

== Gallery ==
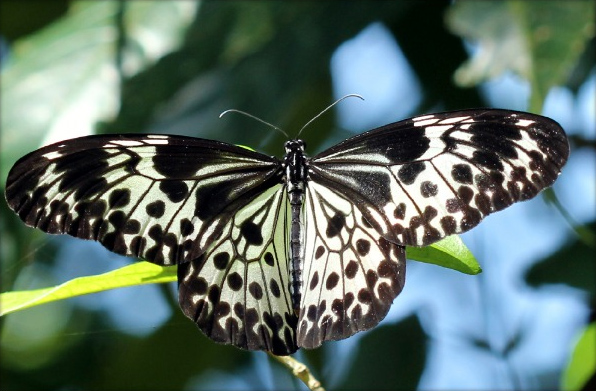

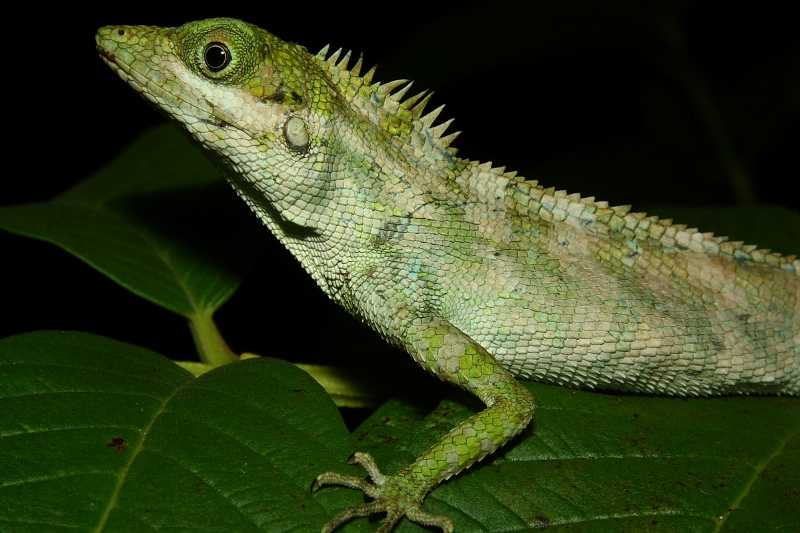

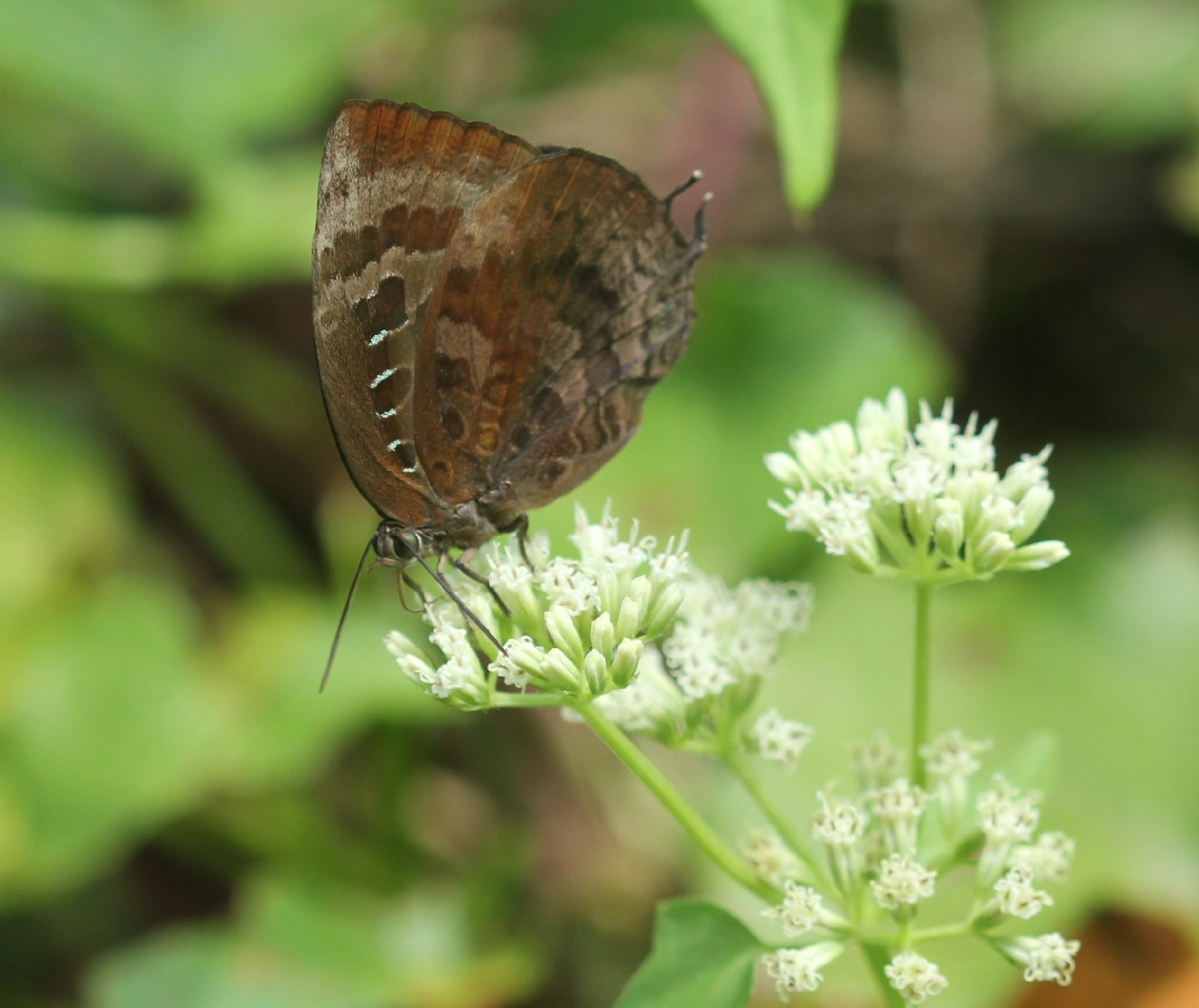

== See also ==
- Mount Thullier
- Saddle Peak (Andaman Islands)
