= Meckley =

Meckley may refer to:

- Manipur Kingdom, a kingdom in the frontier of South Asia and Southeast Asia
- Manipur state, a state in Northeast India
- Meckley language, another term for Meitei language
- Meckley people, another term for Meitei people
