= Kulachandra Singh =

Maharaja of Manipur kingdom

- Ningthou & Maharaja
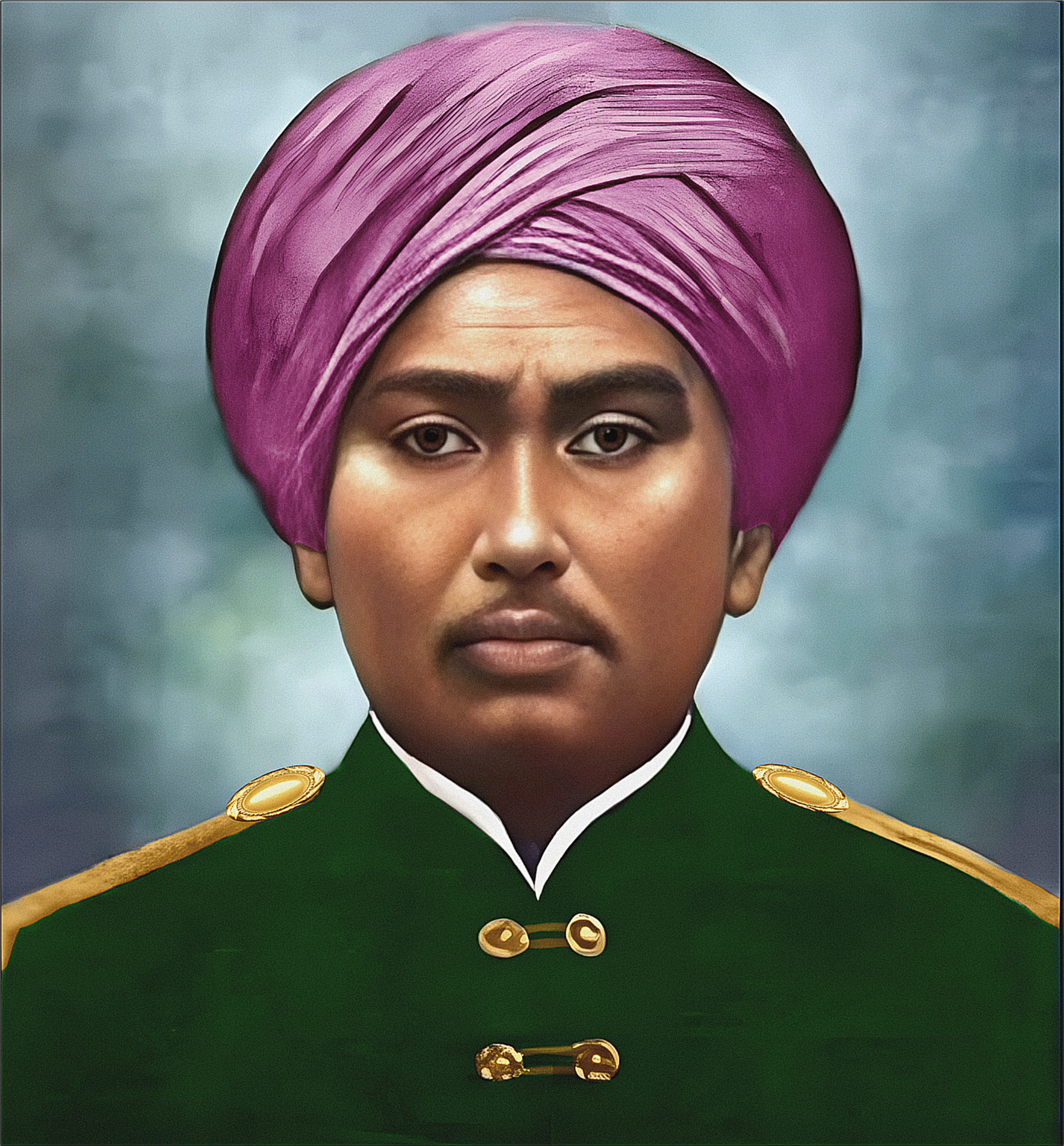
- Kulachandra Singh
- Reign: 1890–1891
- Predecessor: Surachandra Singh
- Successor: Churachand Singh
- Born: Manipur Kingdom
- Died: Andaman and Nicobar Islands
- Burial: Andaman and Nicobar Islands
- House: House of Karta
- Dynasty: Ningthouja dynasty
- Occupation: monarch

Kulachandra Singh was a Meitei monarch and the Maharaja of the Manipur kingdom. He was a son of Maharaja Chandrakriti.

== Exile to the Cellular Jail ==
At the end of the Anglo-Manipur War in the year 1891, which resulted in the British victory, Kulachandra Singh and other 22 Manipuri freedom fighters were exiled to the then British penal colony in the Andaman and Nicobar Islands. At the time of their exile, the Cellular Jail (Kalapani) was about to be built in the island. So, Kulachandra Singh and the other 22 men were imprisoned on the Mount Manipur (Mount Harriet) in the present-day South Andaman district.

== Commemoration ==
=== Re-christening of a mountain peak ===
Paying tribute to Kulachandra Singh's sacrifice for his motherland Manipur and spending the rest of his life in the Andaman Islands, the Union Government of India officially renamed the Mount Harriet into Mount Manipur and the Mount Harriet National Park into Mount Manipur National Park. During October 2021, Amit Shah, a Union Home Minister of the Republic of India, initially announced the re-christening of the mountain and the national park.

=== Mount Manipur Memorial ===
Mount Manipur Memorial is a memorial site that commemorates and pays tribute to Meitei King Kulachandra Singh and the other exiled freedom fighters. The site is being built in Mount Manipur (Mount Harriet) by the Government of Manipur, through an agreement with the authorities of the Andaman and Nicobar Islands, assisted by the Union Government of India.

== See also ==
- List of Manipuri kings
- Manipur (princely state)

| Preceded by Surachandra Singh | King of Manipur; 1890–1891 | Succeeded by Churachandra |
