= Chandrakirti Singh =

Meitei king of Manipur Kingdom

- Ningthou
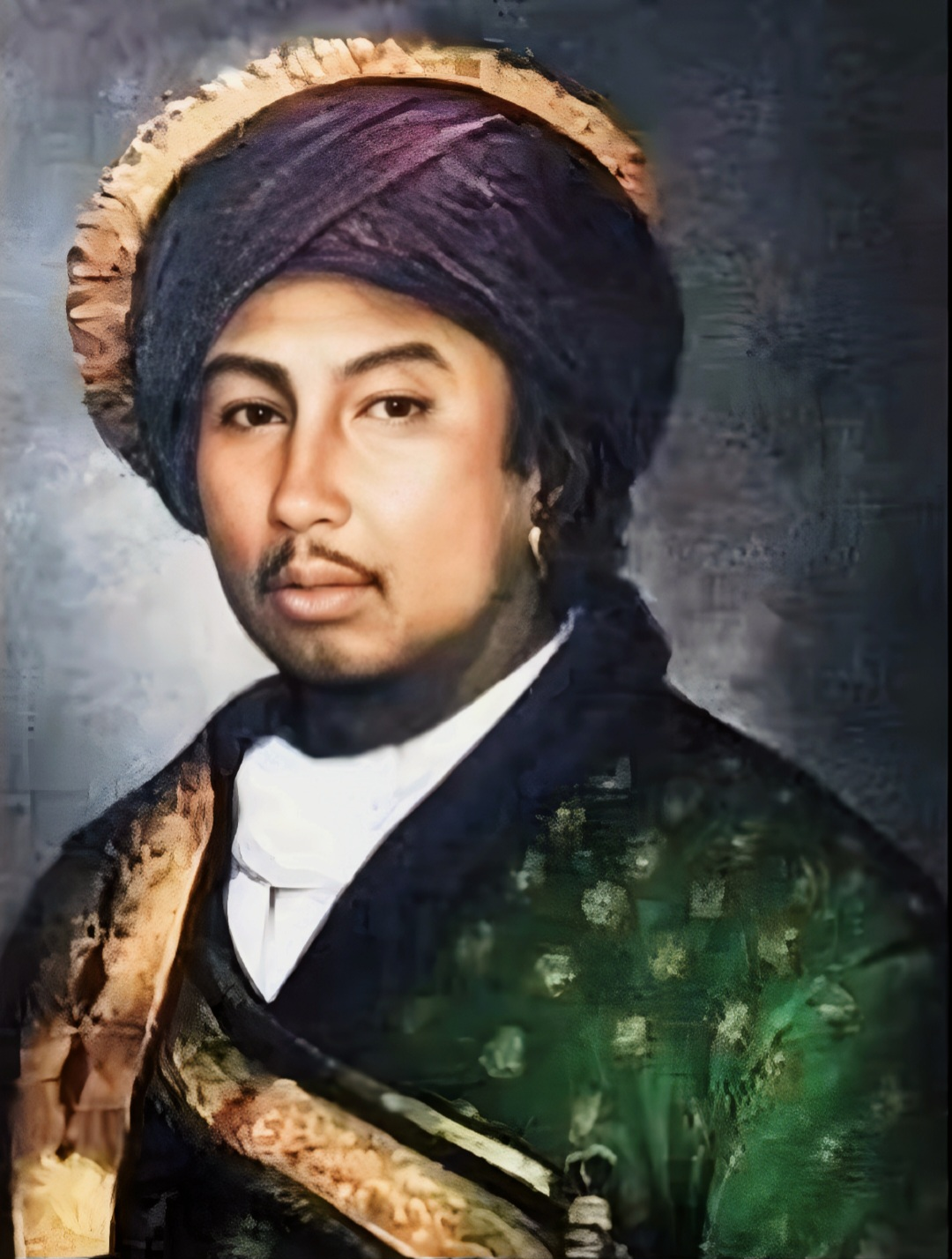
- Chandrakirti Singh

King of Manipur
- Reign: 1834-1844
- Predecessor: Gambhir Singh
- Successor: Nara Singh
- Regent: Nara Singh
- Reign: 1850–May 1886
- Predecessor: Debindro Singh
- Successor: Surachandra Singh
- Born: 1831; Manipur Kingdom
- Died: May 20, 1886 (aged 54–55)
- Issue: Surachandra Singh Kulachandra Singh Tikendrajit Singh
Names
- Naojinglen Nongdren Khomba
Posthumous name
- Ningthem Pisak
Temple name
- Shree Govindajee Temple
- House: House of Karta
- Father: Gambhir Singh
- Occupation: monarch

Chandrakirti Singh KCSI (1831–1886) was a Meitei king of the Manipur Kingdom. He was the son of Raja Gambhir Singh.

== Biography ==
He was born in Imphal, and resided there till the end of his regime in 1886. Before he became the king, the reign of his father Gambhir Singh was succeeded by Raja Nara singh and, later on his death, by his brother Debindro Singh for a short time.

== Reign and later life ==
=== First reign as Ningthempisak ===
After the death of Raja Gambhir Singh, Chandrakirti Singh ascended the throne of Manipur at the young age of 2 years old with the title of Ningthempisak which meant "young king" or "little king". During his early years, Nara Singh served as the regent of Manipur from 1832 to 1844. Following this period, Nara Singh ruled the kingdom himself from 1844 to 1850, while Chandrakirti Singh and his mother, Queen Dowager Maharani Kumudini Devi, took refuge in Assam. After Nara Singh’s death in 1850, Chandrakirti Singh returned to Manipur and reclaimed the throne after dethroning Debindro Singh.

=== Second reign and relationship with the British ===
From 1850 to 1886, Maharaja Chandrakirti Singh ruled Manipur for thirty-five years, a time generally marked by stability and progress. He received strong support from several British Political Agents, including McCulloch, Dr. R. Brown, and James Johnstone. With British assistance—particularly through the supply of firearms—he was able to maintain order among the Naga tribes and help define the boundaries between Manipur and the Naga Hills.

Prior to his reign, Kuki settlers were established in villages along Manipur’s southern frontier. Many Kukis were enlisted in the state’s army, forming a contingent known as the Kuki Irregulars. The British administration helped suppress rival claimants to the Manipuri throne, strengthening Chandrakirti’s authority. Under his leadership, trade, crafts, and local industries flourished.

During the British Lushai Expedition, Chandrakirti Singh was asked to send troops to Tseklapai on the southern frontier of Manipur, to keep watch on Kamhau-Suktes. The troops instead moved ahead to Chivu salt springs, encroaching into then-ungoverned tribal territory, and planted a victory stone at that location. Even though the British frowned on this exercise, later in 1890, they set Manipur's border near the Chivu salt springs.

=== Military ===
Manipur aided the British in the Naga Revolt of 1879–1880, sending around 2,000 Manipuri soldiers and Kuki Irregulars under the command of Crown Prince Surachandra Singh, assisted by Prince Tikendrajit and General Thangal, to suppress uprisings in Khonoma and Kohima. Later, Manipur also supported British forces in the Third Anglo-Burmese War (1885), contributing to the conquest of the Upper Chindwin region of Burma. Maharaja Chandrakirti Singh maintained a cordial relationship with the British, especially with Sir James Johnstone, the Political Agent in Manipur. In recognition of his cooperation, he was honored with the title of KCSI (Knight Commander of the Star of India) in 1874.

== The Jila Durbar ==
On 11 August 1874, Maharaja Chandrakirti Singh journeyed to the neighbouring British-administered region of Assam near the banks of the Barak (near Malugram, Cachar)

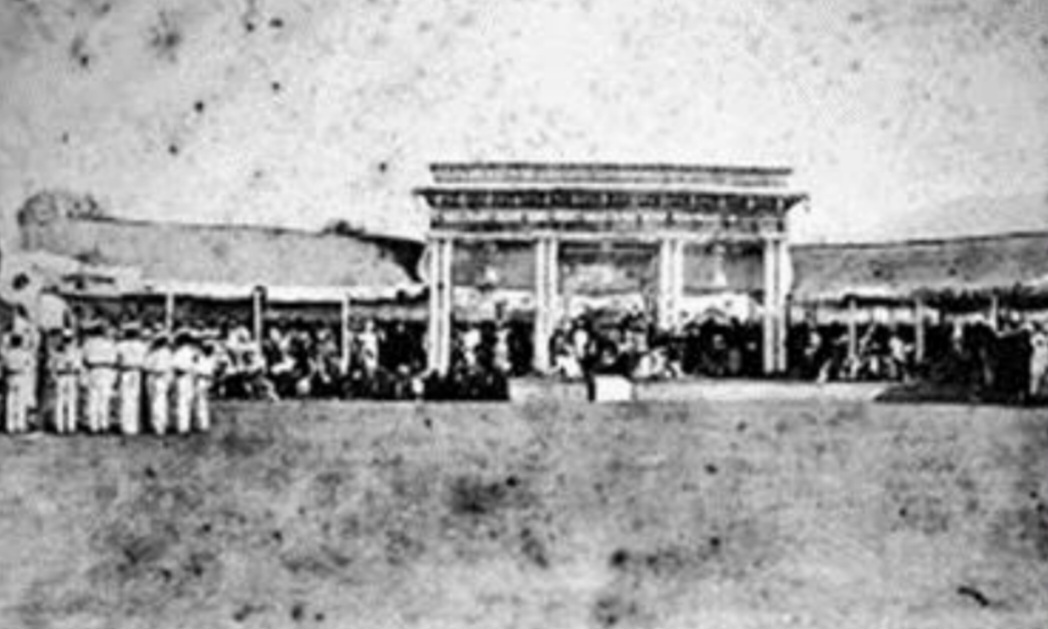
Malugram, Cachar In which The Jila Durbar took place

Prior to this the audience and the Maharaja travelled in state from Kangla with an official procession, a scene commemorated in Meitei paintings and contemporary accounts.

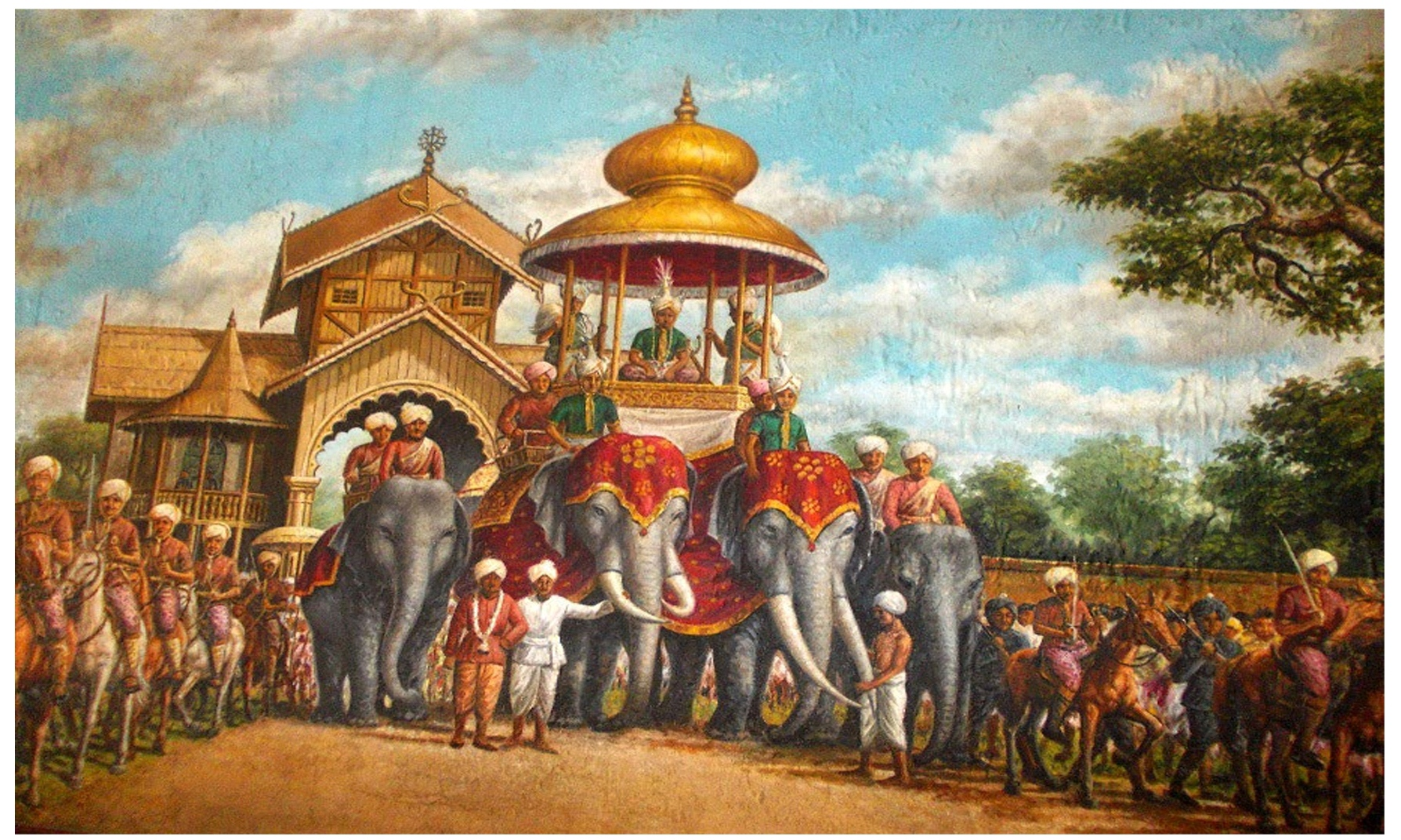
A classical Meitei painting depicting Meitei king Chandrakirti of Manipur riding on elephants, on the way to “Jila Durbar”

He came there to attend a formal durbar (courtly reception) with the then Viceroy of India,Thomas Baring, 1st Earl of Northbrook

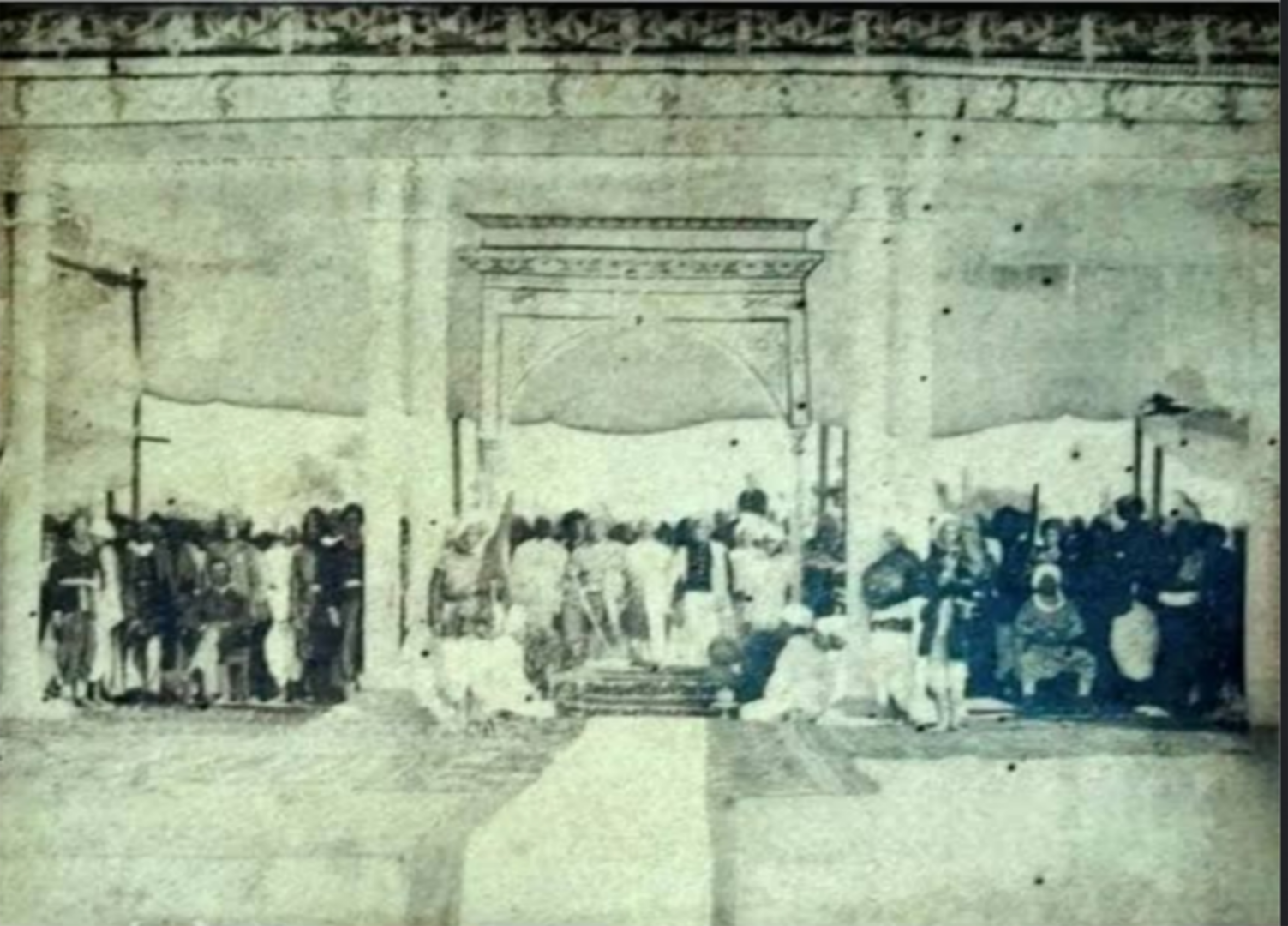
A scene from inside the Jila Durbar.

Prior to the audience, the Maharaja and his retinue proceeded in a grand procession from the Imphal valley across the frontier, arriving at Lakhipur, where they were received with full ceremonial honours—"two thousand mighty and valorous British troops with sparkling belts waited for the king” according to local accounts, At the durbar itself the Maharaja formally presented his homage (nazar) to the Viceroy, and in return received the title of KCSI from the British side. In his address during a subsequent durbar (January 1877), Chandrakirti acknowledged Manipur’s status in relation to the British Indian administration.

This Came to be known as the Jila/Zila Durbar or Chandrakirti Jila Changba

== Works written during his Reign ==
Khahi Ngamba

A Meitei classical language historical work. It was written during his reign. The work was composed to celebrate the victory of Maharaja Gambhir Singh over the Khasiyas in 1829.

== Death ==
Chandrakirti Singh died in 1886 at the age of 55.

== Descendants ==
Chandrakirti had ten sons from his six queens 1) First Queen: Raja Surachandra Singh was the eldest son of the other three sons (Pakasana, Kesarjit, Gopalsana)

2) Second Queen: Raja Kulachandra Singh(the second son of the second queen) and Gandhar Singh (another son)

3) Third queen: Tikendrajit Singh (the third son of the third queen),

4) Fourth queen: Jhalakirti (died in his early days)

5) Fifth Queen: Angousana (the fifth son of the fifth queen)

6) Sixth Queen: Zila Ngamba (the eighth son of the sixth queen).

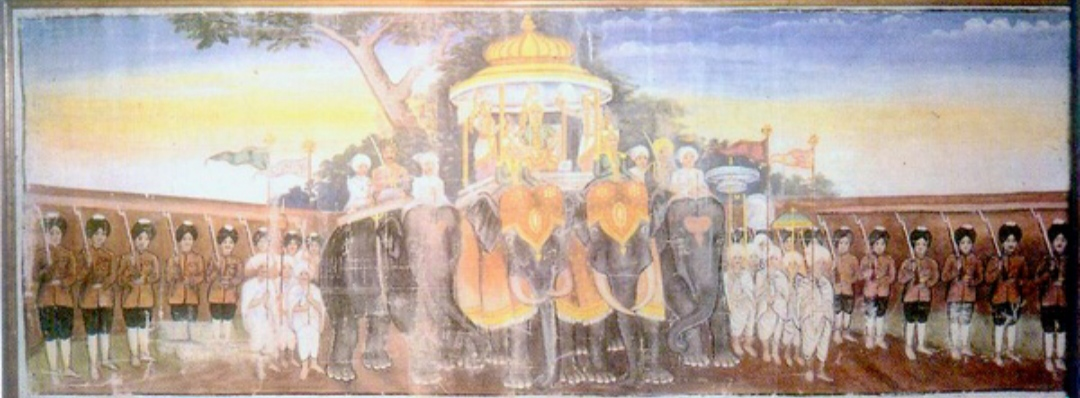
A traditional Meitei painting depicting “Jila Durbar” (“Jila Darbar”), the procession of Meitei King Chandrakirti, the Maharaja of Kangleipak (Manipur), riding on the Meitei royal elephants

== See also ==
- List of Manipuri kings
- Manipur (princely state)

== Bibliography ==
- Hodson, Thomas Callan.The Meitheis. Harvard University, 1908.

Preceded by Debindro Singh	King of Manipur; 1850–May 1886	Succeeded by Surachandra Singh
