= Tikendrajit Singh =

- Yuvaraj
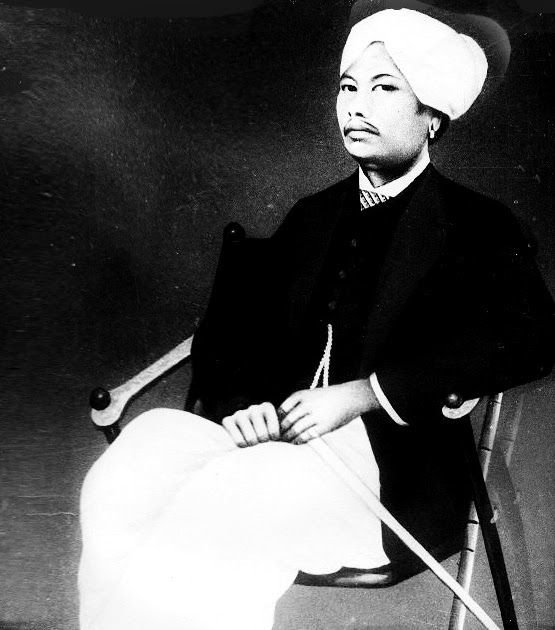
- Yubaraj Tikendrajit Singh, a crown prince of Kangleipak (Meitei for 'Manipur kingdom')
- Born: Meitei: Koireng Sana; 29 December 1856; Kangleipak
- Died: 13 August 1891 (aged 34); Kangleipak
- Burial: Kangleipak
- Meitei: Koireng Sana
- House: Ningthouja dynasty
- Father: Chandrakirti Singh
- Occupation: crown prince

Tikendrajit Singh (29 December 1856 – 13 August 1891), also known as Koireng, was a crown prince of Kangleipak (Meitei for 'Manipur kingdom') in present-day northeastern India, which was a protectorate of British Raj at that time. Tikendrajit was the commander of the Manipuri army and engineered a palace revolution that led to the events known as the Anglo-Manipur War of 1891 or the Manipur Expedition.

== The Anglo-Manipur War ==
After Maharaja Chandrakriti's death in 1886, his son Surachandra Singh succeeded him. As in previous occasions, several claimants to the throne tried to unsettle the new king. The first three attempts were defeated, but in 1890, following an attack on the palace by Tikendrajit and Kulachandra Singh (two of the king's brothers) Surachandra Singh announced his intention to abdicate and left Manipur for Cachar.

Kulachandra Singh, the king's younger brother, rose then to the throne while Tikendrajit Singh, commander of the Manipuri armed forces (Senapati), held the real power behind the scenes. Meanwhile, Surachandra Singh, once safely away from Manipur, appealed to the British for help to recover the throne.

The British decided to recognize Juvraj Kulachandra Singh as Raja, and sent a military expedition to Manipur in order to punish Senapati Tikendrajit Singh as the main person responsible for the dynastic disturbances. On 21 February 1891 Lord Lansdowne, the British viceroy of India, ordered J.W. Quinton, the chief commissioner of Assam, to recognise Jubraj Kulachandra Singh as the King but to arrest Senapati Tikendrajit. Quinton arrived in Manipur on 22 March 1891 with a troop of 400 soldiers under Colonel Skene and asked Raja Kulachandra Singh to hand over Tikendrajit to him as desired by the British Governor General of India. The Manipuri soldiers struck back and the British were put on the defensive. In the ensuing chaos, five British officers, including the Political Agent Frank Grimwood and Quinton, were killed.

On 31 March 1891 the British Government sent a military force against Manipur formed by three army columns from Kohima (under the command of Major General H. Collet), Silchar (under the command of Colonel R.H.F. Rennick) and Tamu (under the command of Brigadier General T. Graham) were sent to Manipur. Tikendrajit led the Manipuri army in this war. The British army finally took possession of the Kangla Palace on 27 April 1891. Major Maxwell took over as the chief political agent. Later, Manipur became a princely state and Churachand Singh, a minor was placed on the throne of Manipur. Tikendrajit and other leaders of Manipur subsequently went underground. Tikendrajit was arrested in the evening of 23 May. Ethel Grimwood was consulted by Queen Victoria who was concerned that a Prince would be hung when the British appeared treacherous. Grimwood said that she did not hold Tikendrajit responsible for her husband's death, but she felt that he had committed other crimes.

== The trial and death ==
The special court, formed under Lt. Col. John Mitchell for the trial commenced on 11 May 1891. The court found Tikendrajit, Kulachandra and Thangal General guilty and they were sentenced to death. The Governor General confirmed the death sentence passed on Tikendrajit and Thangal General and converted the death sentence of the Maharaja and Angousan into transportation for life. The order was announced on 13 August 1891 and Tikendrajit and Thangal General were publicly hanged at 5 pm the same day at Pheida-pung (Polo ground) in Imphal.

Pheida-pung is also known for its purpose of serving as court for market matter. After independence, this ground in Imphal where Tikendrajit was hanged was renamed as Bir Tikendrajit Park.

== See also ==
- List of Meitei royals
- Manipur (princely state)
- Ethel Grimwood
