= Christopher Gimson =

English cricketer and colonial administrator

Christopher Gimson CIE (24 December 1886 – 8 November 1975) was an English cricketer and colonial administrator.

== Biography ==
Gimson was born in Leicester, where the Gimson family was prominent. Christopher is said to have been exceptionally tall, so that his uncle Ernest Gimson made a special 7ft single oak bed for him. He was educated at Oundle School and Emmanuel College, Cambridge. He played cricket for Cambridge University and later for Leicestershire. He appeared in nine first-class matches as a right-handed batsman, scoring a total of 175 runs with a highest score of 40.

Gimson joined the Indian Civil Service in 1911 and spent most of his career in Manipur, eventually becoming Political Agent there in 1933. He retired in 1947 and returned to Leicester, where he died in 1975. He was president of the Leicester Literary and Philosophical Society 1955–56.

Gimson was appointed CIE in the 1943 New Year Honours.
