= Anglo-Manipur War =

1891 Armed Conflict Between Manipur Kingdom and British

Anglo-Manipur War Manipur Rebellion of 1891
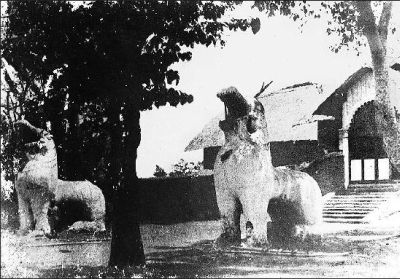
- The sculptures of two dragons in front of the Kangla Palace were destroyed during the war.
Date	31 March – 27 April 1891
Location	Kingdom of Manipur
Result	British victory, Meidingngu Churachand declared as king

Belligerents
India	Kingdom of Manipur

Commanders and leaders
(British Raj) Lord Lansdowne (British Raj) Major General H. Colle	Maharajah Kulachandra Singh (POW); Jubraj Tikendrajit (executed)

Strength
+395; 2 mountain guns 350 rifles	+3,200; 2 mountain guns

Casualties and losses
4 Killed In Action; 15 Wounded In Action	+178 Killed In Action; 5 executed

The Anglo-Manipur War or Manipuri Rebellion of 1891 was an armed conflict between the British Raj and the Manipur Kingdom.

The conflict began with a palace coup staged by the general (Senapati) of Manipur, ousting the then-reigning king, Maharaja Surchandra, and installing a half-brother of the king, the heir-apparent, in his place. The British Raj objected to the action and attempted to arrest the general. The effort failed, with the Manipuri forces attacking the British residency and killing the Resident and other British officials present.

The British Raj responded by launching a military operation lasting from 31 March to 27 April 1891. The general and other rebels were arrested and convicted. Manipur was converted into an Indian princely state, subject to British Paramountcy.

== Background ==
In the First Anglo-Burmese War, the British helped Prince Gambhir Singh regain his kingdom of Manipur, which had been heretofore occupied by the Burmese. Subsequently, Manipur became a British protectorate. This was certainly the British view, and is also acknowledged by several scholars. From 1835, the British stationed a Political Agent in Manipur, and succession arrangements were settled by the British Government of India. However, there was no treaty between the British and Manipur confirming these arrangements. Consequently, the Manipuris tended to regard themselves as an independent state. (Note: The British position was stated by the Viceroy of India as follows: "Manipur is a subordinate Native State. We rendered it independent of Burma. We have recognized succession in Manipur and have asserted suzerainty in many ways; and Manipur ruling family have repeatedly acknowledged their position of dependence.".)

Manipur had been a frontier state, in fact a "buffer state", against Burma until 1885. With the Third Anglo-Burmese War that year and the British annexation of Upper Burma, Manipur's frontier status had vanished, as had its strategic importance. The free supply of arms and ammunition that the British had provided Manipur were gradually reduced and removed.

In 1890, the reigning Maharaja was Surachandra Singh. His half-brother Kulachandra Singh was the jubraj (heir apparent) (Note: From Sanskrit yuvarāja, also spelt yubraj or jubraj in the northeast India.) and another half-brother Tikendrajit Singh was the military commander (senapati). Frank Grimwood was the British Political Agent. Tikendrajit is said to have been the most able of the three siblings,and was also friendly with the Political Agent. According to historian Katherine Prior, the drying up of arms supplies led Tikendrajit to doubt the value of the British alliance. Historian Jangkhomang Guite states that, at the same time, the British were contemplating the introduction of reforms in the administration of Manipur, such as abolition of slavery and reform in trade, but Tikendrajit stood in their way.

== Coup and rebellion ==
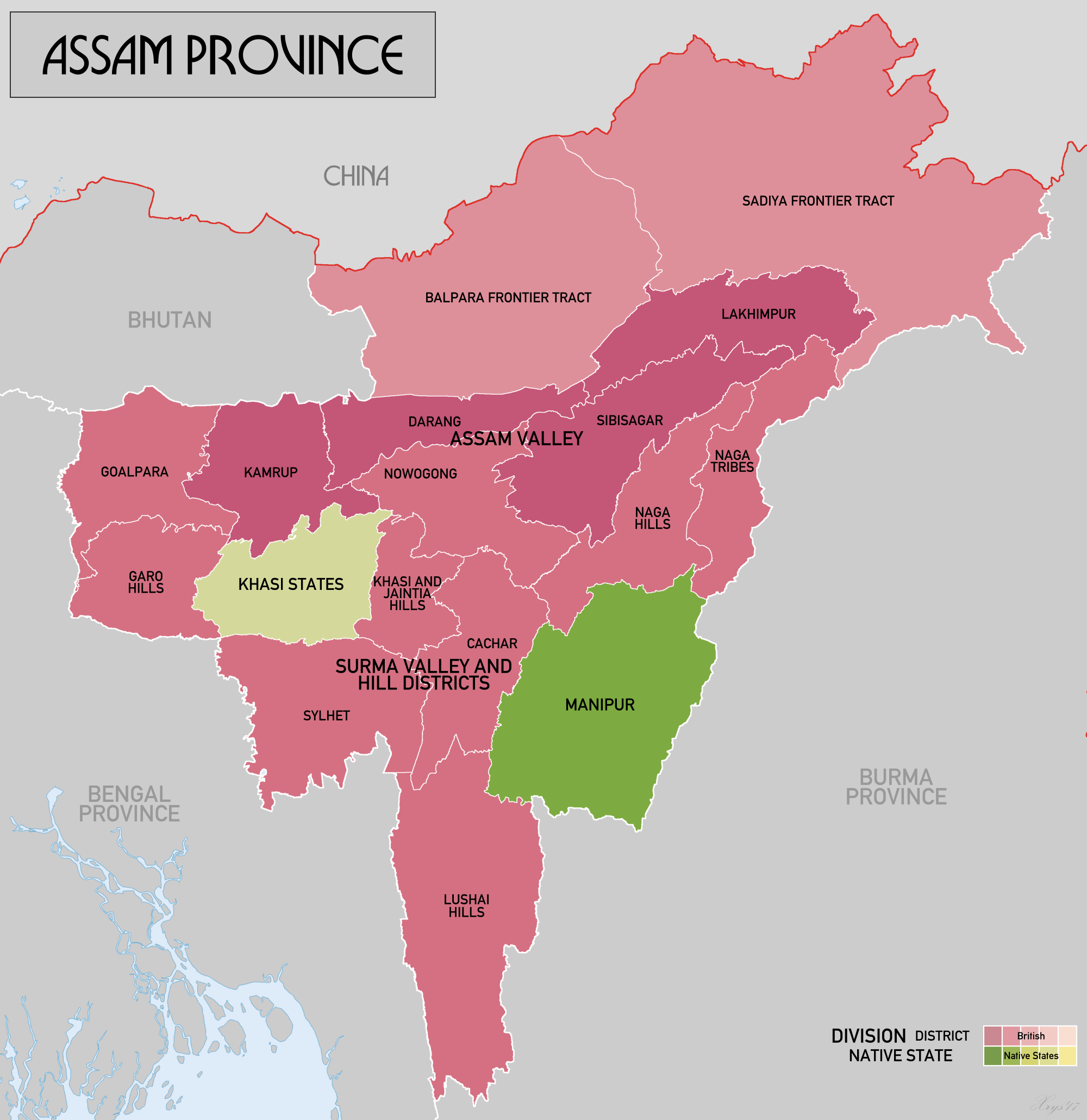
The Assam province (1931) together with the princely state of Manipur

On 21 September 1890, Tikendrajit Singh led a palace coup, ousting Maharaja Surachandra Singh and installing Kulachandra Singh as the ruler. He also pronounced himself as the new Jubraj. (Note: It is reported that Kulachandra Singh was absent at the time of the coup. So his role in the affair is not clear.) Surachandra Singh took refuge in British residency, where Grimwood assisted him to flee the state. The Maharaja had given the impression that he was abdicating the throne but, after reaching the British territory in the neighbouring Assam Province, he recanted and wanted to return to the state. Both the Political Agent and the Chief Commissioner of Assam, James Wallace Quinton, dissuaded him from returning.

Surachandra Singh reached Calcutta and appealed to the Government of India, reminding the British of the services he had rendered. On 24 January 1891, the Governor-General instructed the Chief Commissioner of Assam to settle the matter by going to Manipur:

The Governor-General in Council thinks that you should visit Manipur, for the avowed purpose of making, and, if necessary, enforcing, a decision on the merits of the case. You should probably have with you a sufficient force to overcome the conspirators. It is probable that a very small body of troops would be enough, and that sufficient numbers could be taken from Cachar or Kohima.

The Chief Commissioner Quinton persuaded the Government in Calcutta that there would be no use trying to reinstate the Maharaja. This was agreed, but the Government wanted the Senapati Tikendrajit Singh disciplined.

Quinton arrived in Manipur on 22 March 1891, with an escort of 400 Gurkhas under the command of Colonel Skene. The plan was to hold a Darbar in the residency with the erstwhile Jubraj Kulachandra Singh (now regarded as the Regent) attending along with all the nobles, where a demand would be made to surrender the senapati. The Regent came to attend the Darbar, but the senapati did not. Another attempt was made the next day which was also unsuccessful. Quinton ordered the arrest of Senapati in his own fort, which was evidently repulsed, and the residency itself was besieged. Finally Quinton went on to negotiate with Tikendrajit, accompanied by Grimwood, Skene, and other British officers. The talks failed and while returning, the British party was attacked by an "angry crowd". Grimwood was speared to death. The others escaped to the fort. But during the night the crowd led them out and killed them, Quinton included. (Note: According to the Manipur State Archives, they were executed upon the orders of Tikendrajit Singh.)

According to later accounts, Quinton had proposed to Kulachandra Singh a cessation of all hostilities and his return to Kohima (in Naga Hills to the north of Manipur). Kulachandra and Tikendrajit regarded the proposals as deception.

The surviving British troops besieged in the residency were led out by two junior officers in the dead of night, along with Frank Grimwood's wife Ethel Grimwood. It was a disorganised retreat. But they were met in the forests by a relief party arriving from Cachar and were rescued. The Residency was set on fire soon after their departure.

Ethel Grimwood, the only woman in the retreat from the residency was later lionised as a heroine of the "Manipur Disaster" when she returned to Britain. She received a medal, £1,000, and a civil list pension. She later wrote her biography. According to scholar K. D. Reynolds, her contribution is unclear, but a hero was required and Ethel became that hero.

== War ==
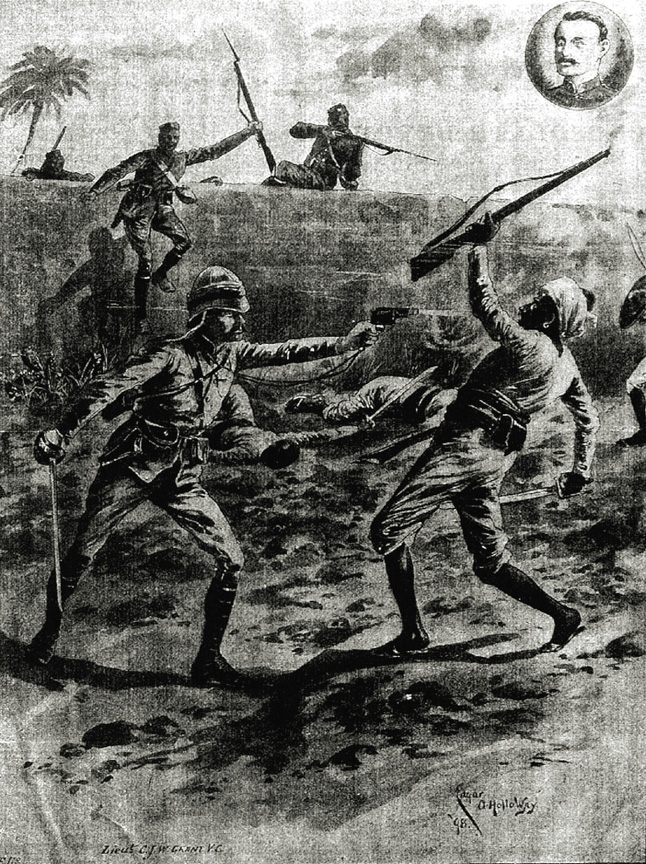
Lieutenant CJW Grant, during the action at Thoubal, on 1 April 1891.

On 27 March 1891, news of the executions reached the British forces stationed at Tamu (a Burmese town on the border with Manipur). Lieutenant Charles James William Grant took the initiative to lead a contingent of 50 soldiers of the 12th (Burma) Madras Infantry and 35 members of the 43rd Gurkha Regiment, to handle the situation.

On 31 March 1891, the Tamu column seized the village of Thoubal after ousting an 800-man Manipuri garrison. On 1 April, 2,000 Manipuri soldiers, accompanied by two guns, laid siege to the village. Grant's troops repelled numerous attacks during the course of nine days. On 9 April, the Tamu column retreated from Thoubal in order to join the other columns after being reinforced by 100 rifles led by Captain Presgrave of the 12th (Burma) Madras Infantry. Manipur forces suffered heavy casualties during the engagement at Thoubal while the British lost one soldier dead and four wounded.

While the Tamu column was engaged in Thoubal, orders were sent to Kohima (in Naga Hills) and Silchar (in Cachar) to send expeditionary forces to Manipur. The Kohima column was launched on 20 April, encountering no resistance apart from coming under rifle fire four days later. On 21 April, the Silchar column reached Thoubal, the next day, the Tamu column clashed with Manipur troops outside Pallel. After the latter pursued the British troops, the Manipuris were once more pushed back. On 23 April, Manipur troops led by Poila Meiraba met the British troops at Kakching where Meiraba was killed in action along with 20 soldiers.

On 25 April, British scouts encountered 500 Manipuri soldiers on the Khongjom hillock in the vicinity of Pallel.This battle is popularly known as Khongjom Battle being the last battle of the Anglo-Manipur War. 350 infantrymen, 44 cavalry and 2 guns mounted an assault on the remainder of the Manipur army. Hand-to-hand fighting ensued, two British soldiers were killed and 11 were severely injured, while the Manipuri lost over 128 men including the death of high-ranking officials such as Major Paona Brajabasi, Heirang Kongja and Chinglensana.

On 27 April 1891, the Silchar, Tamu and Kohima columns united, capturing Imphal after finding it deserted. The Union Jack was hoisted above the Kangla Palace, 62 native loyalists were freed by the British troops. On 23 May 1891, Tikendrajit Singh was detained by British authorities On 13 August 1891, five Manipuri commanders including Tikendrajit ,were hanged for waging war against the British Empire, Kulachandra Singh along with 21 Manipuri noblemen, who received sentences of property forfeiture and transportation for life. Manipur underwent a disarmament campaign, 4,000 firearms were confiscated from the local population.

On 22 September 1891, the British placed the young boy Meidingngu Churachand on the throne.

== Legacy ==
Ethel Grimwood was given £1,000, a pension and the Royal Red Cross (despite having no links to nursing). British participants of the Manipuri expedition received the North East Frontier clasp for the India General Service Medal. Colonel Charles James William Grant also received the Victoria Cross, for his actions during the battle of Thoubal. In 2021, the medal was auctioned along with other collectible items for an estimated sum of £420,000.

13 August is commemorated yearly as "Patriots Day" in Manipur, with remarks to honour the Manipuri soldiers that lost their lives during the war. Tikendrajit Singh's portrait is included in the National Portrait Gallery inside the House of the People in New Delhi. 23 April is also observed as the "Khongjom Day", marking the occasion of the battle of Khongjom.

== See also ==
- British expedition to Tibet
- Khongjom War Memorial Complex
- Insurgency in Manipur
- Sikkim Expedition

== Bibliography ==
- Ahmad, Maj Rifat Nadeem, and Ahmed, Maj Gen Rafiuddin. (2006). Unfaded Glory: The 8th Punjab Regiment 1798–1956. Abbottabad: The Baloch Regimental Centre.
- Aitchison, C. U., ed. (1931), A Collection of Treaties, Engagements and Sanads Relating to India and Neighbouring Countries, vol. XII, Calcutta: Government of India, Central Publication Branch – via archive.org
- Sudhirkumar Singh (2011). Socio-religious and Political Movements in Modern Manipur. Jawaharlal Nehru University. pp. 46–49. hdl:10603/121665.
- Guite, Jangkhomang (2015). "One Event, Two States". Indian Historical Review. 42 (2): 226–260. doi:10.1177/0376983615597381. ISSN 0376-9836.
- Lee-Warner, Sir William (1894), The Protected Princes of India, Macmillan and Company
- Majumdar, R. C. (1960), "Rebellion in Manipur, 1891", Indian Historical Records Commission, Proceedings Volume XXXV, Part II, Manager of Publications, Government of India – via archive.org
- Majumdar, R. C., ed. (2002) [1963], British Paramountcy and Indian Renaissance, Part I, History and Culture of Indian People, vol. IX (4th ed.), Bharatiya Vidya Bhavan – via archive.org
- Tarapot, Phanjoubam (2003), Bleeding Manipur, Har-Anand Publications, ISBN 978-81-241-0902-1
- Temple, Richard (June 1891), "The Manipur Blue-Book", The Contemporary Review, 59: 917–924
