= Surachandra Singh =

- Ningthou
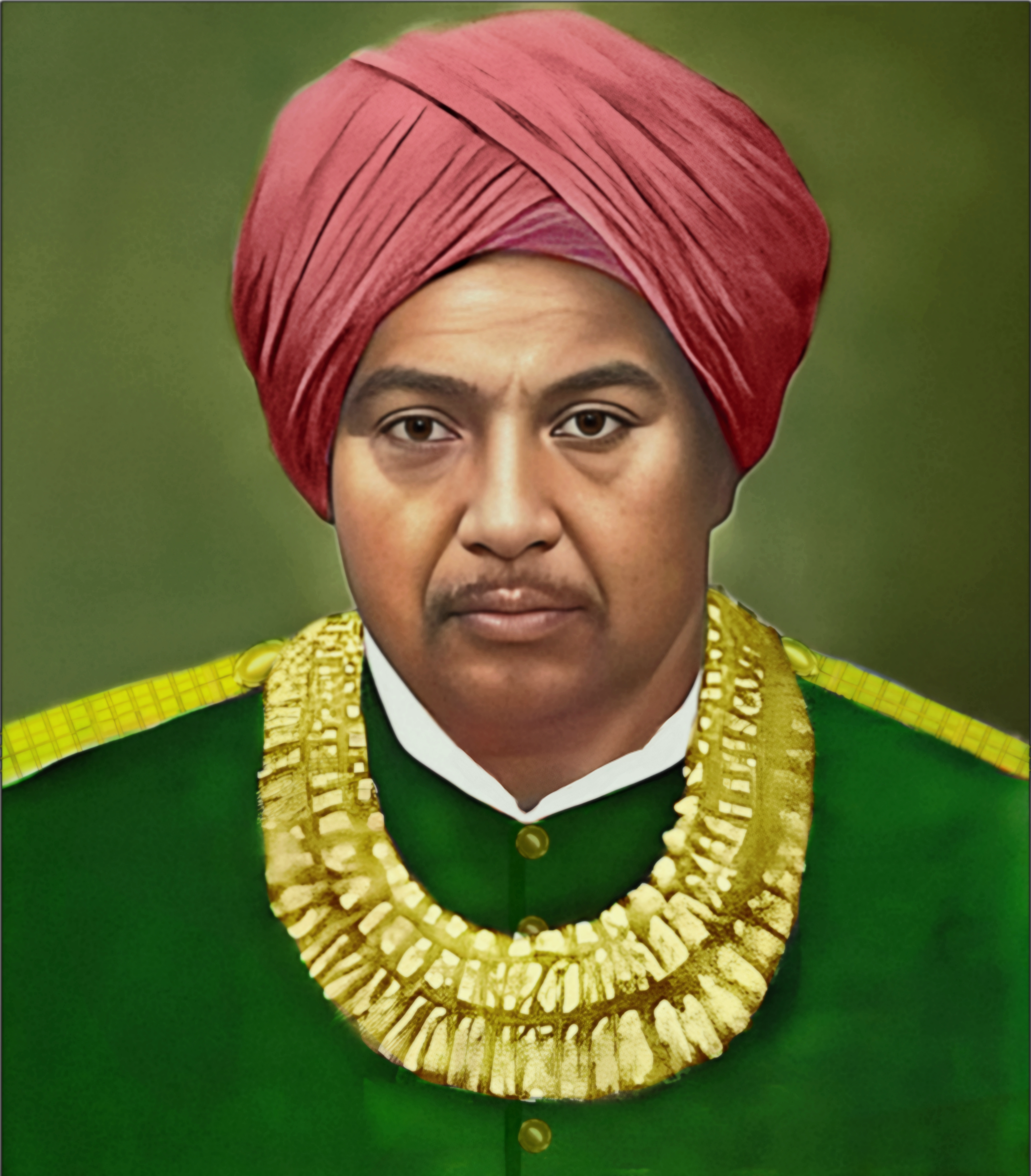
- Predecessor: Chandrakirti Singh
- Successor: Kulachandra Singh
- Born: Kangleipak
- Died: Calcutta
- Burial: Calcutta
- royal: Ningthouja dynasty
- royal: Ningthouja dynasty
- Dynasty: Ningthouja dynasty
- Occupation: monarch

Surachandra Singh was a Meitei King and a Maharaja of Kangleipak (Meitei for 'Manipur kingdom'), who ruled between 1886 and 1890. He became the Raja of Manipur in May 1886 after his father RMjharaa Chandrakirti Singh, died.

During his lifetime, Maharaja Chandrakirti made efforts to ensure that the Government of India and the British recognised his eldest son, Surachandra, as his successor.

The British political agent wanted that the guarantee regarding succession should be extended to the son of Surchandra also. But the Maharaja desired that after Surchandra, as was the tradition followed in Manipur, the brothers of Surchandra should be the king. The Government of India recognised Maharaja Surchandra as the Maharaja of Manipur.

The public avowal made by the Government of India during his father's lifetime was made applicable in his case also. Under this commitment, the British Government was bound to punish anybody who tried to dethrone Maharaja Surchandra.

During the reign of Surchandra, there were three revolts; one by Borachaoba, the eldest son of Maharaja Nara Singh, and two others by Wangkheirakpa and Jogendro Singh.

== See also ==
- List of Manipuri kings
- Manipur (princely state)

== Bibliography ==
- Hodson, Thomas Callan. The Meitheis. Harvard University, 1908.

| Preceded by Chandrakirti Singh | King of Manipur; 1886–May 1890 | Succeeded by Kulachandra Singh |
