= Debindro Singh =

Manipuri King

Debindro Singh or Devendra Singh or Devendrajit Singh or Debendra Singh (died 1871) was a Manipuri King who ruled in 1850 for a period of only three months at the age of forty-seven. He ended the custom of paying bribes to chiefs to gain land in Manipur. He was the successor to, and brother of Nara Singh, the regent of Gambhir Singh. He was given the title of Raja by the British, but he was unpopular. After only three months Chandrakirti Singh invaded Manipur while Devendra Singh fled to Cachar.

He was later taken to Dhaka, now in Bangladesh, by the British in 1850 and settled there with a large number of followers. That is why he is also known as Dacca Taba Ningthou.

Devendra Singh died at Sylhet in 1871.

His daughter, Princess Kaboklei or Dhaka Rani married Maharaj Birchandra, King of Tripura.

== See also ==
- List of Manipuri kings
- Manipur (princely state)

== Bibliography ==
- Hodson, Thomas Callan.The Meitheis. Harvard University, 1908.
- Sanajaoba, Naorem (Ed). (1988). Manipur, Past and Present: The Heritage and Ordeals of a Civilization, Volume 4. New Delhi, India: Mittal Publications.

| Preceded by Raja Nara Singh | King of Manipur; 1850 (three months) | Succeeded by Chandrakirti Singh |
