= Ningthou =

Title for the King of Manipur

Ningthou was a title used for the King of Manipur. The Ningthou was used to refer to the King after the reign of Pakhangba and was a title used until King Pamheiba. The subsequent Sanskritization undertaken by Pamheiba and Shantidas Adhikari changed the title of the King to Maharaja or Raja though the native name was still used for some Kings (ex. Ningthou Ching-Thang Khomba). Leima was Also a title used for the Queen of Manipur.

== See also ==
- List of Meitei royals
- Manipur (princely state)
