= Nara Singh =

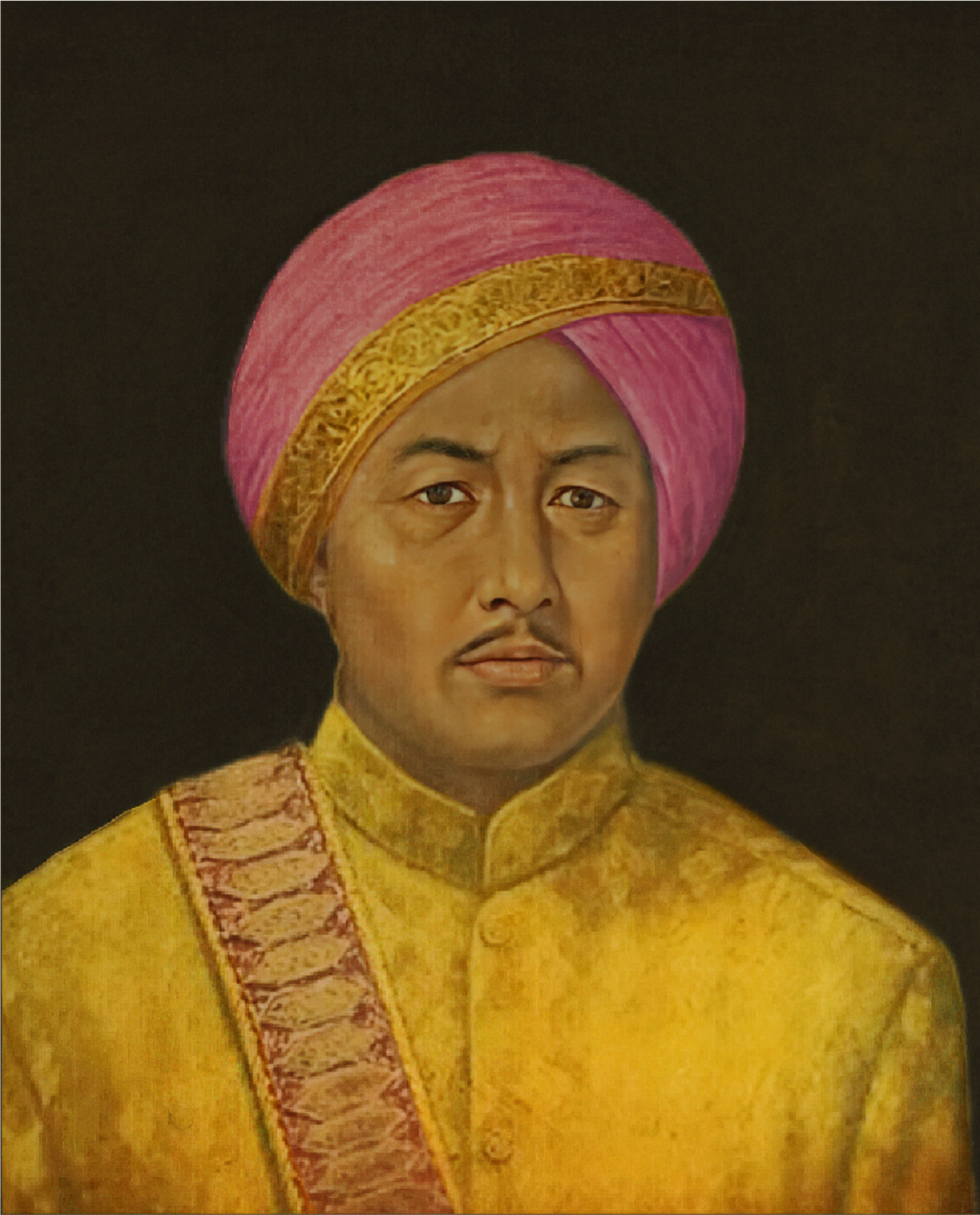
- Maharaja

King of Manipur
- Reign: 8 February 1844 – 11 April 1850
- Coronation: 22 November 1844
- Predecessor: Chandrakirti Singh
- Successor: Debindro Singh
- Regent: 9 January 1834 – 8 February 1844
- Born: 1792; Sagolband Maputhou Mantri Leikai, Imphal
- Died: 11 April 1850; Kangla Palace, Imphal
- Spouse: Maharani Daseshori, Wahengbam Chanu Rashmi, Haikrujam Malika, Achom Khemeshori, Nongmaithem Chandrabala, Maibam Dhanapati, Wangambam Neleshori and others
- Issue: Bhubon Singh, Natendra, Angou Senapati, Haochao, Sana Barachaoba, Panganton, Puskar, Sana Uriba, Sana Megajing, ThebaIrendra, Ningtek Sana, Princess Yumshangbi, Princess Chaonu, Princess nongthonbi, Princess Thokchom Ongbi, Princess Konusana, Princess Wangol sana, Princess Chaobiton, Princess Chaobiton and others
Names
- Meetingu Lairen Nonglen Sendreng Manik Khomba
- House: Ningthouja
- Father: Maharaja Badra Singh
- Mother: Queen Loitongbam Chanu Premlata

Nara Singh (1792 – 11 April 1850) also known as Chingthanglen Pamheiba and Meetingu Lairen Nonglen Sendreng Manik Khomba, was a ruler of the Kingdom of Manipur. He ruled first as regent from 1834 to 1844 and then as king for a period of six years from 1844 to 1850. His subjects called him ‘Eningthou Nungsiba’ or ‘our beloved king’.

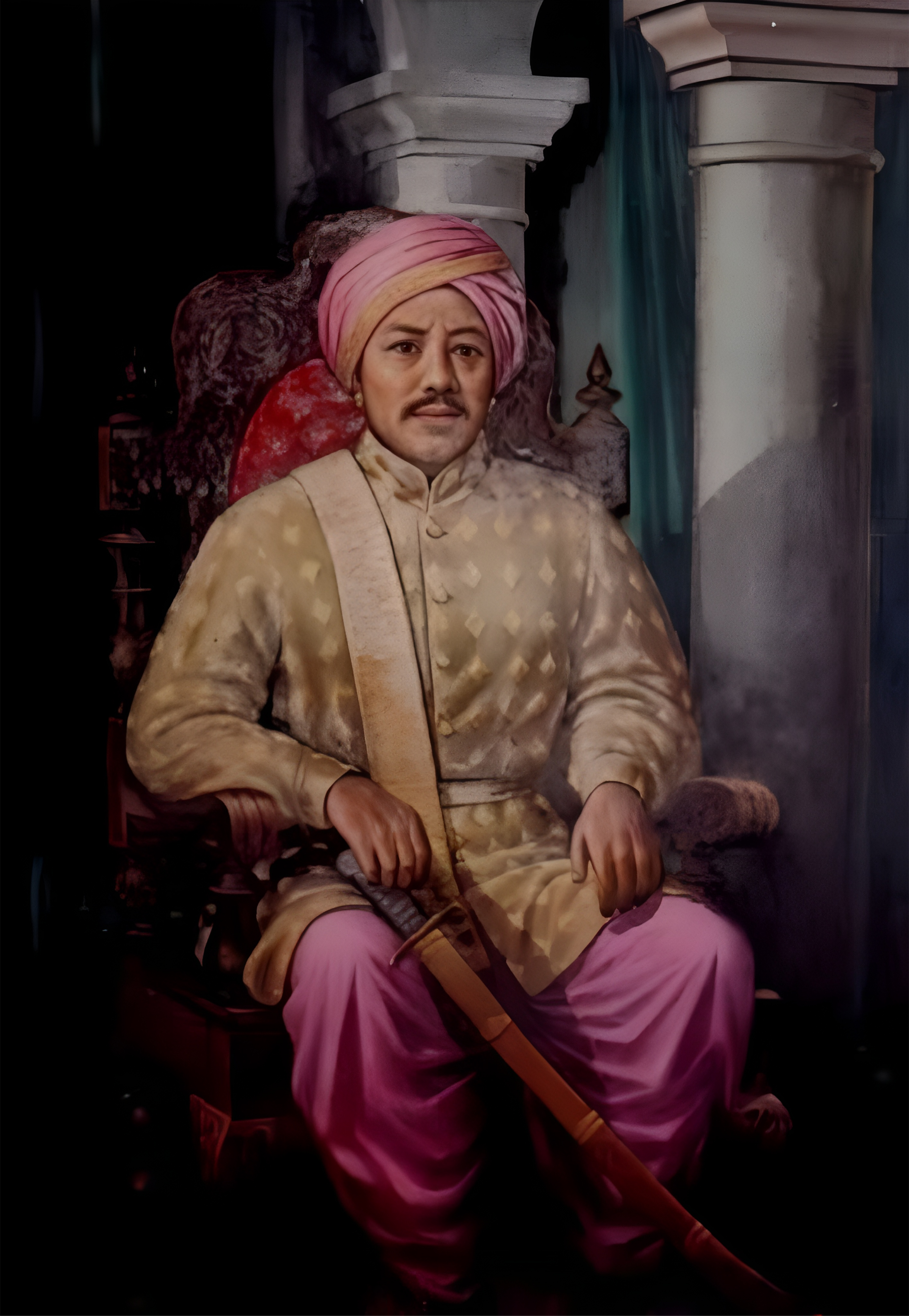

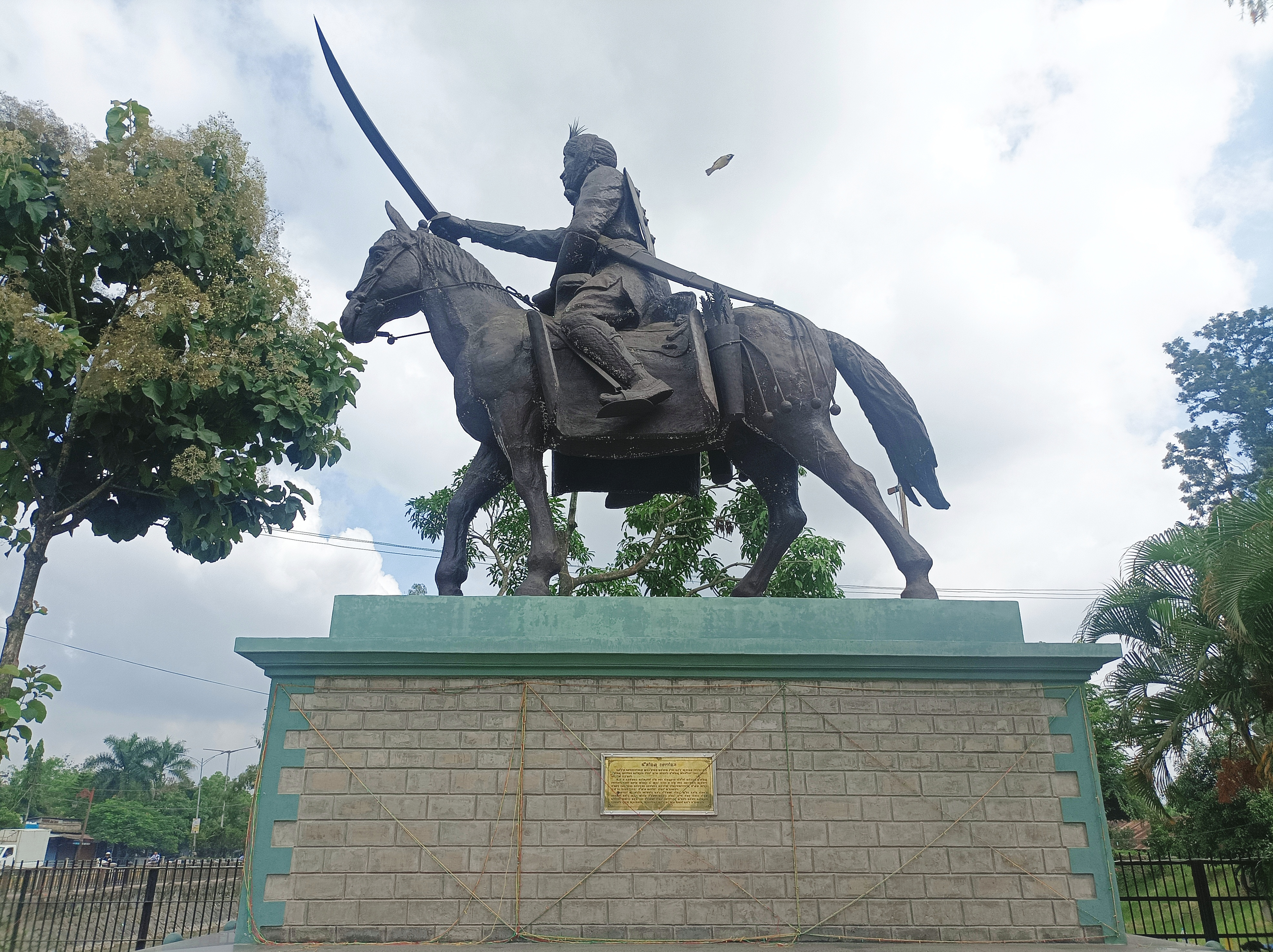
Bronze statue of Maharaja Nara Singh in front of the Western Entrance Gate to the Kangla Fort in Imphal

== Early life ==
Nara Singh was a great-grandson of King Gharib Niwaz, born to the Badra Singh (r. April 1825 – June 1825 ) and Loitongbam Chanu Premlata. Cheitharol Kumbaba recorded that his father Badra Singh held several posts including that of Yaiskul Lakpa (minister) during the reign of Bhagyachandra (r. 1763–1799). In 1796. he was exiled to Cachar owing to involvement in a conspiracy against the king. During the Burmese occupation of Manipur, Badra Singh's son Jadu Singh (r. 1823), grandson Raghov Singh (r. 1823–24) and Badra Singh himself (r. 1825) served as puppet rulers of the occupying power. Nara Singh was however not involved in the scramble for throne. He remained in Cachar, and supported the cause of his second cousin Gambhir Singh in negotiating with the British for the liberation of Manipur.

== Liberation of Manipur ==
Nara Singh served as the commanding officer of the Manipur Levy, raised by Gambhir Singh with British assistance. He was paid an allowance of Rs. 100 per month from the British during the First Anglo-Burmese War (1824–1826). He showed his military skill and courage in the war of liberation. The Manipur Levy liberated Manipur in June 1825. The last battle of the war of independence was fought at Tamu in December and January 1826. Nara Singh played a vital role in saving the Meitei by inflicting a crushing defeat on the Burmese armies and driving them beyond the historic Ningthi river. By the Treaty of Yandabo (1826) signed at the conclusion of the war, Gambhir Singh was recognised as the independent ruler of Manipur. Nara Singh became his senapati (General).

== As the general of Manipur ==
During the reign of his second cousin Gambhir Singh (r. 1826–1834 CE) Nara Singh served as the senapati (general) of Manipur army. He conducted around five military expeditions into the hills of Manipur to subjugate the rebellious chieftains. In December 1826, he successfully conducted military expedition against "Thonglang hao"; in February 1827, he led an expedition into "Khaki hao"; in October 1828, he conducted an expedition to Kongchai and in April 1831, he again attacked "Khaki hao" in which twenty villages were abandoned.

== As the regent of Manipur ==
Gambhir Singh having sat on the throne for about eight years made up his mind to make a pilgrimage to Vrindavana after entrusting the state and his little son, Chadrakirti, to Nara Singh. When all preparations were over, the king's ailing health suddenly took a turn for the worse and soon he died on 9 January 1834. Turning down the offer of the throne to him by the people, Nara Singh made Chandra Kirti, the young prince, only four years old then, king with himself as regent. The whole reign of the minor king Chandrakirti, also known as Ningthem Pisak, witnessed a large number of rebellions. He successfully quelled the palace revolts of Prince Tarang Khomba (May 1836), Prince Jogendrajit Singh (June 1835), Prince Tribubanjit Singh (April–May 1841), Prince Karaba (May 1841), Prince Chiba (May 1841), Prince Parbitan Singh, Prince Norendrajit Singh and Prince Nilambar Singh (September 1841). During the reign of the boy king Chandra Kirti, Nara Singh conducted military expeditions against Phumnung Hao ( September 1835), Awang Hao (February 1836), Khaki Hao (April 1836), Koirek (December 1838), Awang Hao (September 1839), Nungbi and Nunghar ( October 1839), Khongchai ( October 1840), Khaki Hao and Kolek Hao (February–March 1842), Ngamei (January–February 1843) and Khaki Hao (April 1843).

== Queen-Mother Maisnam Kumudini's conspiracy ==
Nara Singh looked after the administration of Manipur as the Regent with efficiency and care for the welfare of the people. He was popular during the lifetime of Gambhir Singh. And during his 10-year regency, he got the appreciation of his subjects. He became more popular. Popularity of Nara Singh created a fear and jealousy in the mind of Dowager queen, Maharani Kumudini, the mother of the boy king Chandra Kirti. This ultimately led to the plot for the assassination of the Regent. Queen Kumudini sent Prince Nabin to assassinate him. The plot failed. In consequence of the failure of her plot, Kumudini and her son Chandra Kirti fled to Cachar.

== As the king of Manipur ==
On the abdication of Chandra Kirti in 1844 Nara Singh ascended the throne on the request of his subjects to save the kingdom from chaos and anarchy. According to the Cheitharol Kumbaba Nara Singh ascended the throne on 8 February 1844 at the age of fifty-two. His installation ceremony was performed on 22 November 1844. One of the first acts of Nara Singh as the king was to shift the capital from Langthabal to Imphal.

== Death ==
After a short reign of six years Maharaja Nara Singh died at the Kangla Palace on 11 April 1850. Every year his death anniversary is observed as National Dedication Celebration Day in Manipur. The Government of Manipur has made the day as restricted holiday in the state since 2001.

== See also ==
- List of Manipuri kings
- Liberation of Manipur

Preceded by Chinglen Nongdrenkhomba (Ganavira Singh)	King of Manipur; 1844–1850	Succeeded by Devendra Singh
