= Manipur (princely state) =

1110–1949 kingdom in South Asia, now Manipur state, India

Coordinates: 24°49′N 93°57′E

Manipur Kingdom Meckley Meitei: Meetei Leipak
- 1110–1949
- Coat of arms

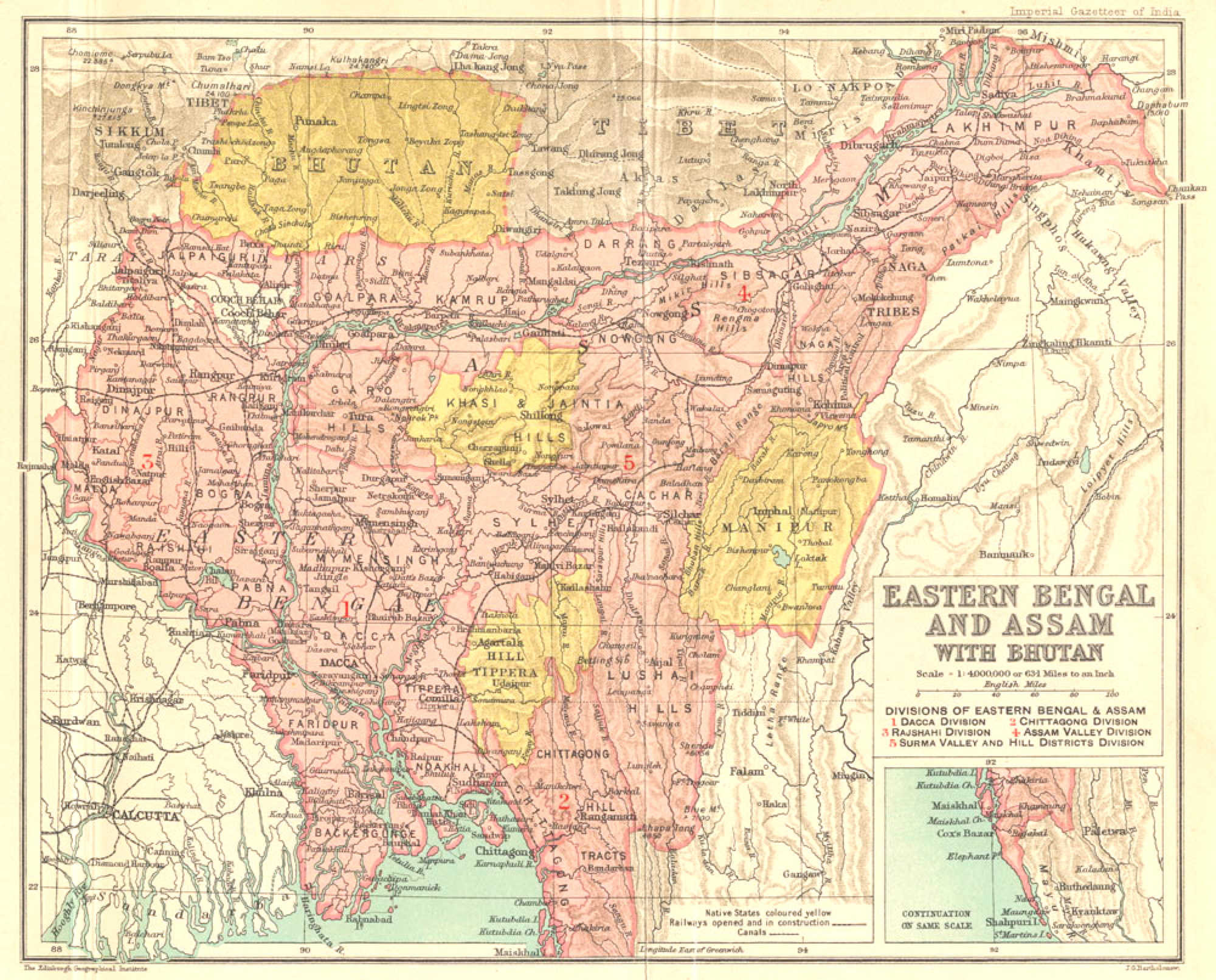
- Manipur State in the Hicky's Bengal Gazette of 1907
- Capital: Imphal
- Recognised national languages: Meitei language (officially known as Manipuri)
- Religion: Sanamahism; Later: Vaishnavite Hinduism
- History
  - Foundation of the Kangleipak Kingdom: 1110
  - Protectorate of British Empire: 1824
  - Princely state of India: 1891
  - Accession to the Indian Union: 1947
  - Merged into the Indian Union: 1949

Area
- 1941: 22,372 km^{2} (8,638 sq mi)

Population
  - 1941: 512,069
Preceded by	Succeeded by
Early Seven Clan State	Manipur; Kabaw Valley
- Today part of: India; Myanmar

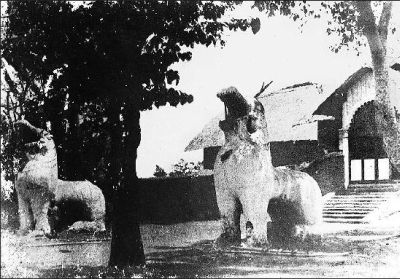
Kangla Uttra Sanglen at the Kangla Fort, former residence of the Meitei kings of Manipur. The two statues of Kangla Sha (Meitei dragon lions) standing in front of the inner gate were destroyed after the Anglo-Manipur War of 1891 but have been restored by the Manipur Government in recent years.

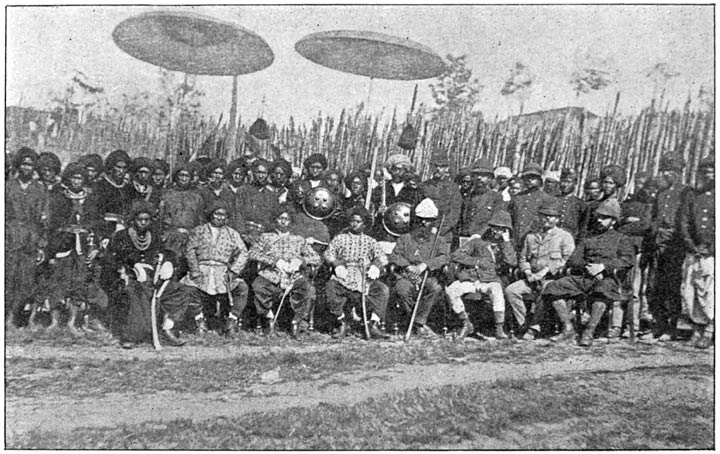
The princes of Manipur, Col. Johnstone, Thangal Major and the European officer in Kohima after relieving the fort from the siege of the Nagas, 1880

The Kohima Stone Inscription erected by Meitei King Gambhir Singh (Meitei: Chinglen Nongdrenkhomba), the Maharaja of Manipur, as the testimony of Meitei presence in the Naga Hills.

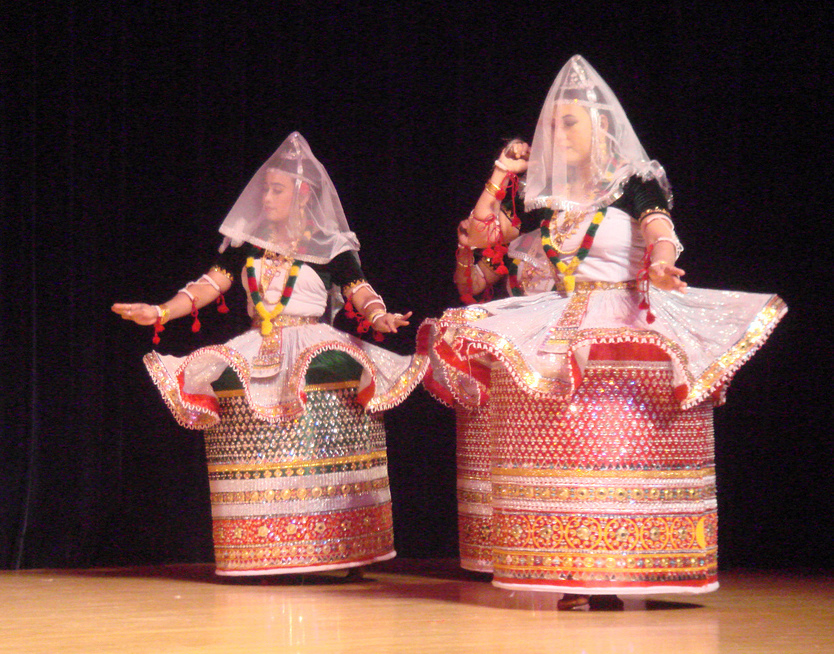
The Manipuri classical dance was developed by Meitei King Rajarshi Bhagyachandra (Meitei: Ching-Thang Khomba), the Maharajah of Manipur.

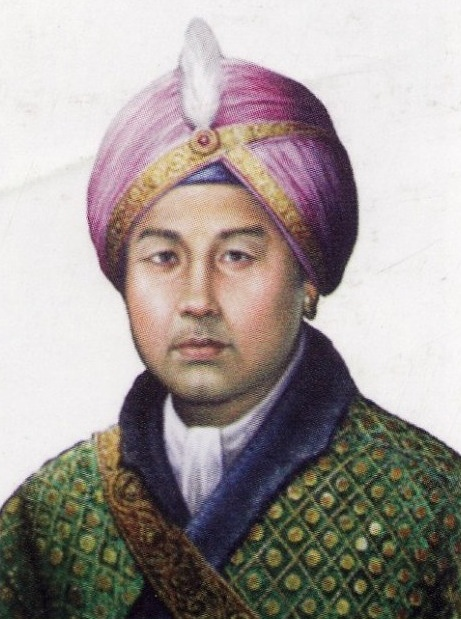
Raja Gambhir Singh (1788–1834) accepted British suzerainty to retrieve the kingdom from Burmese occupation

The Manipur Kingdom, also known as Meckley, was an ancient kingdom at the India–Burma frontier. Historically, Manipur was an independent kingdom ruled by the Meitei dynasty. But it was also invaded and ruled over by Burmese kingdom at various points in time. It became a protectorate of the British East India Company from 1824, and a princely state of the British Raj in 1891. The princely state bordered the Assam Province in the west and British Burma in the east, and in the 20th century covered an area of 22,327 square kilometres (8,621 sq mi) and contained 467 villages. The capital of the state was Imphal.

== Kangleipak State ==
The early history of Manipur is composed of mythical narratives. The location of the Kangla Fort on the banks of the Imphal River is believed to be where King Pakhangba built his first palace.

Loyumba Shinyen, the written constitution of Kangleipak was formally developed by King Loiyumba (1074–1121) in 1110 AD. He consolidated the kingdom by incorporating most of the principalities in the surrounding hills. After subjugating all the villages within their valley, Kangleipak kings grew in power and began a policy of expansion beyond their territory. In 1443 King Ningthoukhomba raided Akla (present day Tamu, Myanmar), an area ruled by Shan people, initiating a policy of Manipuri claims to the neighbouring Kabaw Valley. The zenith of the Kangleipak State was reached under the rule of King Khagemba (1597–1652). Khagemba's brother Prince Shalungba was not happy about Khagemba's rule so he fled to Taraf where he allied with the local Bengali Muslim leaders. With a contingent of Bengali Muslim soldiers led by Muhammad Sani, Shalungba then attempted to invade Manipur but the soldiers were captured and made to work as labourers in Manipur. These soldiers married local Meitei women and adapted to the Meitei language. They introduced hookah to Manipur and founded the Meitei Pangals (Manipuri Muslim community). It is claimed that Manipur learned the art of making gunpowder from the Chinese merchants who visited the state around 1630 and had started making rockets named Meikappi by the early 18th century.

== Manipur State ==
In 1714, King Pamheiba was initiated into Gaudiya Vaishnavism by Shantidas Gosai, a Bengali Hindu from Sylhet. He made the Gaudiya Vaishnava faith the state religion, replacing Meitei religion, made the Meitei language (aka Manipuri language) written in Bengali script, destroying many documents of Meitei language written in Meitei script and changed his name to Garib Niwaj. In 1724, the Sanskrit name Manipur (transl. the City of Jewels) was adopted as the name of the state, to make the realm eponymous with Manipura of the Mahabharata. King Garib Niwaj made several incursions into Burma, but made no permanent conquest. After the death of Gharib Nawaz in 1751, Manipur was occupied by the Kingdom of Burma and the Meitei king Bhagyachandra (Meitei: Ching-Thang Khomba) sought help from the British, but when the British refused help he went to Ahom King Rajeswar Singha who sent a force of 40,000 under Haranath Senapati Phukan to free Manipur. A treaty of alliance was negotiated in 1762 and a military force was sent to assist Manipur. The force was later recalled and then the state was left to its own devices. Manipur was invaded at the onset of the First Anglo-Burmese War, together with Cachar and Assam.

== British protectorate ==
Following the Burmese occupation of Manipur and of Assam, in 1824, the British declared war on Burma, which came to be known as the First Anglo-Burmese War. The exiled Manipur prince Gambhir Singh sought British help for raising a force and the request was granted. Sepoys and artillery were sent and British officers trained a levy of Manipuri troops for the battles that ensued. With British help, Gambhir Singh succeeded in expulsion of Burmese from Manipur, after receiving additional reinforcement, he expelled the Burmese from Kabaw Valley by 1826 as well, and Gambhir Singh became the king of Manipur, after the war the Treaty of Yandabo was signed. According to the British political agent McCulloch, by the treaty of Yandabo, Manipur was declared independent but being too weak by itself to remain so, and its position being in a military point of view, of too much importance to permit the chance of the Burmese obtaining the command of it, the British government has been compelled to guard against such a chance and to retain in the country a political agent, all border disputes having been settled by this officer. However, the Burmese did not agree to the cession of Kabaw Valley. After prolonged negotiations, the British agreed to return Kabaw Valley to Burma, on the ground that Marjit Singh had already ceded it earlier. Some Manipuri scholars regard this as a lease to Burma. as the British paid a compensation of 500 Sicca Rupees per month. After these developments, Manipur is deemed to have become a British protectorate, even though its ensuing status is debated till this day.

At the death of Gambhir Singh, his son Chandrakirti Singh was only one year old, and his uncle Nara Singh was appointed as regent. That same year the British decided to restore the Kabaw Valley to the Kingdom of Burma, which had never been happy about the loss. A compensation was paid to Raja of Manipur in the form of an annual allowance of Rs 6,370 and a British residency was established in Imphal, the only town of the state, in 1835 to facilitate communication between the British and the rulers of Manipur.

After a thwarted attempt on his life, Nara Singh took power and held the throne until his death in 1850. His brother Devendra Singh was given the title of Raja by the British, but he was unpopular. After only three months, the rightful heir Chandrakirti Singh invaded Manipur and rose to the throne. Numerous members of the royal family tried to overthrow Chandrakirti Singh, but none of the rebellions was successful. In 1879, when British Deputy Commissioner G.H. Damant was killed by an Angami Naga party, the king of Manipur assisted the British by sending troops to neighbouring Kohima. Following this service to the crown, Chandrakirti Singh was rewarded with the Order of the Star of India.

After Maharaja Chandrakriti's death in 1886 his son Surachandra Singh succeeded him. As in previous occasions, several claimants to the throne tried to overthrow the new king. The first three attempts were defeated, but in 1890, following an attack on the palace by Tikendrajit and Kulachandra Singh, two of the king's brothers, Surachandra Singh announced his intention to abdicate and left Manipur for Cachar. Kulachandra Singh then rose to the throne while Tikendrajit Singh, as the commander of the Manipuri armed forces, held the real power behind the scenes. Meanwhile, Surachandra Singh, after leaving Manipur, appealed to the British for help to recover the throne.

=== The 'Manipur Expedition' ===
The British decided to recognise Kulachandra Singh as Raja, and to send a military expedition of 400 men to Manipur to punish Senapati Tikendrajit Singh as the main person responsible for the unrest and the dynastic disturbances. This action and the violent events that followed are known in British annals as the 'Manipur Expedition, 1891', while in Manipur they are known as the 'Anglo-Manipur War of 1891'.

The British attempt to remove Tikendrajit from his position as military commander (Senapati) and arrest him on 24 March 1891 caused a great stir. The British Residency in Imphal was attacked and the Chief Commissioner for Assam J.W. Quinton, Col. Sken, the British Resident and other British officials were murdered. In the middle of the unrest Ethel St Clair Grimwood, the widow of Frank St Clair Grimmond, the killed British Resident, was credited with leading a retreat of surviving sepoys out of Manipur to Cachar. She was later lauded as a hero. A 5,000 strong punitive expedition was sent against Manipur on 27 April 1891. Three British columns entered Manipur from British Burma, Cachar and the Naga Hills, which after several skirmishes with the 3,000 men strong Manipuri army, managed to pacify the kingdom. Following the British attack, Tikendrajit and Kulachandra Singh fled, but were captured. Tikendrajit and those Manipuris involved in the killing of the British officers were tried and hanged, while the deposed King Kulachandra Singh and other leaders of the rebellion were sent to the Cellular Jail in the Andaman Islands. Manipur was briefly annexed to British India by virtue of the doctrine of lapse. On 22 September 1891 when Meidingngu Churachand (Churachandra), a 5-year-old boy, was put on the throne, power was restored nominally to the Manipuri crown over the state. During the dynastic disturbances and the British intervention the Naga and Kuki hill tribes of the state lapsed into lawlessness, with numerous instances of murder and arson in the mountain villages, a situation that lasted well into 1894.

== Princely state under British Raj ==
The child ruler Churachand belonged to a side branch of the Manipur royal family, so that all the main contenders to the throne were bypassed. While he was a minor the affairs of state were administered by the British Political Agent, which facilitated the introduction and implementation of reforms. The first paved road to Manipur was inaugurated in 1900 —until then there had been no proper roads to reach the kingdom— and this improvement in communication facilitated a visit by Viceroy Lord Curzon in 1901. Raja Churachand was formally declared king in 1907 after completing education in Ajmer. In 1918 he was given the privilege to use the title 'Maharaja' and during his reign Manipur enjoyed a period of relative peace and prosperity. In 1934 king Churachand was knighted by the British, becoming Sir Churachandra Singh.

Between March 1944 and July 1944 part of Manipur and the Naga Hills District of Assam Province were occupied by the Imperial Japanese Army. The capital Imphal was shelled on 10 May 1944.

== Twilight and end of the princely state ==
On 14 August 1947, with the lapse of paramountcy of the British Crown, Manipur regained its political autonomy that it had prior to 1891. (Note: Some Manipur scholars tend to label this political autonomy as "independence".) The Maharaja had signed the Instrument of Accession on 11 August 1947, which legality is argued by many, ceding the three subjects of defence, external affairs and communications to the Union of India, while retaining internal political autonomy. A 'Manipur State Constitution Act 1947' was enacted, giving the state its own constitution, although this did not become known in other parts of India owing to the relative isolation of the kingdom. The Government of India did not recognize the Constitution.

On 21 September 1949, the Maharaja was coerced to sign a Manipur Merger Agreement with the Union of India, to take effect on 15 October the same year, which legality is also disputed by many As a result of the agreement, the Manipur State merged into the Indian Union as a Part C State (similar to a Chief Commissioner's Province under the colonial regime or a Union Territory in the present Indian structure), to be governed by a Chief Commissioner appointed by the Government of India. The representative assembly of Manipur was abolished.

Unhappy with the central rule, Rishang Keishing began a movement for representative government in Manipur in 1954. The Indian home minister, however, declared that the time was not yet ripe for the creation of representative assemblies in Part C States such as Manipur and Tripura, stating that they were located in strategic border areas of India, that the people were politically backward and that the administration in those states was still weak. However, it was given a substantial measure of local self-government under the Territorial Councils Act of 1956, a legislative body and council of ministers in 1963, and full statehood in 1972.

== Rulers ==
The rulers of Manipur state were entitled to an 11-gun salute by the British authorities. The present dynasty began in 1714.

- 1709–1754 Gharib Nawaz (Pamheiba) (d. 1754)
- 1754–1756 Bharat Shah (Chitsai)
- 1756–1764 Guru Sham (Gaurisiam) (d. 1764)
- 1764–1798 Jai Singh (Bhagya Chandra)
- 1798–1801 Rohinchandra (Harshachandra Singh) (d. 1801)
- 1801–1806 Maduchandra Singh (d. 1806)
- 1806–1812 Charajit Singh (d. 1812)
- 1812–1819 Marjit Singh (d. 1824)

=== Rajas under Burmese rule ===
There were two feudatory kings during the time of the Burmese invasions.

- 1819–1823 Shubol
- 1823–1825 Pitambara Singh

=== Rajas under British protection ===
- 26 Jun 1825 – 9 January 1834 Gambhir Singh (d. 1834)
- 1834–1844 Nara Singh – Regent (d. 1850)
- 1844 – 10 April 1850 Nara Singh (s.a.)
- 1850 (3 months) Devendra Singh (d. 1871)
- 1850 – May 1886 Chandrakirti Singh (s.a.) (b. 1831 – d. 1886) (from 18 February 1880, Sir Chandrakirti Singh)
- 1886 – 24 September 1890 Surachandra Singh (d. 1891)
- 24 Sep 1890 – 19 April 1891 Kulachandra Singh (b. 18.. – d. 1934)

=== Rulers of the princely state under British Raj ===
- 19 Apr 1891 – 18 September 1891 Interregnum
- 18 Sep 1891 – September 1941 Churachandra Singh (b. 1885 – d. 1941, titled "Maharaja" in 1918, knighted 1934)
- Sep 1941 – 15 October 1949 Bodhchandra Singh (b. 1909 – d. 1955)

=== British Political Agents ===
The Political agents were subordinated to the Chief Commissioner of Assam (Lieutenant Governor of East Bengal and Assam during 1905–1912)

- 1835–1844 George Gordon
- 1844–1863 William McCulloch (1st time) (Note: William MuCulloch authored Account of the Valley of Munnipore and of the Hill Tribes (1859).)
- 1863–1865 Dillon
- 1865–1867 William McCulloch (2nd time) (s.a.)
- 1867–1875 Robert Brown (Note: Robert Brown authored Statistical Account of the Native State of Manipur and the Hill Territory under Its Rule (1874).)
- 1875–1877 Guybon Henry Damant (acting)
- 1877–1886 James Johnstone (Note: James Johnstone authored My Experiences in Manipur and the Naga Hills (1896).)
- 1886 (6 weeks) Trotter (acting)
- 25 Mar 1886 – 21 April 1886 Walter Haiks (acting)
- 1886 – 24 April 1891 St. Clair Grimwood (d. 1891)
- 1891 Sir Henry Collett (British commander)
- 1891–1893 H.St.P. John Maxwell (1st time)
- 1893–1895 Alexander Porteous (1st time)
- 1895–1896 H.St.P. John Maxwell (2nd time)
- 1896–1898 Henry Walter George Cole (1st time) (acting)
- 1898–1899 Alexander Porteous (2nd time)
- 1899–1902 H.St.P. John Maxwell (3rd time)
- 1902–1904 Albert Edward Woods
- 1904–1905 H.St.P. John Maxwell (4th time)
- 1905–1908 John Shakespear (1st time) (Note: John Shakespear authored The Lushei Kuki Clans (1912).)
- 1908–1909 A.W. Davis
- 1909–1914 John Shakespear (2nd time)
- 1914–1917 Henry Walter George Cole (2nd time) (s.a.)
- 1917–1918 John Comyn Higgins (1st time)
- 1918–1920 William Alexander Cosgrave
- 1920–1922 L.O. Clarke (1st time)
- 1922 Christopher Gimson (1st time) (acting)
- 1922–1924 L.O. Clarke (2nd time)
- 1924–1928 John Comyn Higgins (2nd time) (s.a.)
- 12 Mar 1928 – 23 November 1928 C.G. Crawford
- 1928–1933 John Comyn Higgins (3rd time) (s.a.)
- 1933–1938 Christopher Gimson (2nd time) (s.a.)
- 1938–1941 Gerald Pakenham Stewart (1st time) (Japanese prisoner 1941–45)
- 1941–1946 Christopher Gimson (3rd time) (s.a.)
- Dec 1946 – 14 August 1947 Gerald Pakenham Stewart (2nd time)

=== British administrators ===
During the princely state stage (1891–1947), an Indian Civil Service (ICS) officer of the East Bengal and Assam cadre was appointed as the administrator, first as the vice-president of the Manipur State Darbar, and, from 1916, as its president.

- May 1907 – 1910 William Alexander Cosgrave
- April–June 1910 C. H. Bell
- June 1910 – 1917 John Comyn Higgins
- 1917–1918 Robert Herriot Henderson (1st time)
- 1918 – July 1918 V. Woods
- 1918–1919 Sir Robert Herriot Henderson (s.a., 2nd time)
- 1919–1921 Christopher Gimson
- 1921 – June 1921 William Shaw
- June 1921 – September 1922 Charles Seymour Mullan
- September 1922 – June 1927 Colin Grant Crawford
- June 1925 – February 1926 Hugh Weightman (acting)
- June 1927 – 1930 Anthony Gilchrist McCall
- 1930 – February 1933 Cecil Walter Lewery Harvey
- February 1933 – February 1936 Gerald Pakenham Stewart
- March 1936 – February 1937 Crispin Bernard Chitty Paine
- February 1937 – 1939 Alexander Ranald Hume MacDonald
- July 1939 – 1943 Thomas Arthur Timothy Sharpe
- May 1943 – November 1945 Edward Francis Lydall
- November 1945 – 14 August 1947 Francis Fenwick Pearson (designated Chief Minister from 15 July 1947)

=== Indian administration ===
Political agents

The Indian Agents were subordinated to the Governor of Assam.

- 15 August 1947 – 1947 Gerald Pakenham Stewart (s.a.)
- 1947–1948 Debeswar Sharma

Dewans

The Dewans were representing the Governor of Assam.

- 1948 – 16 April 1949 M. K. Priyobrata Singh (s.a.)
- 16 April 1949 – 15 October 1949 Rawal Amar Singh

== Flags ==
The State of Manipur had a set of two flags, a white one and a red one. All featured the Pakhangba dragon in the centre, although not as prominently in the latter flags.

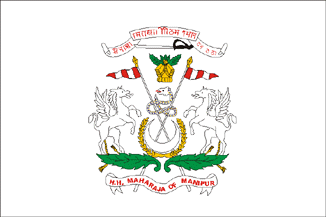
White flag with coat of arms (1907–1949)

Red flag with Pakhangba (till 1907)

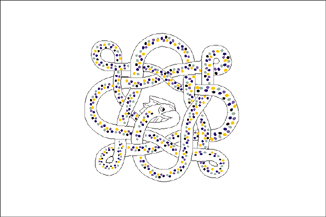
White flag with Pakhangba (till 1907)

== See also ==
- History of Manipur
- Manipur State Constitution Act 1947
- Meitei inscriptions
- Ningthouja dynasty
- Meitei mythology
- Political integration of India

== Bibliography ==
- Furber, Holden (1951), "The Unification of India, 1947–1951", Pacific Affairs, 24 (4), Pacific Affairs, University of British Columbia: 352–371, doi:10.2307/2753451, JSTOR 2753451
- Laichen, Sun (2003). "Military Technology Transfers from Ming China and the Emergence of Northern Mainland Southeast Asia (c. 1390–1527)". Journal of Southeast Asian Studies. 34 (3). Cambridge University Press: 495–517. doi:10.1017/S0022463403000456. JSTOR 20072535. S2CID 162422482.
- Agnihotri, S. K. (1996), "Constitutional Development in North-East India since 1947", in B. Datta-Ray; S. P. Agrawal (eds.), Reorganization of North-East India Since 1947, Concept Publishing Company, pp. 57–92, ISBN 978-81-7022-577-5
- Sanatomba, Kangujam (2015), "Interrogation into the political status of Manipur", in Arambam Noni; Kangujam Sanatomba (eds.), Colonialism and Resistance: Society and State in Manipur, Routledge, pp. 159–180, ISBN 978-1-317-27066-9
- Sen, Sipra (1992), Tribes and Castes of Manipur: Description and Select Bibliography, Mittal Publications, ISBN 81-7099-310-5
- Singh, Karam Manimohan (1991), History of the Christian Missions in Manipur and Neighbouring States, Mittal Publications, ISBN 81-7099-285-0 – via archive.org
- Sudhirkumar Singh, Haorongbam (2011). Socio-religious and Political Movements in Modern Manipur 1934–51. INFLIBNET (PhD thesis). Jawaharlal Nehru University. hdl:10603/121665 – via Shodhganga.
- Thokchom, Veewon (2022). Princely State of Manipur: Durbar, the Raj and Resistances, C. 1900–1950 (PDF) (M. Phil. thesis). Aizwal: Department of History & Ethnography, Mizoram University.
