= Manipur State Congress =

Former political party in Manipur, India

- President: R. K. Bhubonsana Singh
- General Secretary: Yumnam Khoimacha
- Founded: 4 October 1946
- Dissolved: 1949; 77 years ago
- Preceded by: Nikhil Manipuri Mahasabha
- Merged into: Indian National Congress
- Ideology: responsible government
- Political position: centrist

Manipur State Congress was a political party in the princely state of Manipur around the time of Indian independence. It was influential in the Constitution-making Committee. It contested the election for the legislative assembly under the constitution in 1948, and emerged as the largest party in the assembly, but failed to win a majority. A newly formed royalist party formed the government and Congress sat in the opposition. Following the merger of Manipur into India in 1949, it merged into the Assam provincial unit of the Indian National Congress.

== Background ==
In 1934, Nikhil Manipuri Mahasabha (NMM) was established by Hijam Irabot with the-then Maharajah Churachand Singh as president. By 1938 it had become a prominent political front advocating the democratization of the powers held by the Darbar [Council] and an overhaul of the corrupt colonial administration. The organisation called for abolition of exploitative taxes, reunification of the hills with the valley, establishment of self-rule, installation of a Panchayat system, and the establishment of a unicameral legislature based on suffrage. Around the period of World War II, 1940–1946, Irabot was imprisoned and later externed from the state. In prison, he had met communist leaders and was influenced by them. After release, he took part in kisan movements (farmers' movements). During his absence, other leaders took control of the Nikhil Manipuri Mahasabha.

When Irabot returned to Manipur in 1946, according to commentators, the new leaders of NMM did not wish to relinquish control, and decided to marginalise Irabot. Their strategem was to accuse Irabot of collusion with the communists. In a letter written to Irabot in April, NMM made it clear that it sympathised with the Indian National Congress and that it was anti-communist. In a submission to the British Cabinet Mission, NMM is said to have proposed a 'united kingdom' for the whole of India with the central government controlling defence, finance, trade, communications, road and transport, taxes and foreign policy. In August 1946, NMM petitioned Maharaja Bodhchandra Singh for an immediate declaration of responsible government. The Maharaja appears to have been receptive to an extent.

In the meantime, Irabot had set up new organisations such as the Manipur Praja Mandal, Manipur Praja Sanmelani, Manipur Praja Sangha and Manipur Krishak Sabha. Through them, he promoted mass movements and competed with NMM.

=== Relations with Indian National Congress ===
Relations and strategies of Manipur parties with regard to Indian National Congress (INC) are subject to debate within Manipuri scholarship, with some scholars claiming that the Manipur State Congress was an integral part of the INC, others denying that it had any relation with it, and some others being ambivalent.

INC's policies towards the princely states are found by scholars to have been "ambiguous and negligent". The Haripura annual session in 1938 passed a resolution confirming the long-standing policy of non-involvement in the affairs of the princely states, but individual members were not barred from getting involved in their personal capacity. These involvements were via the All India States Peoples' Conference (AISPC), a conglomeration of peoples' movements in the princely states. It appears that both NMM and the Manipur State Congress after its formation, were members of the AISPC, and these links extended back to the days of Irabot's leadership. Jawaharlal Nehru, a key INC leader, was elected AISPC president in 1939 and remained in that position till 1946. In his January 1946 presidential address to AISPC (in Udaipur), Nehru stated his vision that about fifteen to twenty large states might enter the Indian federation as autonomous units with their rulers as constitutional heads while the other states would be absorbed into the neighbouring British Indian provinces. He was opposed to the formation of unions of princely states. (Note: These were evidently Nehru's remarks in his personal capacity, not official INC policy. As it happens, princely state unions were indeed formed after the independence of India.)

== Formation ==
The Manipur State Congress was formed on 4 October 1946, in a meeting convened at the Aryan Theatre in Imphal, with the agenda of bringing together all the political parties on a common platform so that pressure could be mounted on the Maharaja for responsible government. Irabot's parties, Manipur Krishak Sabha and Manipur Praja Sangha, were given one seat each on the governing committee, but Irabot himself was barred from being their representative on account of being a "communist". The accusation of Irabot created an ugly scene, with the result that Irabot and his colleagues left the meeting. The remaining organisations resolved to come together under the umbrella of Manipur State Congress. The president of the new party was R. K. Bhubonsana Singh and the general secretary was Yumnam Khoimacha. (Note: Bhubonsana Singh was formerly the president of Manipur Praja Sangha, which was a union of Manipur Praja Mandal and Manipur Praja Sanmelani, parties set up by Irabot himself.)

== Activities and fissures ==
In December 1946, the Maharaja declared the formation of a Constitution-Making Committee for the state. Manipur State Congress won all the five seats in the valley area for the Constitution-Making Committee. Irabot's parties boycotted the election, calling it undemocratic. The Constitution was formulated by July 1947, ahead of schedule.

Almost a whole year passed before the election for the legislative assembly were held under the new constitution. (Note: The reason for the delay is not adequately explained.) On 11 August 1947, the Maharaja acceded to the Indian Union and also signed a standstill agreement to continue the existing arrangements as present under the British rule. The British Political Agent was replaced by a 'Dominion Agent' of the Government of India, with Debeswar Sarmah, a high-ranking member of the Assam unit of INC, taking the place. The President of Manipur State Durbar was replaced by a chief minister, Maharaja's brother M. K. Priyobrata Singh being appointed to the post. He headed an Interim Council, two out of whose six members were drawn from the Manipur State Congress.

The formation of the Interim Council split the Manipur State Congress, with an opposing faction formed under the leadership of Elangbam Tompok Singh. (Note: Tompok Singh was a former member of the NMM.) It came to be called the 'Tompok Congress'. A faction under Tomal Singh (the 'Tomal Congress') supported the Interim Council as formed. It appeared that the Tompok Congress was integrationist, supporting measures for the integration of Manipur with India in some form.

Before the election, a new party called Praja Shanti came into being, widely believed to have been floated by the Maharaja and his Durbar elites. The party was pro-royalist and anti-Congress. When the election was held in June–July 1948, Manipur State Congress won 14 seats, but Praja Shanti was close behind with 12 seats. Praja Shanti was able to form the government with the support of Irabot's parties (6 seats) and the hill representatives, who were not affiliated to any of the valley parties (18 seats).

== Bibliography ==
- Chishti, S. M. A. W. (2005), Political Development in Manipur, 1919-1949, Gyan Publishing House, ISBN 978-81-7835-424-8
  - Chishti, S. M. A. W. (1979). Political Development in Manipur, 1919-1949 (PDF) (PhD thesis). Aligarh Muslim University.
- Indrakumar, Konthoujam (2015). "Colonialism and Movement for Democracy in Manipur". In Arambam Noni; Kangujam Sanatomba (eds.). Colonialism and Resistance: Society and State in Manipur. Routledge. pp. 61–69. doi:10.4324/9781315638317. ISBN 978-1-00-304589-2.
- McLeod, John (1999), Sovereignty, Power, Control: Politics in the States of Western India, 1916-1947, BRILL, ISBN 90-04-11343-6
- Parratt, John (2005), Wounded Land: Politics and Identity in Modern Manipur, Mittal Publications, ISBN 9788183240536
- Parratt, John; Parratt, Saroj Arambam (2000), "Hijam Irabot and the Radical Socialist Democratic Movement in Manipur", Internationales Asienforum, 31 (3–4): 275–288, archived from the original on 24 June 2021
- Meetei, A. Noni (2018), "Narrating the Nation in Manipur: Reproduction of a historical question", in Bhagat Oinam; Dhiren A. Sadokpam (eds.), Northeast India: A Reader, Routledge India, pp. 113–124, ISBN 978-0-429-95320-0, ISBN 978-0-429-48987-7 – via archive.org
- Ramusack, Barbara N. (1988), "Congress and the People's Movement in Princely India: Ambivalence in Strategy and Organization", in Richard Sisson; Stanley Wolpert (eds.), Congress and Indian Nationalism: The Pre-independence Phase, University of California Press, pp. 377–404, ISBN 978-0-520-06041-8
- Sudhirkumar Singh (2011). Socio-religious and Political Movements in Modern Manipur. Jawaharlal Nehru University. p. 120. hdl:10603/121665.
- Tarapot, Phanjoubam (2003), Bleeding Manipur, Har-Anand Publications, ISBN 978-81-241-0902-1
