= Fireflies (2018 Indian film) =

2018 Meitei film

- Directed by: Rajkumar Johnson
- Based on: the journey of the Meira Paibis (women social activists) to save the society, including the menfolk, from the crimes of the armed forces.
- Produced by: Film Division of India
- Cinematography: Andy Tourangbam
- Edited by: Akash Basumatar
- Music by: Jimbo Ningombam
- Layouts by: Sanjana Bhatt
- Production company: Film Division of India
- Release date: January 1, 2018
- Running time: 6 minutes
- Country: India
- Language: Meiteilon (Manipuri)

Fireflies is a 2018 Indian Meitei language documentary short film, directed by Johnson Rajkumar. It portrays the struggles of the Meira Paibis to protect the people from crimes in Manipur state, and the role of women in the conflicting and male-dominated society of Manipur. It looks at how the gender gap and gender identities are settled during times of conflict and violence in the society.

The film shows women reacting to the rising cases of disappearance of men. This took place after the Armed Forces Special Powers Act (AFSPA) was applied to Manipur state. The important point of the movie is that women stand up for the safety, security and better survival of the men.

== Plot ==
In 1980s, when Manipur was exposed to revolutionaries and armed violence, a group of women came out to the streets to uphold peace in the state. These groups were called the Meira Paibis. They were the freely independent women's organisations. They participated in the willing patrols during the night. They held the flaming torches and tried to bring balance in the society.

== Background ==
In India, women are mostly seen to be confined in their homes. In reality, they are the important members of every social movement. But they are always seen as not related. Women of Manipur contributed a lot towards the welfare of the social conditions. This really inspired Johnson Rajkumar, the maker of the "Fireflies".

He tried to show the influence of gender roles in conflicts and violence. If men were holding such responsibilities, they would have been falsely grouped into rebels. According to Johnson, the movie shows that women's collective has more to do beyond pro-feminists.

Rajkumar went to Bangalore for higher education. There, he realised that the issues from Manipur and the North East India were not truly represented or interpreted in the national media news. Hence, he created the "Fireflies" to fight the set false stories. He wanted to show the best formal true facts.

== Production ==
The film is financially supported by the "Samaj Pragati Sahayog", a social media platform based in Madhya Pradesh, India. Additionally, it is supported by the "Film Division of India".

Rajkumar is the director of the movie and a Manipuri media activist. He lives in Bangalore, Karnataka. He has been making documentary movies on social and political issues. He focuses on social movements and protests.

== Accolades and recognition ==
The film won many awards in international film festivals. These were held in different countries of the world.

=== Awards ===
Awards	Category	Results
Arthouse Asia International Film Festival, Kolkata (2018)	Best Short Documentary	Won
Chennai International Short Film Festival, Chennai (2018)	2nd place in Best Short Documentary	Won

== See also ==
- Women in Meitei culture
- Nupi Lan
- Ima Keithel
