= Meitei people in Tripura =

Tripura Meiteis (Meitei people in Tripura)
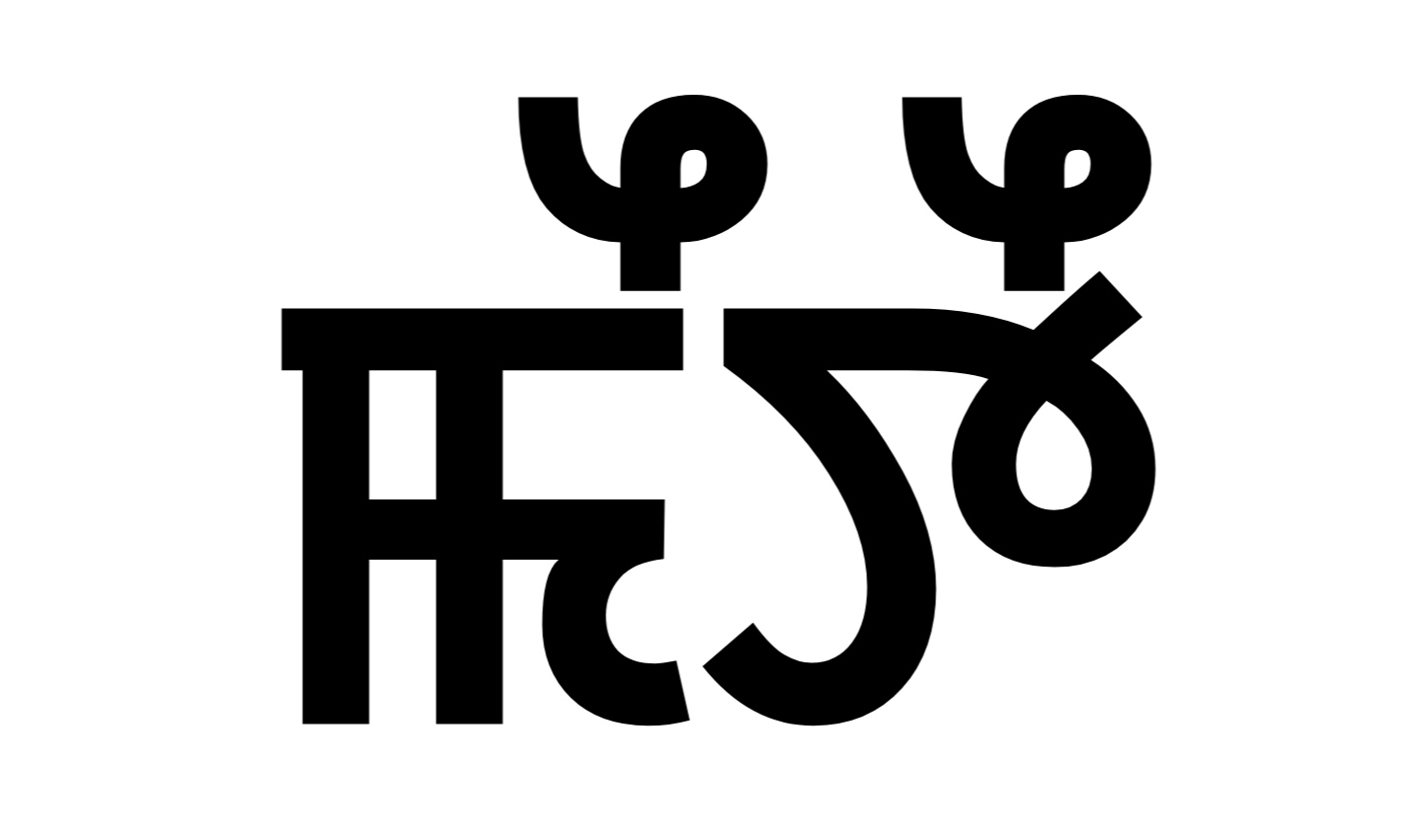

- Cultural flag of the Meiteis

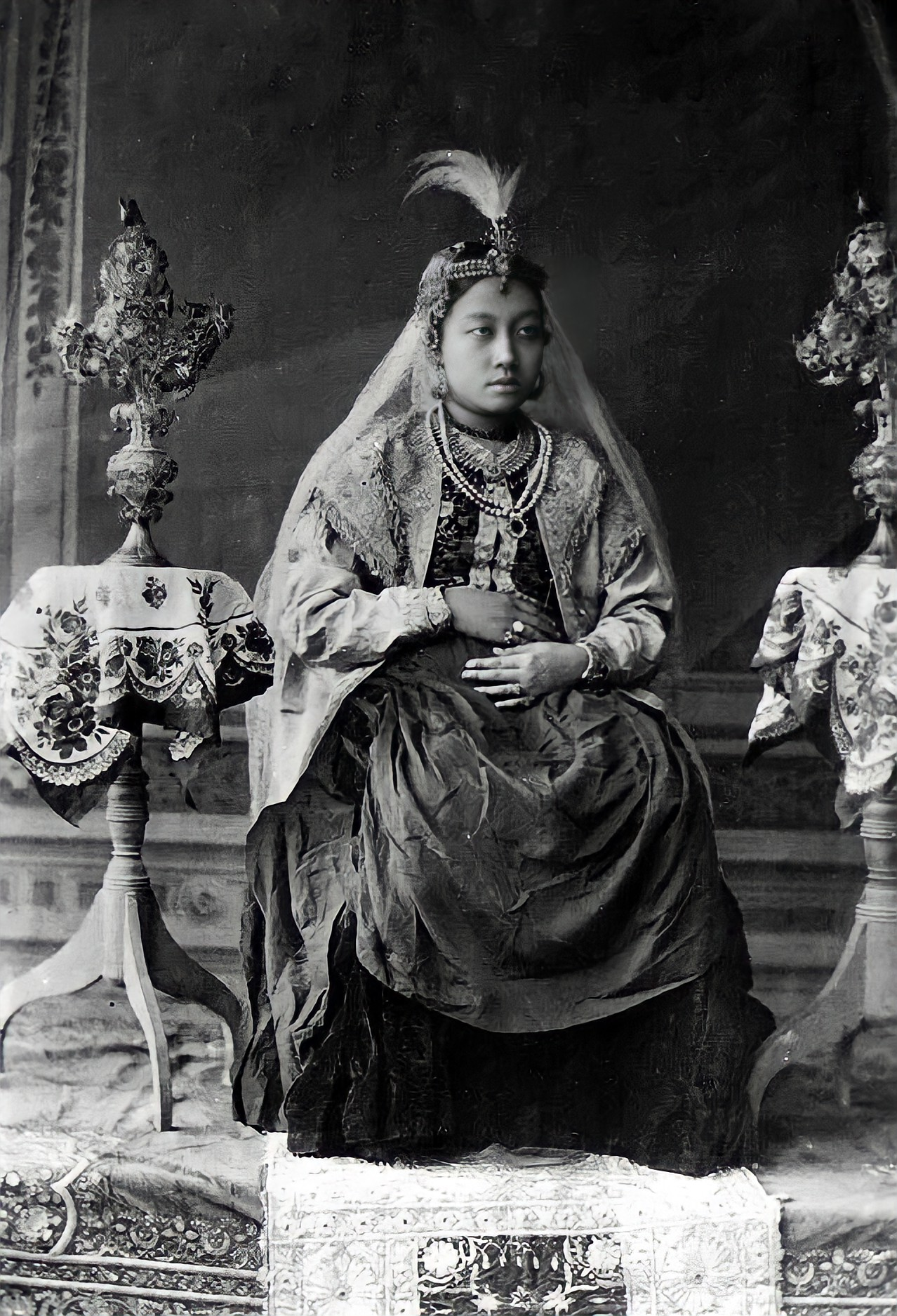
- Manmohini Devi, one of the Meitei queens of Tripura, and the first female self photographer of India

Total population
- 23,779 (2020)

Languages
- Meitei language (officially known as Manipuri language)

Religion
- Majority: Hinduism; Minority: Sanamahism, Islam

Related ethnic groups
- other Indian people

The Meitei people, also called Manipuri people, are one of the minority ethnic groups in Tripura. Meiteis call the land of Tripura as "Takhel" or "Takhen" in their language. In September 2020, their population was estimated to be approximately 23,779.

In Agartala, the capital of Tripura, the Meitei-speaking population is the fourth-largest linguistic group, after Bengalis, Tripuris, and Hindi speakers, according to the 2011 census.

The Tripura Meiteis are recognised under the OBC category in Tripura.

== History ==
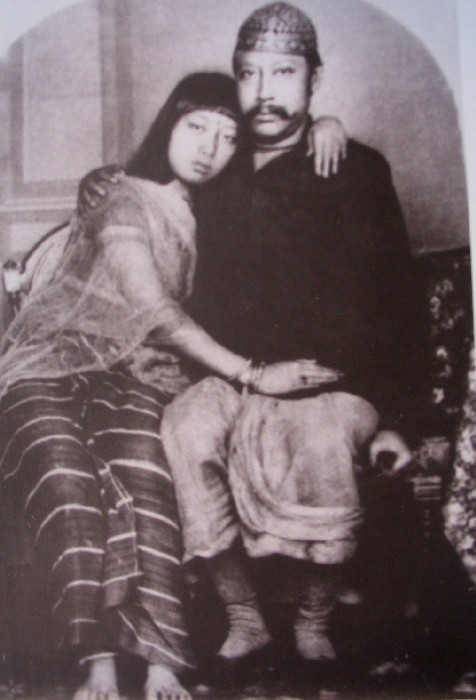
Khuman Chanu Manmohini Devi, one of the Meitei queens of Tripura, with her husband, Bir Chandra Manikya, the king of Tripura

There were royal matrimonial alliances between the royal houses of Tripura and Manipur during the days of monarchies. Numerous Meitei women became queens of the Twipra Kingdom. Kings of Tripura married not only Meitei princesses but also many Meitei girls from commoner families. Numerous Meitei queens of Tripura contributed to the public welfare works of the kingdoms. These frequent marriage alliances not only brought good relationships between the two kingdoms but also the cultural assimilation of Meitei culture with Tripuri culture. Besides the royalties, the tradition of marrying Meitei ladies was even practised by many nobles of Tripura. The Meitei subjects of these Meitei queens came from Manipur and settled in Tripura. These started the early settlements of the Meiteis in the land of Tripura.

== Language ==
The Meitei language (Meitei: ꯃꯩꯇꯩ ꯂꯣꯟ/মৈতৈ লোন, romanized: Meitei Lon), also known as the Manipuri language (Meitei: ꯃꯅꯤꯄꯨꯔꯤ ꯂꯣꯟ/মণিপুরী লোন, romanized: Manipuri Lon), is one of the seven officially declared minority languages, besides Kokborok and Bengali, recognised by the Government of Tripura. Its promotion and development are done by the Directorate of Kokborok & Other Minority Languages, established in August 2012. The Meitei language was introduced at Tripura University in 2023.

== Displacement ==
A militant group named "National Liberation Front of Tripura" targeted and forcibly displaced numerous minority Meiteis, especially peasants, from their settlements to other places in Tripura.

There were approximately 150 Meitei villages in Tripura at the time of India's independence (1947), but the number had reduced to fewer than 100 by the 2010s. Mekhli Para was founded in 1798 and was initially inhabited by Meiteis; however, it had no Meitei inhabitants by the 2010s.

== Culture ==
=== Clothing ===
Innaphi (Meitei: ꯏꯟꯅꯐꯤ) is a traditional Meitei cloth. A Meitei woman from Tripura (Note: Simultaneously with another Meitei woman from Manipur for the same cause.) achieved the National Handloom Award 2023, given by the Ministry of Textiles, Government of India, for her exceptional craftsmanship and dedication to the traditional art of handloom weaving Innaphi attires.

Meitei women wear numerous traditional clothes such as Rani Phi (Meitei: ꯔꯥꯅꯤ ꯐꯤ), Wangkhei Phi (Meitei: ꯋꯥꯡꯈꯩ ꯐꯤ), Moirang Phi (Meitei: ꯃꯣꯏꯔꯥꯡ ꯐꯤ), Phige (Meitei: ꯐꯤꯒꯦ) and Phanek (Meitei: ꯐꯅꯦꯛ). Meitei menfolk wear Khudei (Meitei: ꯈꯨꯗꯩ).

=== Festivals ===
The Tripura Government recognised the Meitei festival of Umang Lai Haraoba (Lai Haraoba dedicated to the Umang Lais) as one of their state festivals in 2015. Some of its celebrations are helped by the Department of Information and Cultural Affairs, Government of Tripura, alongside the traditional Meitei religious institutions.

=== Monuments ===
==== Statue of Paona Brajabashi ====
In April 2019, Manipuri Literary and Cultural Forum, Tripura and Paona Brajabashi Foundation Tripura, together opened a statue of Paona Brajabasi (Meitei: ꯄꯥꯎꯅꯥ ꯕ꯭ꯔꯖꯕꯥꯁꯤ), a Meitei freedom fighter, to the public in Gouranagar, Tripura.

==== Statue of Nupi Lan ====
In 2023, All Manipur United Clubs' Organisation (AMUCO) and Manipuri Literary & Cultural Forum, Tripura, collectively opened a statue of Nupi Lan (Meitei: ꯅꯨꯄꯤ ꯂꯥꯟ) to the public at Gournagar in Khowai district, Tripura.

=== Performing arts ===
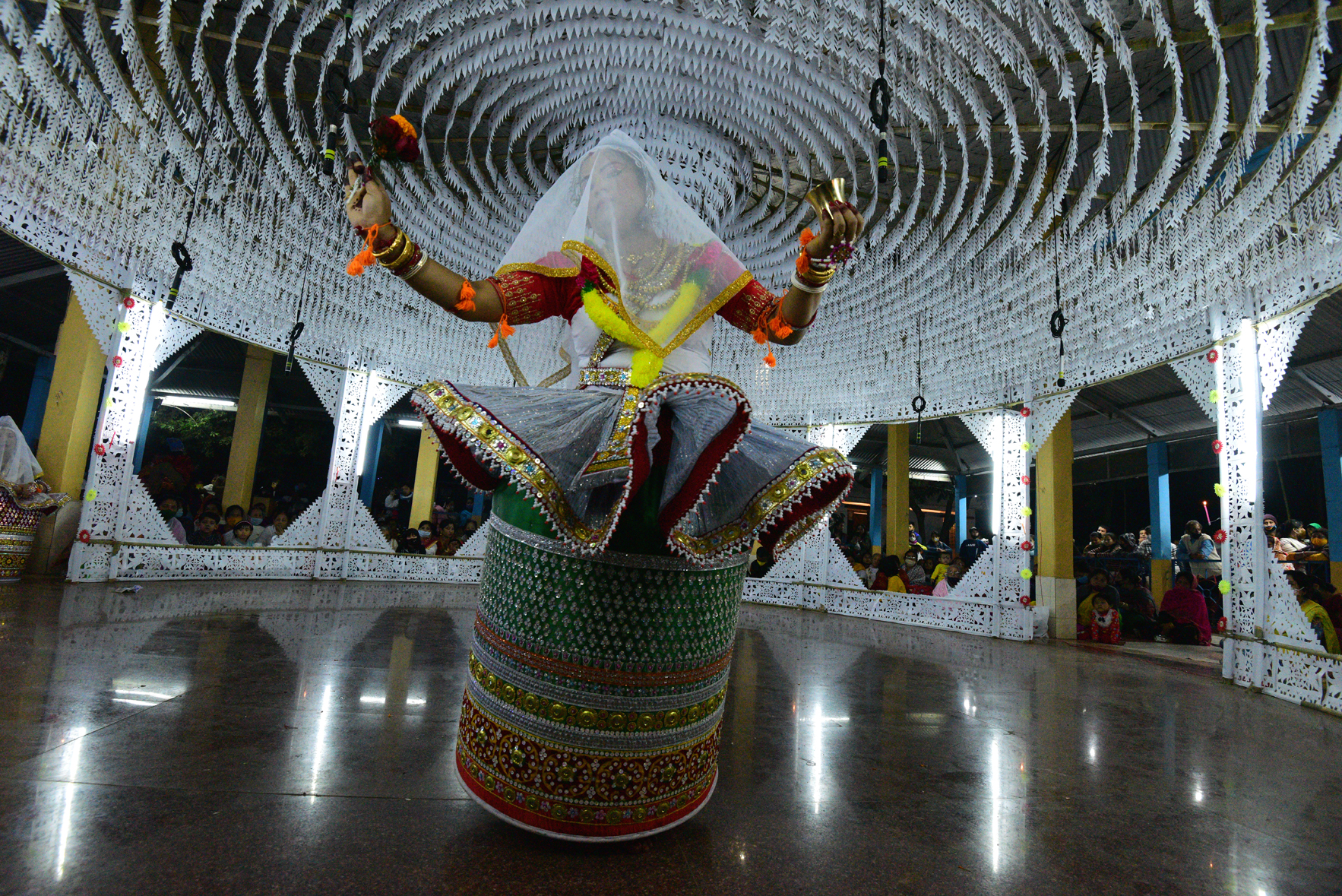
Manipuri dance performance in Agartala, Tripura

Manipuri Raas Leela (Meitei: ꯖꯒꯣꯏ ꯔꯥꯁ) is a big festival celebrated by the Meitei Hindus in Tripura. Wari Leeba (Meitei: ꯋꯥꯔꯤ ꯂꯤꯕ) is a traditional Meitei storytelling art tradition. Its popularity is declining among the Meiteis of Tripura.

=== Religions ===
Daughters of the Meitei kings of Manipur, who became queens of Tripura, built numerous temples and established multiple cults of different deities in Tripura. Among the Hindu deities, the cults of Krishna, Radha, Madhav, Govinda, etc. were established. The pantheon of Meitei deities of traditional Meitei religion (Sanamahism) is also kept alive by the Meiteis in Tripura. Notably, the Lai Haraoba (Meitei: ꯂꯥꯏ ꯍꯔꯥꯎꯕ) religious festival is annually celebrated in honour of numerous deities, especially God Puthiba (Meitei: ꯂꯥꯏꯅꯤꯡꯊꯧ ꯄꯨꯊꯤꯕ).

== Groups ==
- Manipuri Literary and Cultural Forum, Tripura

== Notable people ==
- Khuman Chanu Manmohini Devi (Meitei: ꯈꯨꯃꯟ ꯆꯅꯨ ꯃꯟꯃꯣꯍꯤꯅꯤ ꯗꯦꯕꯤ), a Meitei queen of Tripura, wife of Tripuri King Bir Chandra Manikya, and also the first female self-photographer of India.
- Sorokhaibam Gambhini (Meitei: ꯁꯣꯔꯣꯛꯈꯥꯏꯕꯝ ꯒꯝꯚꯤꯅꯤ), a Meitei poetess from Tripura, who won the Sahitya Akademi Award 2023.
- Konjengbam Sarita Devi (Meitei: ꯀꯣꯟꯖꯦꯡꯕꯝ ꯁꯔꯤꯇꯥ ꯗꯦꯕꯤ), a Meitei writer who represented Tripura in the "All India Women Writers' Meet" organised by the Sahitya Akademi, India's National Academy of Letters.
- Nirmala Sinha (Meitei: ꯅꯤꯔꯃꯂꯥ ꯁꯤꯟꯍꯥ), a Meitei woman from Barasurma village in Dhalai District, who was awarded the National Handloom Award 2023 by the Ministry of Textiles, Government of India.
- Khoisnam Birola (Meitei: ꯈꯣꯏꯁꯅꯥꯝ ꯕꯤꯔꯣꯂꯥ), a Meitei poet from Agartala who was appointed a member of the Meitei Language Advisory Board, Sahitya Akademi, New Delhi (2023–2027). She is the first Meitei woman to become a member from outside the state of Manipur.

== See also ==
- Meitei people in Assam
- Meitei people in Bangladesh
- Meitei people in Myanmar
