= Manipur State Constitution Act 1947 =

Act in Manipur state for a de jure constitution

Manipur State Constitution Act

Constitution-making Committee
- Territorial extent: Manipur
- Passed by: Manipur (princely state)
- Passed: 26 July 1947
- Enacted: 1947
- Signed by: Maharaja Bodhchandra Singh
- Date of expiry: 15 October 1949
- Status: Unknown

Manipur State Constitution Act 1947 is an act which enabled the princely state of Manipur to have a de jure written constitution enacted by the last Maharajah of Manipur, Bodhchandra Singh. Under the constitution, a Legislative Assembly was elected in mid-1948 and a ministry was formed, which was responsible to the Maharaja. The constitution is deemed to have lapsed on 15 October 1949, when the Maharaja signed a merger agreement with the Indian Union. The validity of the act in present time is debated.

== Background ==
After the 1891 rebellion in Manipur, the British took direct control of the state's administration. While the Maharaja was retained as a nominal head of state, the real power rested with the British Political Agent and a British official appointed as the President of the Durbar. The other members of the Durbar served as ministers and advisors. The hill regions, populated by Naga and Kuki tribes, were administered by the British official without the involvement of the Durbar.

In 1934, Nikhil Manipuri Mahsabha (NMM) was established by Hijam Irabot with the-then Maharajah Churachand Singh as president. By 1938 it had become a prominent political front advocating the democratization of the powers held by the Durbar and an overhaul of the corrupt colonial administration. Proposals for reforms were twice submitted to the Durbar in 1938 and 1939. They called for abolition of exploitative taxes, reunification of the hills with the valley, establishment of self-rule, installation of a Panchayat system, and the establishment of a unicameral legislature based on suffrage.

Fissures between the royal house and NMM were also prominent; NMM was declared a political party whereby no state government employee could participate in it and Irabot had to resign from the Sadar Court. In the ensuing deliberations, Churachand and the President of the Durbar F. F. Pearson declined the demands of NMM, claiming that Manipur was not "ripe for democracy". Popular resistance continued — the Second Nupi Lan would play a significant role in mobilizing anti-feudal sentiments in the masses.

Maharaja Bodhchandra Singh succeeded Churachand Singh in November 1941. Whilst the political scene was quiet during World War II, after the war, he was subject to a protracted and vigorous resistance from multiple political parties — Irabot's Manipur Krishak Sabha (MKS), Manipur Praja Sangha and Manipur State Congress etc. In August 1946, NMM passed a resolution urging the immediate establishment of constitution-drafting machinery. Krishak Sabha and Praja Sangha demanded a "responsible" government in multiple meetings, throughout the year. By 21 September, Bodhchandra Singh seems to have conceded the demand for a (legislative) assembly and asked the British government for permission. Finally, on the advice of Cabinet Mission, he consented to the formation of a Constitution Making Committee in December 1946.

== Constitution-making ==
The Constitution-Making Committee had 15 members: five members were selected from a consultation with "educated men" of the Hills, five members were elected from the Valley, two members were nominated by the Maharaja and the Chairman of the Chief Court, and the remaining three members were nominated by the Durbar. Overall, the committee was dominated by Congress men and their sympathizers. The Hill members were Athiko Daiho, R. Suisa, Teba Kilong, T. C. Tiankham, and Thongopao Kipgen. The president of the Durbar, F. F. Pearson, became the chairman. Krishak Sabha as well as Praja Sangha had criticized the composition of the Committee as undemocratic and boycotted the elections to the Committee. The representatives of the hills proposed the right of secession after a period of five years, which were rejected by the remaining members.

The Committee was formally inaugurated on 3 March 1947. On 10 March, the Maharajah addressed it in a public ceremony. The first meeting was held on 24 March, and, on 29 March, broad resolutions were adopted on the central features of the would-be constitution. A constitution-drafting committee was formed under the chairmanship of Ibunghohal Singh, and a hill local self-government regulation sub-committee was formed under the chairmanship of Pearson. The final version of the constitution was passed by the Committee in May 1947. The draft was soon vetted by the Durbar and on receiving Maharaja's consent, was enacted as the Manipur State Constitution Act 1947 on 27 July 1947. The report submitted by the hill local self-government regulation sub-committee was passed as the Manipur State Hill Peoples (Administration) Regulation 1947.

== Implementation ==
In July 1947, the Maharaja replaced the Manipur State Darbar by a Manipur State Council, whose members were termed "ministers", and F. F. Pearson became the Chief Minister. On 14 August, this arrangement was replaced by an Interim Council, with M. K. Priyobrata Singh, the younger brother of the Maharaja as the Chief Minister, and eight other members as ministers, of which two were Manipur State Congress members, and two were Hill representatives. These moves were seen as an attempt by the Maharaja to take power into his own hands.

A Franchise Sub-committee was created on 14 October 1947, but elections were not held for at least a year. Manipur State Election Rules were formulated in 1948, with the following representation for 53 seats in the assembly:

- 30 general constituencies in the Valley. Moirang was made a special constituency, which could elect two candidates, one from the Valley and one from the Hills.
- 3 reserved constituencies in the Valley, Lilong, Mayang Imphal and Yairipok, which were reserved for Meitei Pangals (Muslims).
- 18 hill constituencies where only hill people could contest the election.
- 2 special constituenceis: educational constituency and commercial & industrial constituency.

Election to the Manipur State Assembly was held between 11 June and 27 July 1948. It produced a hung assembly with no single party carrying the majority. Manipur State Congress won 14 seats, Manipur Krishak Sabha won 6 seats, a new party called Praja Shanti Party, believed to have been floated by the Maharaja, won 12 seats, and the hill representatives, dubbed "independents", won 18 seats. (Note: The hill representatives are often described as belonging 'Hill Independents Union'. But as matter of fact, they belonged to several ethnic political parties, such as Tangkhul Long, Kabui Association, Kuki National Assembly, Mizo Union, and Khulmi National Union etc.) The Praja Shanti Party formed the government in alliance with the Krishak Sabha and the hill representatives. Maharaja's brother Priyobrata Singh was reappointed as the Chief Minister, despite not being a member of the Assembly.

== Assessment ==
The election held under the state constitution in 1948 has been touted as the first democratic election in India on full adult franchise. However, the claim has been disputed. Phanjoubam Tarapot notes, "all people were not allowed to cast votes to elect their representatives. Only the rich, landowners and educated persons could exercise their franchise."

With an elected assembly and appointment of ministers, Manipur was claimed to have become a "constitutional monarchy", sometimes prefixed with the label "independent". However, scholar Sudhirkumar Singh notes that the chief minister was appointed by the Maharaja, without any requirement of being an elected member of the assembly. Further, according the constitution, "the ministry was responsible to the Maharaja and not to the assembly". According to Sanghamitra Choudhury, the new government "was not responsible to the legislature; instead, it was only responsive to the legislature, which was a technicality devised by the constitutional experts of Maharaja".

Hijam Irabot, the seniormost democratic leader in the state, opposed the constitution saying there was no article guaranteeing "independence of Manipur and democracy". Nevertheless, he participated in the Assembly election and won the seat from the Utlou constituency. However, before the Assembly met, he was outlawed for holding a protest meeting against the positions of Manipur State Congress. He was forced to go underground and his seat was declared vacant.

The state constitution was short-lived. In October 1949, the Maharaja was invited to a meeting in Shillong, and asked to sign a merger agreement with the Indian Union. When he asked for consultation with his ministry, he was told that the Government of India did not recognise the Assembly and the Ministry formed under the state constitution.

After the merger, the state assembly and the ministry were dissolved and Manipur became a Part 'C' State of India (akin to a Chief Commissioner's Province). There was not much public response to the development in Manipur, save for a single student protest under the banner of the Communist Party of Manipur. Sudhirkumar Singh remarks that no serious response could have been expected because the state was "characterised by low literacy and shallow political culture".

== Bibliography ==
- Das, Samir K. (2010). "India: Democracy, Nation, and the Spirals of Insecurity: State Response to Ethnic Separatism in India's Northeast". In Robert G. Wirsing; Ehsan Ahrari (eds.). Fixing Fractured Nations. London: Palgrave Macmillan UK. p. 123. ISBN 978-1-349-31464-5.
- Indrakumar, Konthoujam (2015). "Colonialism and Movement for Democracy in Manipur". In Arambam Noni; Kangujam Sanatomba (eds.). Colonialism and Resistance: Society and State in Manipur. Routledge. pp. 61–69. doi:10.4324/9781315638317. ISBN 978-1-00-304589-2.
- Kipgen, Nehginpao (October–December 2011), "Ethnic Conflict in India: A Case Study of the Kukis and the Nagas in Manipur", The Indian Journal of Political Science, 72 (4): 1043–1060, JSTOR 41856539
- Parratt, John (2005), Wounded Land: Politics and Identity in Modern Manipur, Mittal Publications, ISBN 9788183240536
- Parratt, John; Parratt, Saroj Arambam (2000). "Hijam Irabot and the Radical Socialist Democratic Movement in Manipur". Internationales Asienforum (in German). 31 (3–4): 275–288. doi:10.11588/iaf.2000.31.988.
- Sudhirkumar Singh (2011). Socio-religious and Political Movements in Modern Manipur. Jawaharlal Nehru University. p. 120. hdl:10603/121665.
- Tarapot, Phanjoubam (2003), Bleeding Manipur, Har-Anand Publications, ISBN 978-81-241-0902-1
