= Hijam =

Hijam is a Meitei ethnic family name (surname). Notable people with the surname include:

- Bala Hijam (born 1992), Indian actress
- Hijam Anganghal (1892–1943), poet
- Hijam Irabot (1896–1951), freedom fighter, politician, and writer
