= Manipuri Literary and Cultural Forum =

Cultural organization of the Meitei people

Manipuri Literary and Cultural Forum, Tripura
- (Meitei: ꯃꯅꯤꯄꯨꯔꯤ ꯂꯤꯇꯔꯦꯔꯤ ꯑꯦꯟꯗ ꯀꯜꯆꯔꯦꯜ ꯐꯣꯔꯝ ꯇ꯭ꯔꯤꯄꯨꯔꯥ)
- Official logo of the Manipuri Literary and Cultural Forum, Tripura
- Abbreviation: MLCF Tripura
- Named after: Manipuri people
- Formation: 2010
- Legal status: active
- Purpose: for the development of Meitei language (officially known as Manipuri language), its literature and culture
- Location: Tripura
- Region served: Northeast India
- Official language: Meitei language (officially called Manipuri language)

Manipuri Literary and Cultural Forum, Tripura (Meitei: ꯃꯅꯤꯄꯨꯔꯤ ꯂꯤꯇꯔꯦꯔꯤ ꯑꯦꯟꯗ ꯀꯜꯆꯔꯦꯜ ꯐꯣꯔꯝ ꯇ꯭ꯔꯤꯄꯨꯔꯥ) is a group that works for the development of Meitei language (officially known as Manipuri language), its literature and culture in the Indian state of Tripura and other Manipuri populated areas.

It regularly organises book release and annual prize distribution programs in Tripura.

== Working together with the Sahitya Akademi ==
In January 2024, Manipuri Literary and Cultural Forum, Tripura (Meitei: ꯃꯅꯤꯄꯨꯔꯤ ꯂꯤꯇꯔꯦꯔꯤ ꯑꯦꯟꯗ ꯀꯜꯆꯔꯦꯜ ꯐꯣꯔꯝ ꯇ꯭ꯔꯤꯄꯨꯔꯥ) organised a meeting of scholars, on the topic "Aspects of Manipuri Literature", working together with the Sahitya Akademi, New Delhi, in the conference hall of Tripura Students' Health Home, near Agartala Press Club and Literary forum on the Life & Works of Kavi Ashangbam Minaketan Singh at Sahitya Akademi auditorium hall, Tripura.

== Language day celebrations ==
The Manipuri Literary and Cultural Forum Tripura (Meitei: ꯃꯅꯤꯄꯨꯔꯤ ꯂꯤꯇꯔꯦꯔꯤ ꯑꯦꯟꯗ ꯀꯜꯆꯔꯦꯜ ꯐꯣꯔꯝ ꯇ꯭ꯔꯤꯄꯨꯔꯥ) organised the 32nd edition of Manipuri Language Day, to honor the recognition of Manipuri language in the 8th Schedule of the Constitution of India. For the celebration, it worked together with Khowai Meira Paibi and All Khowai Meitei Apunba Lup, in Khowai New Town hall in Khowai district and at Golaghati Govindajee Sarik Makhol Mandop Tripura arranged togetherly with Takhel Leima Lup. In the both event, cultural and musical programmes of the Meitei people was shown.

== Opening of monuments ==
=== Statue of Paona Brajabashi ===
In April 2019, Manipuri Literary and Cultural Forum Tripura and Paona Brajabashi Foundation Tripura, together opened a statue of Paona Brajabashi, a freedom fighter, to the public in Gouranagar, Tripura. Visitors gave flower offerings to the statue of Paona Brajabashi, remembering his dedications and sacrifices to the freedom struggles.

=== Statue of Nupi Lan ===
In 2023, All Manipur United Clubs' Organisation (AMUCO) and Manipuri Literary & Cultural Forum, Tripura, collectively opened a statue of Nupi lan to the public, at Gournagar in Khowai district, Tripura for first time beyond Manipur.

== Honouring freedom fighters, martyrs and patriots ==
=== Khongjom Day celebration ===
In April 2021, Manipuri Literary and Cultural Forum, Tripura, organised the Khongjom Day celebration, honouring the heroes of the Anglo Manipuri war, at Paona Brajabashi Park, Gournagar in Tripura.

=== Patriots' day celebrations ===
In August 2021, Manipuri Literary and Cultural Forum, Tripura and Meira Paibi, Khowai, together celebrated Patriots' Day in the Paona Brajabasi Park, Khowai Meitei village, Gouranagar of Tripura. People gave flower offerings to Bir Tikendrajit, Thangal General and other martyrs of Meitei community of the Anglo-Manipur War.

=== Honouring Nupi Lan ===
Every year, in December, the Manipuri Literary and Cultural Forum Tripura, and All Manipur United Clubs' Organization (AMUCO), together organise the Nupi Lan Memorial Day of the two historic movements of the brave mothers of Manipur against the British Empire, in Gitanjali Auditorium in Agartala.

=== Birth anniversary of Major Paona Brajabashi ===
In December every year, Manipuri Literary and Cultural Forum, Tripura, organises the birth anniversary of Major Paona Brajabashi, at Abhoynagar and Goumagar in Khowai district of Tripura.

== See also ==
- Bangladesh Manipuri Sahitya Sangsad
- Loktak Folklore Museum
