= Meitei constitution (disambiguation) =

Meitei Constitution (or Manipuri Constitution) may also refer to:

- Meitei Leingaklon, an ancient Meitei Constitution, drafted in 5th century CE and finalised in 11th century CE, in the Meitei kingdom of Kangleipak (Manipur)
- Manipur State Constitution Act 1947, a historical Constitution, once legalized in Manipur state, which draws direct inspiration from the Loiyumpa Silyel
- Meitei language version of the Constitution of India, officially published by the Union Government of India and the State Government of Manipur

== See also ==
- Meitei culture
- Meitei people
