= Mission Compound (Old Churachandpur) =

Mission Compound (Old Churachandpur) also known as Old Churachand is a small Indian village of historical importance, situated 7.4 km west of Churachandpur Police Station and 62.5 km from Imphal Airport.

== History ==
The Government of Manipur established an administrative headquarters in south of Manipur State for the Sub-Divisional Officer in about 1918. This headquarters is called Churachandpur, after the then Maharaja of Manipur, Sir Churachand Singh.

The Reverend H.H. Coleman, the then General Secretary of the North East India General Mission (NEIGM) visited Manipur with Dr. G.G. Crozier, then Field Superintendent called on the Maharaja, whose daughter was lying sick at that time. Dr. Crozier and Rev. Coleman immediately attended to her, and on her recovery, the Maharaja readily leased out the SDO Headquarters and its peripherals for the inhabitants for farming and other development activities. The abandoned Government administrative centre; the Lord kept ready the infrastructures of the Government headquarters for the Mission use. What a great and faithful God! The village is the torch bearer of the Gospel in Southern Manipur and beyond.

After 50 years, NEIGM Leaders' Conference in 1980 handed over the village administration to the inhabitants Vide orders No. 9/8/DC(South)/VA/80, dated 22 September 1980 of Deputy Commissioner of Manipur South District, Mission Compound became a recognized village of the Government under the Manipur (Village Authorities in Hill Areas) Act, 1956.
