= Women in Meitei culture =

Women have significant roles in different elements of Meitei culture, including Meitei dances, Meitei festivals, Meitei folklore, Meitei folktales, Meitei literature, Meitei mythology, Meitei religion, etc.

== Women as goddesses ==
Besides natural elements and phenomena personified as divine feminine beings, venerated and worshipped by the Meitei people in Meitei religion, many women are also deified to the same status. The personality of Imoinu, Panthoibi and Phouoibi shows as well as influences the boldness, courage, independence, righteousness and social honour of Meitei women.

Leimarel Sidabi (Meitei: ꯂꯩꯃꯔꯦꯜ ꯁꯤꯗꯕꯤ), also known as Leimalel Sitapi (Meitei: ꯂꯩꯃꯂꯦꯜ ꯁꯤꯇꯄꯤ), is an ancient Meitei goddess associated with earth, nature and the household. In Meitei mythology and the religion of Ancient Kangleipak (early Manipur), she is the highest female divinity as well as is revered as the mother of every living being in the universe.

Imoinu, also spelled as Emoinu (Meitei: ꯏꯃꯣꯏꯅꯨ), is an ancient Meitei goddess, associated with household, hearth, family, fireplace, kitchen, wealth, peace and prosperity. In Meitei mythology and religion of Ancient Kangleipak (Antique Manipur), she is also identified as a form of goddess Leimarel Sidabi.

In Meitei mythology and religion of Ancient Kangleipak (early Manipur), Panthoibi (Meitei: ꯄꯥꯟꯊꯣꯏꯕꯤ, romanized: Paanthoibee, Old Manipuri: ꯄꯥꯟꯊꯣꯢꯄꯤ, romanized: Panthoipi), also known as Nongpok Leima (Meitei for 'Queen of the East'), is an ancient Meitei goddess associated with civilization, courage, fertility, handicraft, love, victory, warfare and wisdom. She is considered to be a divine incarnation of goddess Leimarel Sidabi as well as that of Nongthang Leima.

In Meitei mythology and religion of Ancient Kangleipak (early Manipur), Phouoibi, also known as Phouleima, is an ancient Meitei goddess associated with agriculture, crops, fertility, grains, harvest, paddy, rice and wealth.

== Women in Meitei literature ==
The Meitei Chanu (poem) depicts the feminization of the Meitei language and Meitei literature. Its opening lines notably shows the idea of a culture that is prevalent in the form of a shrine (Meitei: ꯂꯥꯏꯁꯡ, ꯂꯥꯏꯁꯪ, romanized: laishang). The very literary temple refers to the remaining empty without a goddess (Meitei: ꯂꯥꯏꯔꯦꯝꯕꯤ, romanized: lairembi) for a very long period of time. This metaphor shows significant transformation in history as "Ema" (Meitei: ꯏꯃꯥ, romanized: /í.ma/, lit. 'mother') or the "Meitei Chanu" (Meitei: ꯃꯩꯇꯩ ꯆꯅꯨ, romanized: /mə́i.təi cə.nu/, lit. 'Meitei Lady') re-occupies the temple. The reasons why she could enter into her past shrine once again are because of the western education, their imitations and the feminization of language and literature.

== Women in music ==
=== In traditional music ===
In the 2010s, Ima Thoinu, a traditional Moirang Sai singer, got only a few students to learn the endangered art form, which was the only means to keep it alive. A small group of performers are again learning the nearly extinct art form of the Moirang Sai to save it from total extinction. The art form was outstandingly revived due to the hard works of Mangka Mayanglambam (Meitei: ꯃꯪꯀꯥ ꯃꯌꯥꯡꯂꯝꯕꯝ), a traditional Meitei folk singer and artist of the "Laihui" (Meitei: ꯂꯥꯏꯍꯨꯏ). Mangka is re-popularising the nearly extinct art form among the present youth once again.

== Women's only market ==
The Ima Market (Meitei: Ima Keithel, lit. 'Mothers' Market'), also known as the Nupi Keithel (Meitei for 'Women's Market') or the Khwairamband Keithel (Meitei for 'Khwairamband Market'), in Imphal, is the only market in the world run entirely by women. Inside the market, male shopkeepers and vendors are not allowed to sell anything.

The three major building complexes of the Ima Market are named after three prominent ancient Meitei goddesses, who are Leimarel Sidabi (for Market No. 1), Emoinu/Imoinu (for Market No. 2) and Phouoibi (for Market No. 3).

Ima Keithel is a classic example of the long-lasting tradition of business management done by Meitei women in Manipur. Traditionally, Meitei women always enjoyed high status in the economy of the society. Women lead the trade and commerce in food and vegetables, household things and clothes in Meitei society. In history, it is the symbol of the empowerment and the leadership prospects of Meitei women in Manipur.

== Women's rebellions ==
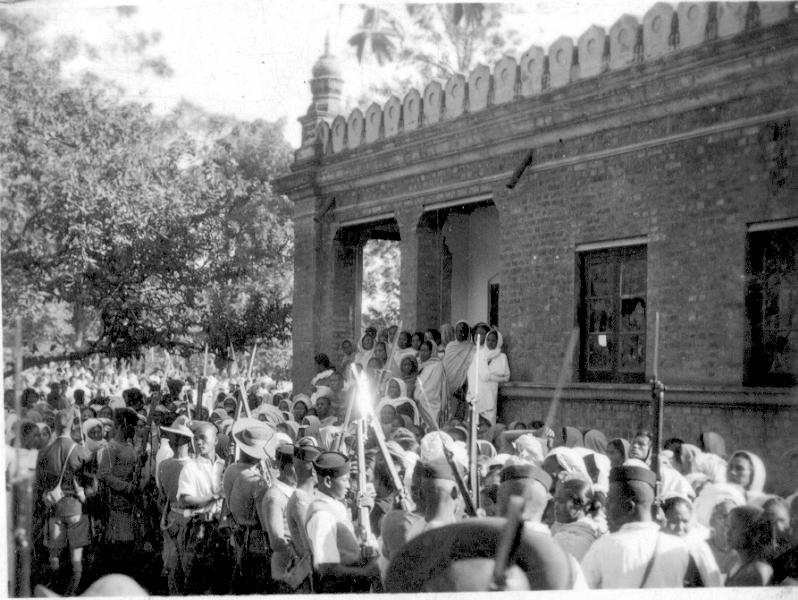
A photograph of a Nupi Lan (Meitei for 'Women's war') in Manipur Kingdom against British colonial rule c. 1904

== Women torch bearers ==
The Meira Paibi (Meitei for 'torch holding woman') are traditional Meitei women's social organisations and their movements in Manipur.They originated during the times when there were no artificial light available or rare in Manipur, hence the womenfolk used handmade torches to light the paths. They work against many different social evils, like the misuse of military powers by the Indian Army in Manipur, India. They are called the "Guardians of the society". The name comes from the burning torches that the women carry. The torch has become the symbol of peaceful protest for justice at all levels of life.

== Women in extravaganzas ==
Miss Meetei Chanu, also spelled as Miss Meitei Chanu, is an annual beauty pageant that is run by the Manipur based Lainingthou Sanamahi Sana Pung (LSSP), aiming to make Meitei women understand the culture and tradition of Sanamahism (traditional Meitei religion).

== See also ==
- Plants in Meitei culture
- Hills and mountains in Meitei culture
- Birds in Meitei culture
- Animals in Meitei culture
- Women in Buddhist culture
- Women in Christian culture
- Women in Hindu culture
- Women in Islamic culture
- Women in Jewish culture
