= Manmohini Devi =

Third Maharani consort of Tripura

Khuman Chanu Manmohini
- Takhel Leima
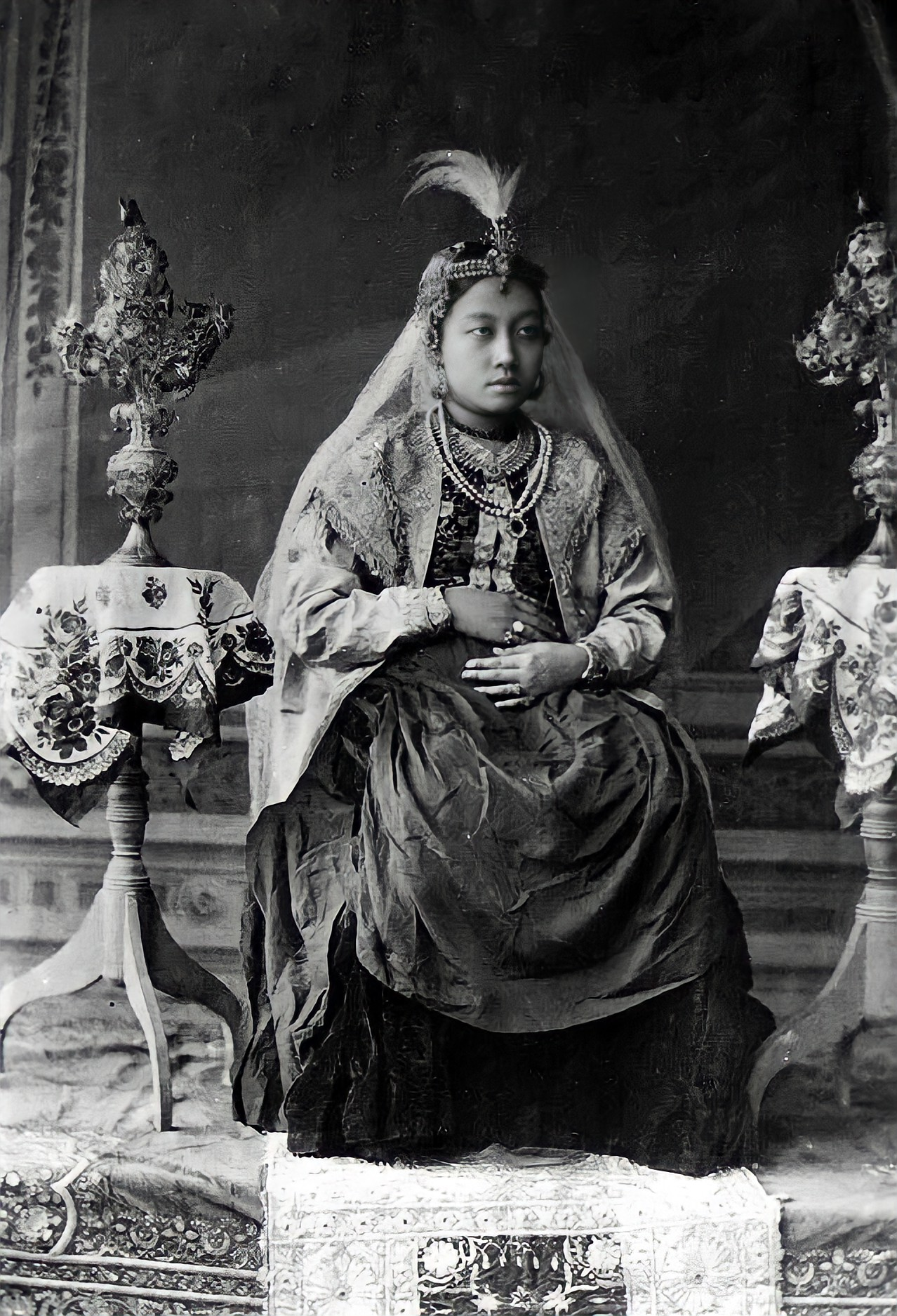
- Royal portrait c. 1880
- Bir Chandra Manikya
- paternal: Khuman
- Dynasty: Manikya dynasty (by marriage)
- Religion: Vaishnavism
- Occupation: Queen

Maharani Khuman Chanu Manmohini Devi was the niece and third Maharani consort of Tripura through her marriage to Maharaja Birchandra Manikya. She was one of the Meitei queens of Tripura. She was a contemporary royal photographer who choreographed her self-portraits with the Maharaja, and was considered the first Indian woman who mastered the art of photography.

== Biography ==
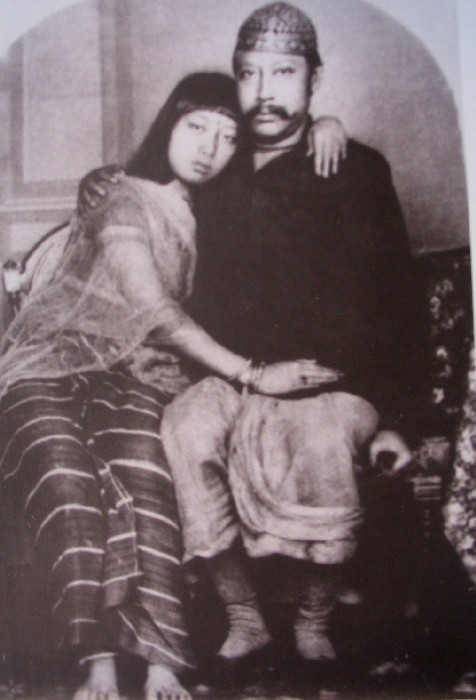
Portrait of Manamohini Devi with Maharaja in 1880, is perhaps the first self-portrait by a couple in India.

She was the niece of the Maharaja, daughter of his first wife, Queen Ningthem Chanu Bhanumati's sister. She married Maharaja when she was only 13 years. The Maharaja gave the land at Math Chowmuhani as her share. She also established a temple and a 'mandapa' near the present Iskcon temple at Tripura.

She became a royal photographer under the tutelage of her husband, and she organized photography exhibitions in the palace where both of their photographs were exhibited. The Journal of the Photographic Society of India – May 1890 Issue emphasized their photographs with the title "The Camera Club of the Palace of Agartala." She is regarded as India's first female photographer.

== See also ==
- Meitei people in Tripura
