= Priyobrata Singh =

Priyobarta Singh
- Born: Maharaj Kumar Priyobrata Singh; 17 February 1911; Sana Konung, Imphal
- Died: 29 October 2005 (aged 94); Kombirei, Palace Compound, Imphal
- Parent(s): Churachand Maharaj; Rani Chingakham Ningol Shyamasakhi
- Family: (male siblings) Maharaja Bodh Chandra (1908-55); M.K. Ghanendrajit (1922-2008); M.K. Lokendra (Born 1915); M.K. Joy (1921-73); M.K. Tokendra Bir Singh (Born 1932)

Maharaj Kumar Priyobrata Singh was a member of the royal family and a political official in the princely state of Manipur, under British Raj and later, the Indian Union. He served as Chief Minister of the princely state in independent India from 15 August 1947 to 15 October 1949.

== Early life ==
Priyobrata Singh was the second son of Maharaja Churachand Singh born to Rani Shyamasakhi on 17 February 1911. He was educated at the Rajkumar College, Raipur in present-day Chhattisgarh. He continued his studies at the Ewing Christian College, Allahabad (now called Prayagraj) and graduated with a B.A. degree from the Allahabad University in 1934.

== Career ==
Priyobrata Singh was appointed a member of Manipur State Durbar in 1936 and given the portfolio of Education, Police and P.W.D. He also supervised Manipur State Arts and Crafts.

He was commissioned as an Emergency Commissioned Officer in August, 1942 and served with the 2nd Assam Regiment. Relieved in early 1947, he rejoined the State Durbar and was in charge of police.

He was involved in the Bharat Sevak. He became a member and President of the Manipur Cultural Conference, a socio-cultural organisation, which attempted to increase understanding between the state's various ethnic groups. He visited all the villages in the hill areas of Manipur.

He was involved with the Manipur Spinning Mills Corporation at its initial stage. He introduced exotic plants into the state, including sandalwood, Araucaria, pinus longifolia, kendu, yew, Spathodea, Eucalyptus, and Sal Deodarun. He worked to establish Dhanamanjuri College and Shyamasakhi Girls High School.

After the introduction of the Manipur State Constitution Act 1947 he became a minister in the Interim Council. On 14 August 1947, he was appointed as the Chief Minister, taking over the post from the British political officer F.F. Pearson. He headed the Interim Council from 14 August 1947 to 7 October 1948. After the election to the Manipur State Assembly, he was reappointed as Chief Minister with the concurrence of the ruling party, the Praja Shanti. He also held the post of Dewan, reporting to the Government of India, until 18 April 1949.

== Later life ==
After politics, he devoted his life to social activities and painting. He was a pioneer in contemporary painting in Manipur. His contribution to the Imphal Arts College was notable.

== Recognition ==
- Manipur University honoured him with D.Litt. (Honours Causa).
- The Cultural Forum awarded him the Thoibi award in 1991
- Manipuri Sahitya Parishad gave him the Srimad Paramhans Swami Yogendra Giri Memorial in 2000.
