= Meitei queens of Tripura =

Meitei royal women in Tripura

Meitei queens of Tripura (Manipuri queens of Tripura)
- (Meitei: Takhel Leima)
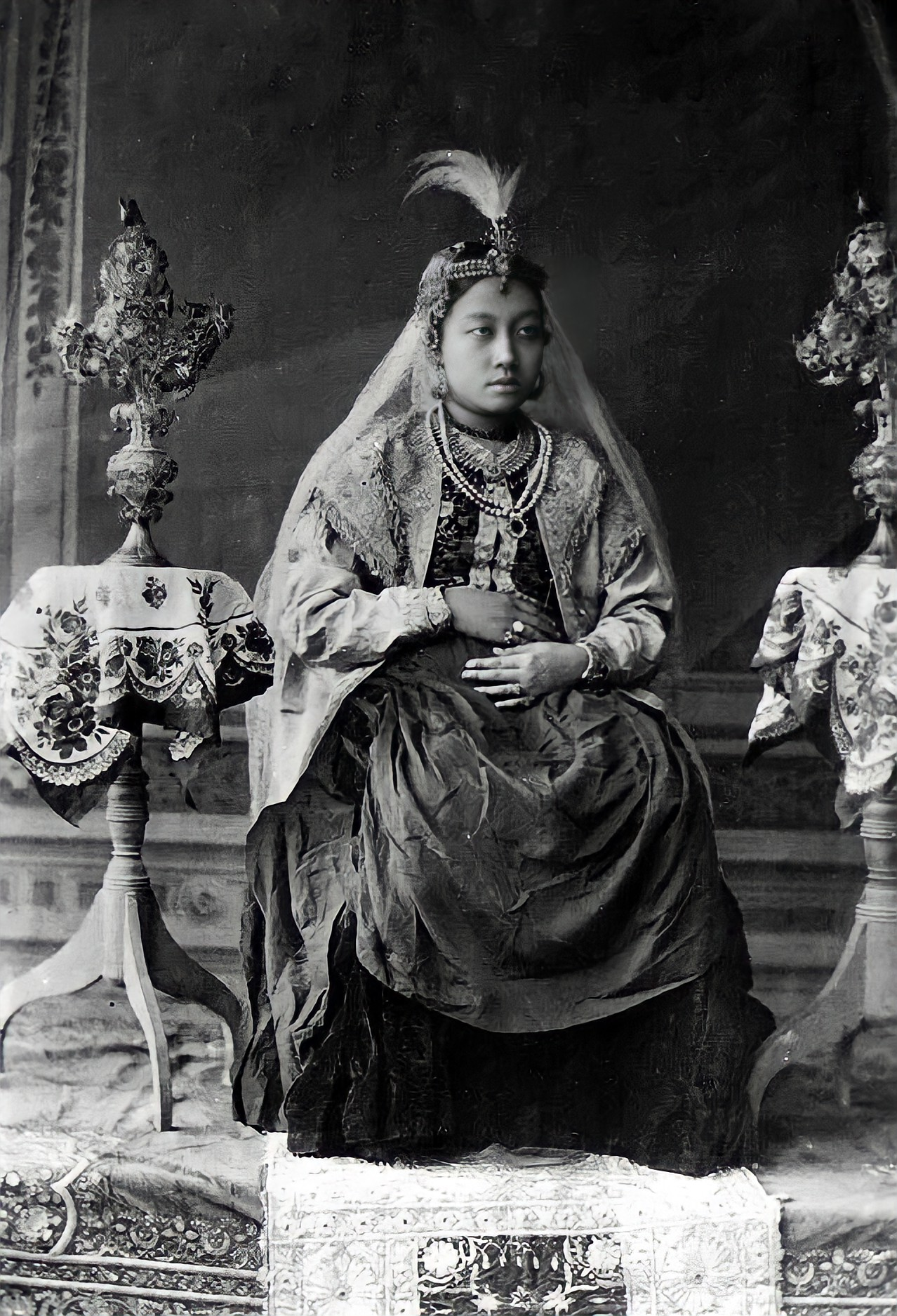
- Meitei Lady Manmohini Devi, the queen of Tripura, and the first female self photographer of India
- Status: queens
- Member of: royal family of Tripura kingdom
- Residence: Agartala
- Nominator: Manikya rulers of Tripura kingdom
- Appointer: Manikya rulers of Tripura kingdom

The royal marriage alliances between the Meitei royal family, Ningthouja dynasty (Meitei: ꯅꯤꯡꯊꯧꯖꯥ) of Manipur kingdom and the Manikya dynasty of Tripura kingdom brought good relationship between the two states as well as assimilation of the two cultures. The Tripuri kings married not only the Meitei princesses but also many other ladies of commoners' families of Meitei community (alias Manipuri ethnicity). Meitei queens were remembered for their contributions to the development of the Tripuri society. So, they were given high status in the royal house of Tripura.

== Early queens ==
=== Unnamed queen ===
The first historically recorded matrimonial alliances between the Meitei kingdom and Tripura kingdom is mentioned in the Tripuri royal chronicle of "Sri Rajmala". According to the book, Tripuri King Taidakshin, who was the grandson of King Trilochana, married a Meitei princess in 5th century CE. However, names of the princess as well as of her father was not mentioned.

=== Queen Yangnu ===
Cheitharol Kumbaba (Meitei: ꯆꯩꯊꯥꯔꯣꯜ ꯀꯨꯝꯕꯥꯕ), the Meitei royal chronicle of Manipur kingdom, mentioned that in 1609, a lady named Yangnu (Meitei: ꯌꯥꯡꯅꯨ) of the Akhoicham family (Meitei: ꯑꯀꯣꯏꯆꯝ / ꯑꯀꯣꯏꯖꯝ), who was the wife of a Tripuri King went to her country. However, there were little details on the marriage.

== Maharani designated queens ==
=== Queen Hariseswari ===
Hariseswari (Meitei: ꯍꯔꯤꯁꯦꯁ꯭ꯋꯔꯤ) was the wife of Tripuri King Rajdhar Manikya II (1785–1804) and the daughter of Meitei King Bhagyachandra (Meitei: ꯅꯤꯡꯊꯧ ꯚꯥꯒ꯭ꯌꯆꯟꯗ꯭ꯔ) alias Joy Singh (Meitei: ꯖꯌ ꯁꯤꯡꯍ) (1759-1761 and 1763-1798). King Bhagyachandra went for pilgrimages to many holy and sacred places of India. On his way, he visited and stayed in Agartala, the Tripuri capital, for few days. During his stay, he offered his daughter, princess Hariseswari, hand in marriage to Tripuri King Rajdhar Manikya II. This marriage brought cordial relations between the two kingdoms. The Meitei king then left Tripura for his further pilgrimage. Meitei Queen Hariseswari brought an idol of Hindu deity, Sri Radhamadhav, from her homeland Manipur. It was installed in the royal palace of Tripura. Meitei priests, musicians, noblemen and maid attendants of the Meitei princess came from Manipur and settled in Tripura. They lived near the royal house at a newly established village called Mekhlipara (Meitei: ꯃꯦꯈꯂꯤꯄꯥꯔꯥ).

=== Queen Kutilakha/Kutilakshi ===
Kutilakha (Meitei: ꯀꯨꯇꯤꯂꯈꯥ), also known as Kutilakshi (Meitei: ꯀꯨꯇꯤꯂꯛꯁꯤ), was the wife of Tripuri King Kashichandra Manikya (1826-1829) and a Meitei princess of Manipur kingdom. In 1826, she married the king. The king was attracted to the beauty, cleanliness and health of the Meitei ladies living in Tripura kingdom. Furthermore, he married three other Meitei ladies from Tripura kingdom itself.

=== Chandrakola, Vidhukola and Akhileswari ===
Chandrakola (Meitei: ꯆꯟꯗ꯭ꯔꯀꯣꯂꯥ), Vidhukola (Meitei: ꯋꯤꯙꯨꯀꯣꯂꯥ) and Akhileswari (Meitei: ꯑꯈꯤꯂꯦꯁ꯭ꯋꯔꯤ) were the daughters of Meitei King Marjit Singh (Meitei: ꯅꯤꯡꯊꯧ ꯃꯥꯔꯖꯤꯠ ꯁꯤꯡꯍ) of Manipur kingdom. They were all married to the Tripuri King Krishna Kishore Manikya (1829-1849 A.D.), who was also a son of a Meitei queen.

=== Queen Purnakala ===
Purnakala (Meitei: ꯄꯨꯔꯅꯀꯂꯥ) was a Meitei Brahmin woman. She was a cook (domestic worker) in the Tripuri royal kitchen but later got married and became the chief queen of Tripuri King Krishna Kishore Manikya. This marriage was not supported by the Meitei people in Tripura. According to Hindu culture, it was not customary for a kshatriya (royalty) to marry a lady from Brahmin community (priest community). Purnakala was not taken by King Krishna Kishore Manikya to the royal palace. So, a house was built at Haidra (Dholeswar) for her where she lived along with her subjects. From that time in 1838, the construction of a new palace named Nutan Haveli (Meitei: ꯅꯨꯇꯥꯟ ꯍꯋꯦꯂꯤ) began in Agartala. Thus, Queen Purnakala was one of the reasons for the establishment of a new capital in Agartala.

=== Queen Moirangthem Chanu Muktabali Devi ===
Moirangthem Chanu Muktabali Devi (Meitei: ꯃꯣꯏꯔꯥꯡꯊꯦꯝ ꯆꯅꯨ ꯃꯨꯛꯇꯥꯕꯂꯤ ꯗꯦꯕꯤ) was a Meitei lady from Sylhet in modern day Assam. She and her brother Moirangthem Shovananda (Meitei: ꯃꯣꯏꯔꯥꯡꯊꯦꯝ ꯁꯣꯚꯥꯅꯟꯗ) or Sevananda (Meitei: ꯁꯦꯚꯥꯅꯟꯗ) came to Agartala with the help of Ishanchandra Manikya, her future husband. They lived at Dholeswar. Later, she was married to Tripuri King Ishan Chandra Manikya (1849–1862). She constructed a temple of Hindu deities, Lakshmi Narayana at Dholeswar. During her era, with the help of her nephew, Babu Moirangthem Babuni (Meitei: ꯕꯥꯕꯨ ꯃꯣꯏꯔꯥꯡꯊꯦꯝ ꯕꯥꯕꯨꯅꯤ), a renowned musician, the traditional Meitei Rasa dance was introduced in the cultural landscape of Tripura kingdom.

=== Queen Keisam Chanu Jatiswari Devi ===
Keisam Chanu Jatiswari Devi (Meitei: ꯀꯩꯁꯥꯝ ꯆꯅꯨ ꯖꯥꯇꯤꯁ꯭ꯋꯔꯤ ꯗꯦꯕꯤ) was a queen of Tripuri King Ishan Chandra Manikya (1849–1862). She was the mother of Maharajkumar Navadipbahadur, father of Indian famous musician, Sachin Deb Barman.

=== Queen Khumanthem Chanu Chandreswari Devi ===
Khumanthem Chanu Chandreswari Devi (Meitei: ꯈꯨꯃꯟꯊꯦꯝ ꯆꯅꯨ ꯆꯟꯗ꯭ꯔꯦꯁ꯭ꯋꯔꯤ ꯗꯦꯕꯤ) was one of the three Meitei queen consorts of Tripuri King Ishan Chandra Manikya (1849–1862). She was less popular in comparison to the other two Meitei queens of her time.

=== Queen Ningthem Chanu Bhanumati ===
Ningthem Chanu Bhanumati (Meitei: ꯅꯤꯡꯊꯦꯝ ꯆꯅꯨ ꯚꯥꯅꯨꯃꯇꯤ) was a daughter of Rajkumar Kulendrajit (Meitei: ꯔꯥꯖꯀꯨꯃꯥꯔ ꯀꯨꯂꯦꯟꯗ꯭ꯔꯖꯤꯠ), a Meitei royal scion. She was the most favorite queen of Tripuri King Birchandra Manikya (1862-1896). She was the sister of Rajkumar Ranadhwaj (Meitei: ꯔꯥꯖꯀꯨꯃꯥꯔ ꯔꯅꯙ꯭ꯋꯖ), one of the influential ministers of the Tripuri king. She had a premature death which immensely made the king sad. The king became weak and he tried to console himself by reading Rabindranath Tagore's work "Bhagnahriday" (transl. broken heart). King Birchandra wrote many poems in memory of Queen Bhanumati.

=== Panganbam Chanu Rajeswari ===
Panganbam Chanu Rajeswari (Meitei: ꯄꯥꯡꯒꯟꯕꯝ ꯆꯅꯨ ꯔꯥꯖꯦꯁ꯭ꯋꯔꯤ), also known as Kaboklei (Meitei: ꯀꯕꯣꯛꯂꯩ), was the second queen of Tripuri King Birchandra Manikya (1862-1896). She was the mother of Radhakishore Manikya, the successive ruler of Tripura kingdom. A village named "Rajeswaripur" (after her name "Rajeswari") was established in her honour. She introduced Lai Haraoba (Meitei: ꯂꯥꯏ ꯍꯔꯥꯎꯕ), a traditional Meitei festival, for the first time in Tripura. She also built the temple of "Sri Sri Radhamadhab" at Dholeswar. She also constructed the temple of Lainingthou Pakhangba (Meitei: ꯂꯥꯏꯅꯤꯡꯊꯧ ꯄꯥꯈꯪꯕ) at Banamalipur.

=== Queen Khuman Chanu Manmohini ===
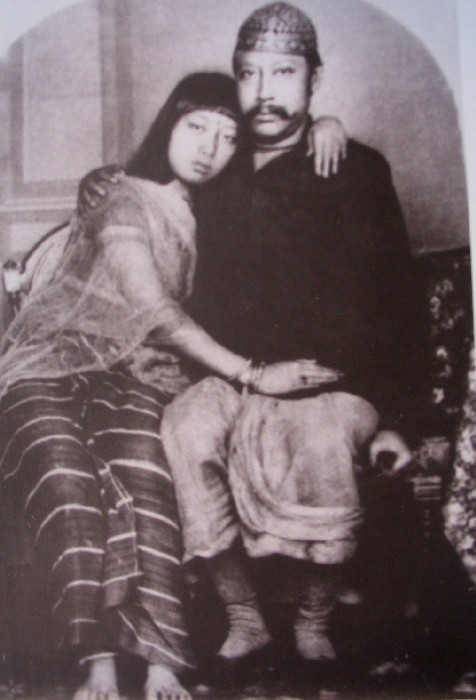
Meitei Lady Khuman Chanu Manmohini Devi, the queen of Tripura, with her husband, Bir Chandra Manikya, the king of Tripura

Khuman Chanu Manmohini (Meitei: ꯈꯨꯃꯟ ꯆꯅꯨ ꯃꯟꯃꯣꯍꯤꯅꯤ ꯗꯦꯕꯤ) was the daughter of Meitei Queen Bhanumati‘s sister. She was only 13 years when she was married to Tripuri King Birchandra Manikya (1862-1896), who was her uncle. She built a temple and a pavilion near the present day ISKCON temple in Tripura.

=== Queen Ratnamanjuri ===
Ratnamanjuri (Meitei: ꯔꯇ꯭ꯅꯃꯟꯖꯨꯔꯤ), also known as Dhaka Rani (Meitei: ꯙꯥꯀꯥ ꯔꯥꯅꯤ), was a Meitei lady from Bengal (in present day Bangladesh). She was a queen of Tripuri King Radhakishore Manikya (1896–1909), the son of a Meitei queen. 1874, when Radhakishore was a prince, his father, King Birchandra Manikya went to Dhaka to meet British Governor Northbrook. On the way, he met Meitei King Debendra Singh (Meitei: ꯅꯤꯡꯊꯧ ꯗꯦꯕꯦꯟꯗ꯭ꯔ ꯁꯤꯡꯍ) in Dhaka. Birchandra Manikya saw Princess Ratnamanjuri, the daughter of the Meitei king. He was charmed by the princess' beauty that he wanted to make her his daughter-in-law. Afterwards, princess Ratnamanjuri came to Agartala and married crown prince Radhakishore. As she came from Dhaka, she was also known as Dhaka Rani, among the Meitei people in Tripura. Queen Ratnamanjuri was the mother of the successive Tripuri King Birendrakishore Manikya.

=== Queen Tulshibati ===
Tulshibati (Meitei: ꯇꯨꯜꯁꯤꯕꯇꯤ) first queen of Tripuri King Radhakishore Manikya (1896–1909), the son of a Meitei queen. She was a daughter of a farmer from the village of Tarou (Nalgoriya) located far from Agartala. She was a kind social worker. She was known for her contributions to the development of the society of Tripura kingdom. She was credited for pioneering women's education in Tripura. She established the first girls' school in Tripura. It was "Maharani Tulshibati Balika Vidyalaya", located in Agartala. In 1905, she established a separate woman cell at the Victoria Memorial Hospital (now known as I.G.M) in Agartala. A market was established in her honor and was named as "Ranirbazar". She was not educated but was good in compositions of songs and poems. She also built a temple of "Sri Sri Radhamadhad" at Nalgaria and a temple dedicated to "Lainingthou Puthiba" (Meitei: ꯂꯥꯏꯅꯤꯡꯊꯧ ꯄꯨꯊꯤꯕ) at Abhoynagar. Moreover, she constructed temples in almost all the Meitei villages of Tripura such as Bishalgarh, Bamutia, Murabari, Daccabari etc. She also offered rent-free lands to the public for the construction of the temples and pavilions. She introduced the plantation of basil plants to the Tripuri royal palace, as its leaves were important religious offerings to deities.

=== Queen Monomanjuri ===
Monomanjuri (Meitei: ꯃꯣꯅꯣꯃꯟꯖꯨꯔꯤ) was one of the three Meitei queens of Tripuri King Radhakishore Manikya (1896–1909), the son of a Meitei queen. She was less popular in comparison to the other two Meitei queens of her time.

== Royal consorts ==
In addition to the queens (termed as "Maharani"), there were also simple royal consorts (termed as "Rani") from Meitei community (Manipuri ethnicity) in the kingdom of Tripura.

- Tripuri King Birendrakishore Manikya (1909-1923) married ten Meitei ladies. However, none of them were given the status of Maharanis (queens).
- Tripuri King Birbikramkishore had three Meitei wives out of his seven wives. However, they were kept as simple Ranis and not Maharanis.

== See also ==
- Meitei people in Tripura
- Meitei people in Assam
- Meitei people in Bangladesh
- Meitei people in Meghalaya
- Meitei people in Myanmar

== Bibliography ==
- Singha, Sri Rajkumar Kamaljit., (edited) ― Marup, Sharat ki Echel, 1980, 12th Edition, Agartala, 1980.
- Singha, Sri Rajkumar Kamaljit., (edited) ― Marup, Sharat ki Echel, 1981, 13th Edition, Agartala, 1981.
- Takhel Lairang, 14th edition, Manipuri Sahitya Parishad, Tripura, Dec. 2011.
- Adhikari, Udainarayan., ― Social – Cultural Relations Among States in Pre – Independence India, A Study of Tripura & Manipur, Akansha Publishing House, New Delhi, 2010.
- Bhattacharyya, A.C., ― Progressive Tripura, Tribal Research and Cultural Institute, (reprint), Govt. of Tripura, 2012.
- Bihari, Nepram., ― The Cheitharol Kumbaba, The Royal Chronicle of Manipur, Spectrum publications, Guwahati, 2012.
- Dun, Captain, E.W., ― Gazetteer of Manipur, Vivek Publishing House, Delhi, 1981.
- Goswami, Dr. Dwijendra Narayan., ― Rajarshi Bhagya Chandra, Akkhar Publication, Agartala, 2002.
- Goswami, Dr. D.N. & Dr. Debbarman., ― Tripura State Administration Report (1904-05, 1906-07, 1907-08), Tribal Research and Cultural Institute, Govt. of Tripura, 2007.
- Khelchandra, N., & Ibungohal, L., ― Cheitharol Kumbaba, Sahitya Parishad, Imphal, 1989.
- Kabui, Gangmumei., ― History of Manipur, vol-I, Pre-Colonial Period, National Publishing House, New Delhi, (3rd edi.), 2011.
- Nath, Dr. N.C., ― Sri Rajmala, Vol-I to IV, (Translated), Tribal Research Institute, Govt. of Tripura, Agartala, 1999.
- Sen, Sri Kaliprasanna., (edited) ― Sri Rajmala, Vol-I, II, III, IV, Upajati Sanskriti Gobeshana Kendra, Govt. of Tripura, 2003.
- Singha, Sri Kailashchandra., ― Rajmala Ba Tripurar Itihas, Akkhar Publication, Agartala, 1405 Bangabda.
- Singha, L. Birmangal, & Ray, Pannalal., ― Itihaser Aloke Tripura – Manipur, Itihaski Mityengdagi Tripura - Manipur, Akkhar Publication, 2007.
- Singh, W. Ibohal., ― The History of Manipur (An Early Period), Manipur Commercial Co., Imphal, 1986.
- Sanajaoba, Naorem., ― Manipur Past and Present, vol-IV, Mittal publications, 2005.
- Singha, G.P., ― Researches into the History and Civilization of the Kiratas, New Delhi.
