= Hijam Irabot =

Freedom fighter, social activist and politician from Manipur

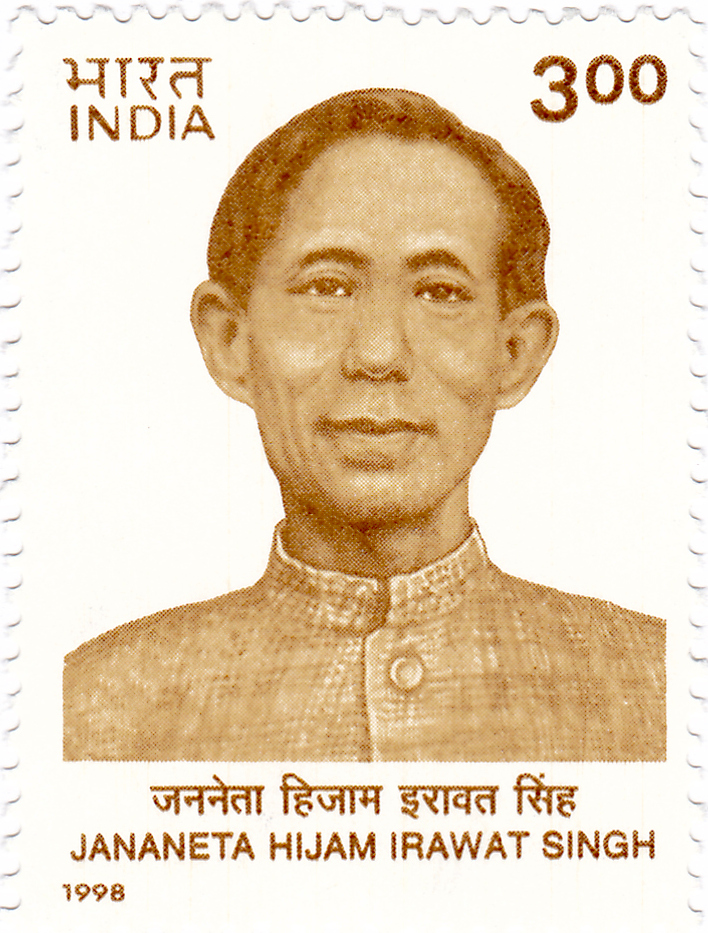
Hijam Irabot on a 1998 stamp of India

Hijam Irabot (30 September 1896 – 26 September 1951), also known as Jana Neta (Meeyamgi Luchingba in Manipuri) Hijam Irabot, was a politician and leader of Communist party of India and revolutionary social activist from Manipur. He fought against the social evils of the society. He later was jailed for supporting the second Nupi Lan demonstration in 1939 led by women in Manipur, British India against the colonial authorities. In the June/July 1948 election to the Manipur Assembly, Irabot won from the Utlou Constituency.

== Early life ==
Irabot was born to Hijam Ibungohal Singh and Chongtham Ningol Thambalngambi at Pishum Thong Oinam Leikai. After his father's death, he moved with his mother to stay with his aunt at Moirangkhom Sougaijam leikai. He studied at Johnstone Higher Secondary School, Imphal, Manipur (still existing, located at the Western side of the Kangla Fort), till Class 7 and founded two student bodies, Bal Sangha and Chhatra Sanmelan. In 1913, he went to Dhaka with his cousin, Sawaijam Somorendro and was admitted to Pugoj High School to study till Class 9. In 1915, he dropped out due to insufficient funds and went to Agartala.

Later that year, when he came back to Manipur, he found that his mother had died. He stayed with a friend in Wangkhei Ningthem Pukhri Mapal called (Maibam Iboton Singh), a renowned Polo player whose father Maibam Samden Singh worked in the Manipur State Durbar of Meidingngu Churachand as Additional Darbar Member.It was then that he came in good relations with the royal family. He married the king's elder brother's daughter Khomdonsana. He was then appointed a member of the Sadar panchayat.

== Political life, 1934–1938 ==
Originally known as the Nikhil Manipuri Hindu Mahasabha, the Nikhil Manipuri Mahasabha was founded under the patronage of Maharaja Churachand Singh who was the president of the organisation. All works were carried out by Hijam Irabot who was the vice-president. Under Irabot's guidance, four sessions were held. In the last one at Chinga, during Maharaja Churachand's absence, Irabot changed the name of the sabha by dropping Hindu off the original name. He transformed it into a political party. Maharaja Churachand sent a warning to Irabot on the events taking place in his absence.

Irabot and Elangbam Tompok, a clerk at the revenue department resigned from the Sadar Panchayat. They outlined a legislature which was submitted to the king and the Manipur State Durbar. It was rejected.

== Political life, 1939–1951 ==
This phase could be termed as the socio-reformer phase. In 1939, when the 2nd Nupi lan broke out in Manipur, a section of the NMM called the Praja Sanmelani split off the original party to join the struggle. Irabot headed this party and gave a speech at the Police lane in 1940. He was arrested and deported to the Silhet Jail (Sylhet, in Bangladesh present days).

At the jail, he met Indian communist leaders like Hemanga Biswas and Jyotirmoy Nandi. He was greatly influenced by them. Irabot was released from the Sylhet jail on 20 March 1943. But he was not permitted to enter Manipur. He stayed in Cachar district to work among the Manipuri peasants and also among the non-Manipuri ex tea garden workers. There he joined the Kisan movements. He kept in touch with the communist leaders and attended the first Party congress of the Communist party of India that was held at Bombay from 23 May to 1 June 1943 as a special invitee from Cachar. In Cachar he organised cultural squads known as Swadesh Ganer Dal, which was later on incorporated in the Indian People's Theatre Association. He led a delegation from Cachar to the All India Kisan Sabha session held at Netra Kona in Mymensingh District of Bengal. In March 1944, he went to Bejwada (Katakual Village) to join the Kisan Conference and stayed for sometime at the Bengal Communist Party office. The same year he went to Sylhet to join the annual session of the Surma valley provisional Kisan Sabha.

Irabot was detained as a security prisoner in the Silchar District jail with effect from 15 September 1944 on the charge that he was a communist. He was released on 10 January 1945. After more than 5 years of political exile, Irabot was given permission to stay in Manipur for a week (from 2 to 10 September 1945). His request for an extension of his stay in Manipur was denied.

He came back to Cachar and carried out peasants' movement. He was appointed General Secretary of the Cachar District Kishan Sabha and President of the Surma Valley Kishan Sabha. He was instrumental in the establishment of the Assam Kisha Sabha, the CPI Assam Provincial Committee, and the Assam Students' Federation. He contested in the 1946 election to the Assam Provincial Legislatures Assembly from the Silchar constituency as a CPI candidate, but lost by a narrow margin.

Irabot was finally permitted to enter Manipur in March 1946. In Manipur he organised a new party called the Manipur Praja Mandal in April 1946. He attended two sessions of the Nikhil Manipuri Mahasabha before he was expelled from the membership of the Working Committee of the Mahasabha on the charge of being a member of the Communist Party of India. He attended the second congress of the CPI held at Calcutta from 28 Feb to 6 March 1948. The first Communist Party of Manipur was formed on 23 August 1948. In the June/ July 1948 election to the Manipur Assembly, Irabot contested and won under from the Utlou Constituency as a Krishak Sabha candidate. Before the inauguration of the Assembly, Irabot on behalf of the Manipur Praja Sangha and Manipur Krishak sabha called a meeting at the M.D.U Hall on 21 September 1948, to protest against the formation of Purbachal Pradesh, composed of Manipur, Tripura, Cachar and Lushai Hills.

A scuffle took place at Pungdongbam when the Manipur State Police prevented a group of citizens who came to attend the meeting in which a police officer was killed on the spot. The Manipur state council declared the Manipur Praja Sangha and Manipur Krishak Sabha unlawful. The state officials declined to constitute an Enquiry Committee to investigate the Pungdongbam incident.

Irabot could not attend the first meeting of the Manipur Legislative Assembly held on 18 October 1948 because of the warrant against him. Irabot formed an underground Communist Party of Manipur on 29 October 1948 and carried out armed struggle against the government. He died on 26 September 1951 at the foothills of the Anggo Hills.
