= Bodhchandra Singh =

Maharaja of Manipur from 1941 to 1949

- Maharaja
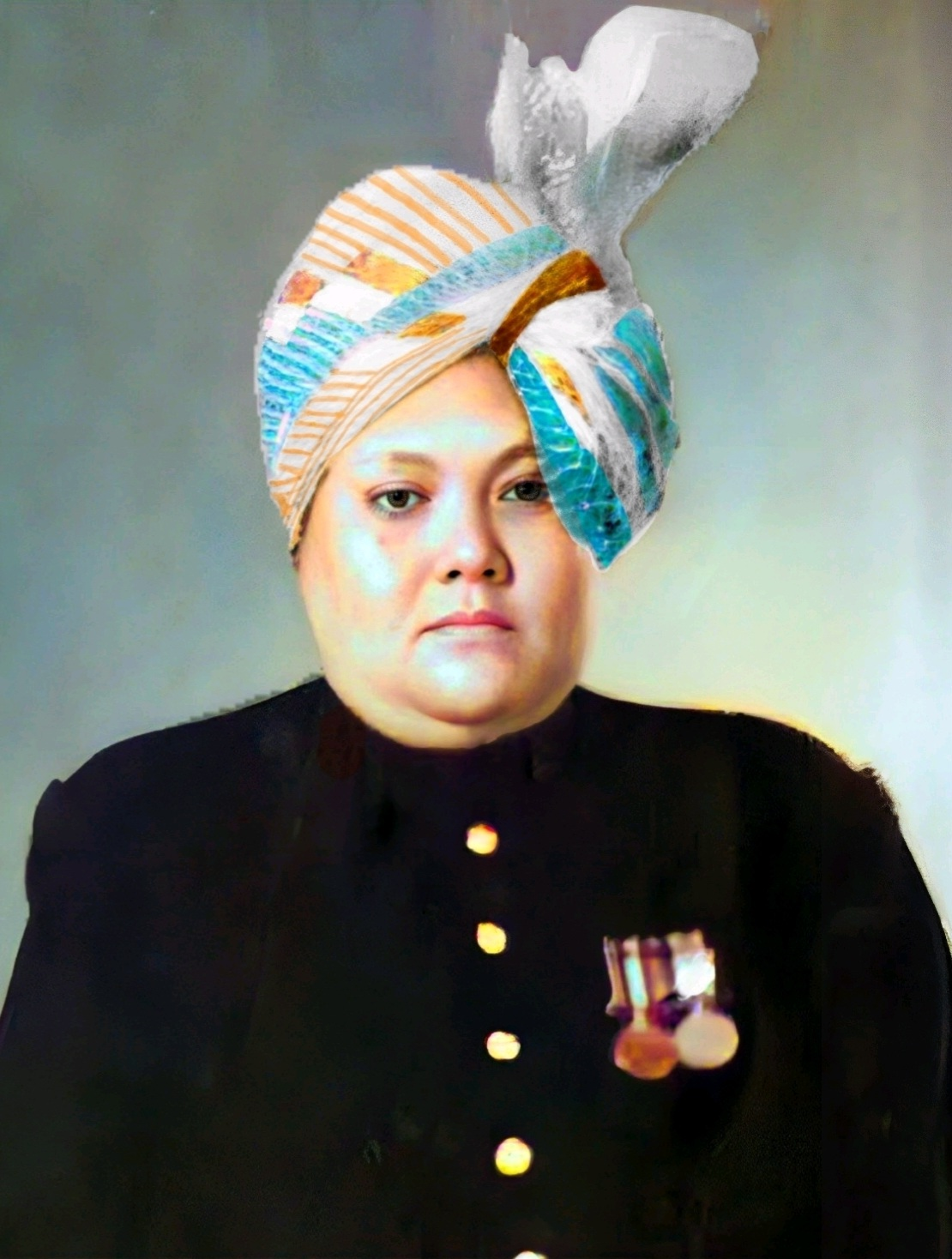
- Bodhachandra Singh
- Reign: 1941–1949
- Predecessor: Churachand Singh
- Successor: Okendrajit Singh
- Born: 24 July 1908; Imphal, Kingdom of Manipur, British India
- Died: 9 December 1955 (aged 47); Imphal, Manipur, India
- Consort: Iswari Devi
- Issue: Okendrajit Singh
- House: Ningthouja dynasty
- Father: Churachand Singh
- Religion: Hinduism

Maharaja Bodhchandra Singh or Bodhachandra Singh (1908–1955) was the last ruler of the princely state of Manipur under the British Raj as well as the Dominion of India. He ruled between 1941 and 15 October 1949. During his term, India was decolonised by the British, receiving independence on 15 August 1947. The Maharaja presided over a transition to democracy, passing the Manipur State Constitution Act 1947, and he signed an Instrument of Accession with India on 11 August 1947. The Instrument of Accession was strictly a federal arrangement and not absolute merger; hence, the state of Manipur retained its domestic powers. In 1949, a few months before India became a republic, the Maharaja signed a merger agreement, whereby Manipur became an integral part of India governed by the Constitution of India. He was granted a privy purse of Rs.300,000 per annum.

== Life ==
Bodhchandra Singh was born to Maharaja Churachand Singh, the ruler of Manipur installed by the British Raj in 1891. He was born to the second queen of Churchand Singh on 24 July 1908. He was educated at Rajkumar College, Raipur between ages 12 and 20. He was joined by his younger brother Priyobrata Singh at the college.

He married Rajkumari Tharendra Kishori (later known as Rajkumari Ram Priya Devi), a daughter of the Raja of Bodo Khimedi, in 1929. He divorced her in 1941, and subsequently married Iswari Devi, daughter of Prince Ramaraja of Ramnagar, who was a cousin of the King of Nepal.

== Succession ==
The Maharaja retained his title for his lifetime and passed it on to his son and heir Okendrajit Singh. Afterwards, in 1971, under the 26th Constitutional Amendment, the royal titles were abolished by the Indian Parliament.

== See also ==
- List of Manipuri kings

== Bibliography ==
- Choudhury, Samrat (2023), Northeast India: A Political History, Hurst, ISBN 9781787389526
  - Choudhury, Samrat (2023), Northeast India: A Political History, Hurst, ISBN 9781805261070 (ebook)
- Reid, Robert (1997) [1942], History of the Frontier Areas Bordering on Assam, From 1883–1941, Guwahati: Spectrum Publications – via archive.org

| Preceded by Churachandra Singh | King of Manipur; 1941–May 1949 | Succeeded by (Monarchy abolished) |
