= Nikhil Manipuri Mahasabha =

Hindu organisation

Nikhil Manipuri Mahasabha, initially called Nikhil Hindu Manipuri Mahasabha, was founded in Manipur in 1934 with Churachand Singh, a ruler of the Manipur princely state, as its president.
