= Ima Market =

Market in Imphal West, Manipur, India

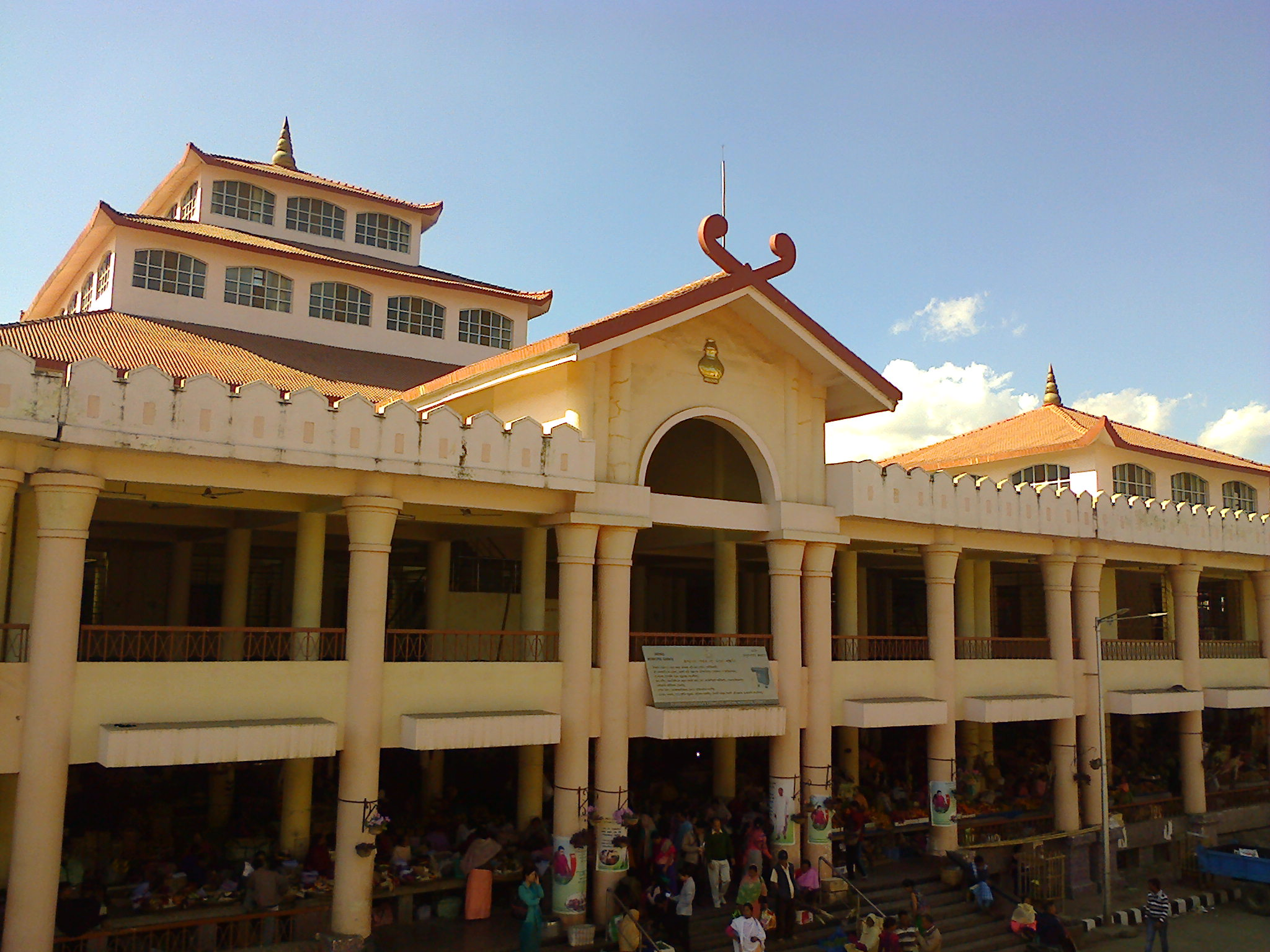
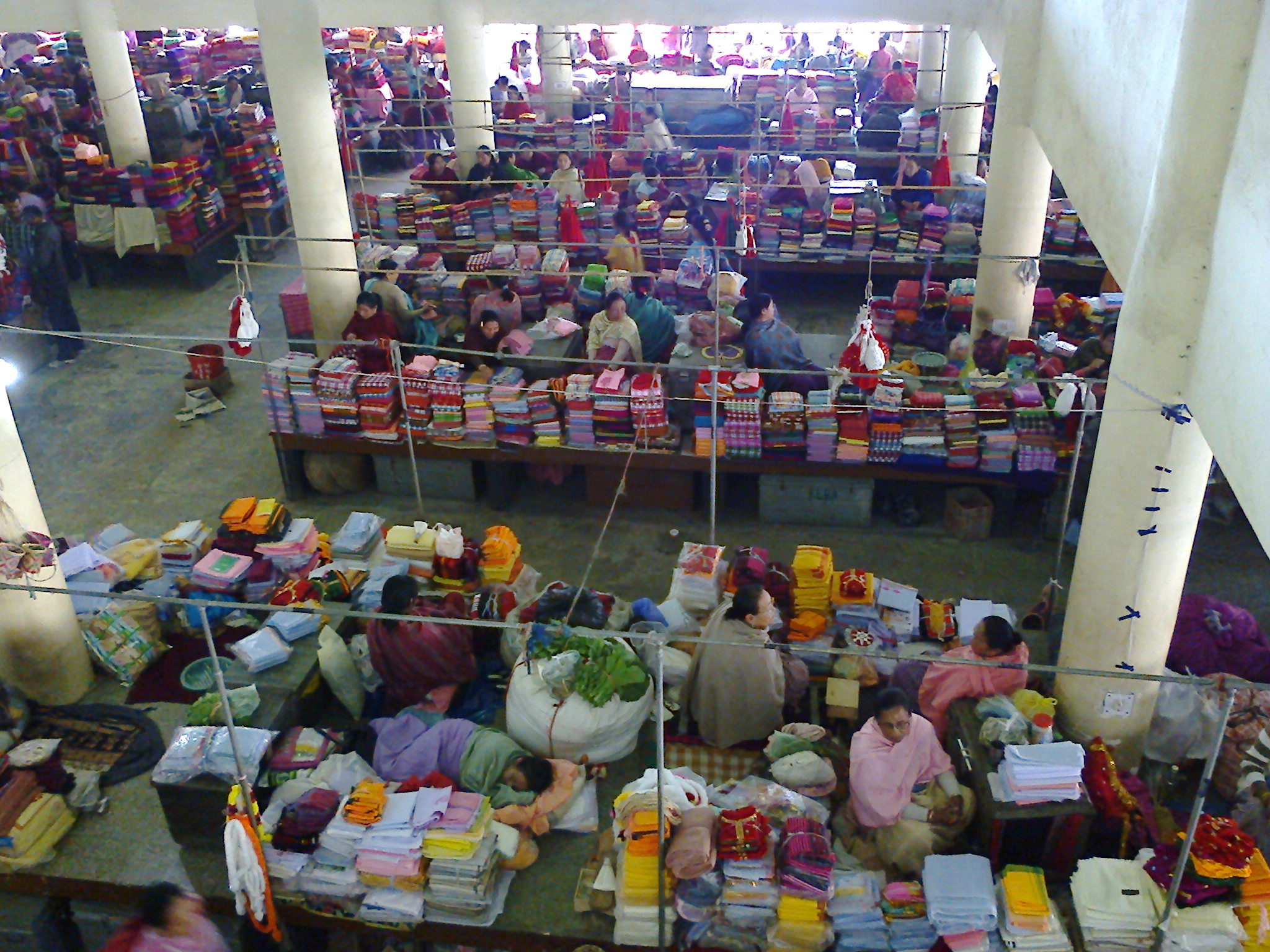
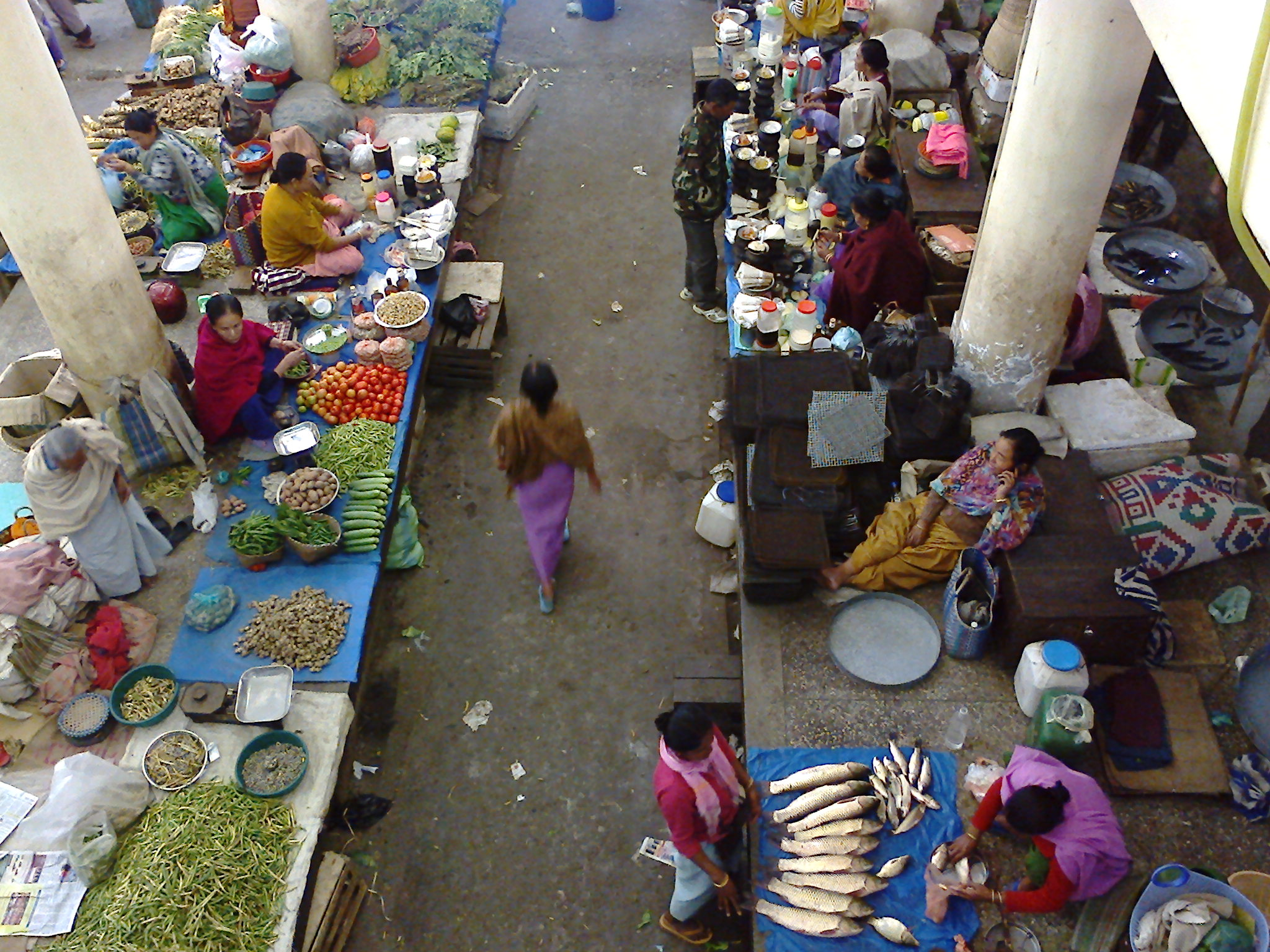
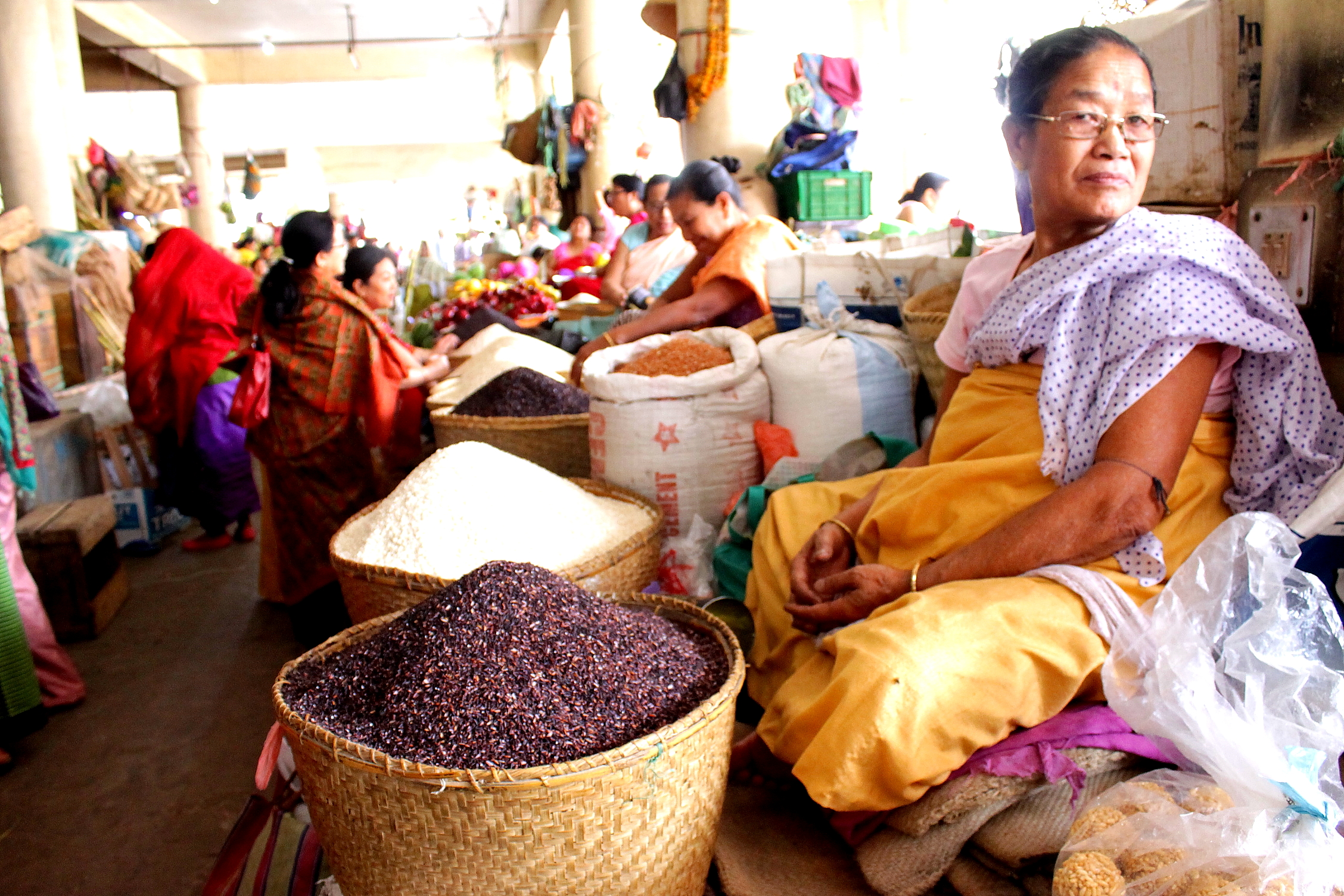
- Different scenes of the Ima Market
- Location: ? Street, Imphal, Imphal West district, Manipur, 795001; Imphal; 24.808°N 93.935°E
- Developer: Municipal Administration, Housing and Urban Development (MAHUD)
- Management: Ima Keithel Union
- Owner: Government of Manipur
- Number of tenants: ~5000 women
- Interactive map of Ima Market

The Ima Market (Meitei: Ima Keithel; literally, Mothers' Market), also known as the Nupi Keithel (English: Women's Market) or the Khwairamband Keithel (English: Khwairamband Market), is a women-only market in the middle of Imphal in the Indian state of Manipur. The market hosts around 5,000–6,000 women vendors who sell a variety of products, such as vegetables, fruits, textiles, toys, fish, spices and utensils. It is a popular tourist attraction in the state of Manipur as the largest all-women market in Asia.

== History ==
The market was established in the 16th century following the imposition of the labour system, lallup-kaba in 1533 CE. The lallup-kaba was a forced labour system in Manipur Kingdom which required male members of the Meitei ethnicity to work in distant lands or to serve in the army. As a consequence of the system, women had to support their households by cultivating their fields or weaving textiles and then selling the products on improvised markets. The improvised markets led to the formation of the organized Ima Keithel. The Ima Keithel was the primary permanent market in Manipur until the 20th century.

In 1891, the British colonial administration attempted to impose economic and political reform in Manipur Kingdom, which disrupted the functioning of the market. The reforms involved large scale seizure and export of food corps from Manipur without consideration for local requirements which caused starvation at times of Mautam. It led to agitations by the women of the Ima Keithel and in response, the British attempted to sell off the assets and properties of Ima Keithel to foreigners and external buyers. This, among other causes, resulted in the Nupi Lan or the women's war, which eventually seized with the Japanese invasion of India.

Following independence, the market regained prominence as a commercial center and a hub of socio-political discussions. In 2010, the market was moved into the Khawairamband Bazaar complex constructed by the Municipal Corporation of Imphal. The complex had sustained damaged in the 2016 Imphal earthquake, which effected the livelihood of around 800 vendors.

== Market ==
The Ima Keithel is located in the Khawairamband Bazaar Complex reconstructed on the site of Purana Bazaar in central Imphal. It is located west of Kangla Fort and on the Bir Tikendrajit Road in the Thangal Bazar locality. The complex consists of three large buildings with pagoda styled roofs. The market is split into two sections on either side of the road. Two buildings are located to the north of the main road and one to the south. Leimarel Shidabi Ima, or Purana Bazar, is the oldest and largest structure in the complex and Emoinu Ima Keithel, or Laxmi Bazar is the smallest structure in the complex, both are located to the north of main road. Phouoibi Ima Keithel, or the New Market, mainly sells handloom items, especially Meitei traditional clothes, that includes various phaneks, handwoven sarees, and inaphi, is located to the south of the road. The buildings are segregated into textile housing sections and household groceries sections. There is also a section of stalls under a large tin and tarp arrangement market to the east of the main buildings. In order to set up stalls in the main buildings of the market, an annual municipal fees is levied. The fee of a 16 square feet (1.5 m^{2}) stall was ₹140,000 per annum at the time of construction in 2010. There is a licensing system in place for vendors with stalls. The market houses around 5000–6000 women vendors at any given day. As of 2017, the vendors at the market make an annual profit between ₹73,000 and ₹200,000. The annual turnover of the market was estimated to be between ₹40–50 Crore.

== Management ==
The market is managed by a union of all the vendors of the market. It maintains a custom of only allowing women who have been married at least once to set up stalls. The women vendors include those who are divorced or have been widowed in the insurgency in Manipur. To be able to sell in the market, a new woman vendor needs to be referred by a retiring vendor. The vendors are primarily in the age of 45–70 years. The union also runs a credit system for lending to women traders.

Inside the market, male shopkeepers and vendors are not allowed to sell anything. The Government of Manipur also announced that the male shopkeepers and vendors will be punished if their shops and vendors are found inside the market.

Currently, Ima Mema Laishram and Ima Y Ibeyaima are the convenors of Khwairamband Ima Keithel Joint Coordinating Committee for Peace. Asem Nirmala is the General Secretary of Khwairamband Ima Keithel Lukmai Sellup.

== Compliments ==
Minister of External Affairs of India, S Jaishankar called Ima market a "great example of nari shakti (women's power) powering economic growth."

In February 2023, delegates of B20 from the G20 forum visited the Ima Market. One of the delegates said, "I will tell the world that there is a beautiful market run by women that sells authentic handicrafts, clothes and others."

== See also ==
- Meira Paibi
