= Meira Paibi =

Indian women's social movement

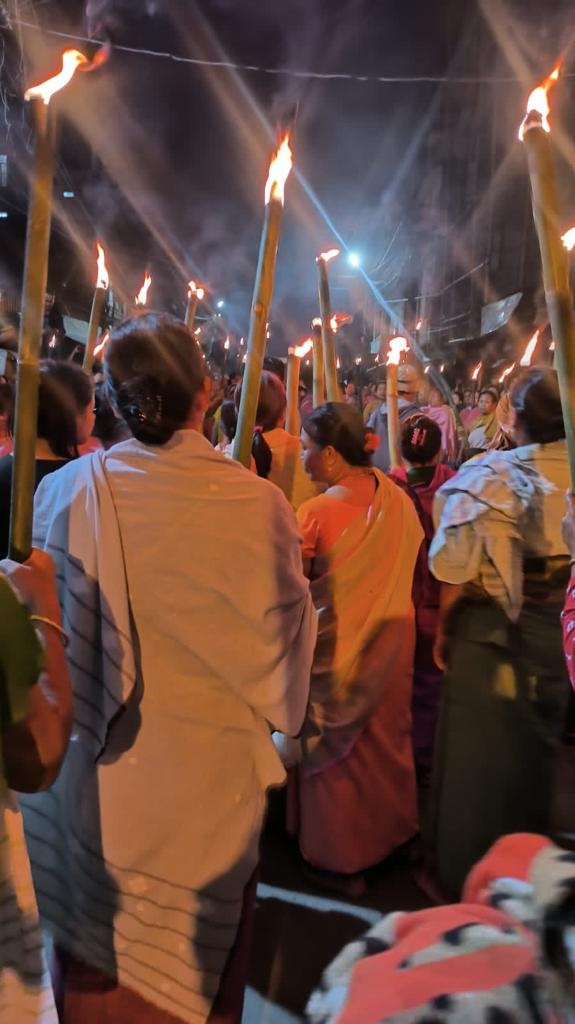
Meira Paibis of Manipur prepare to take out a night march.

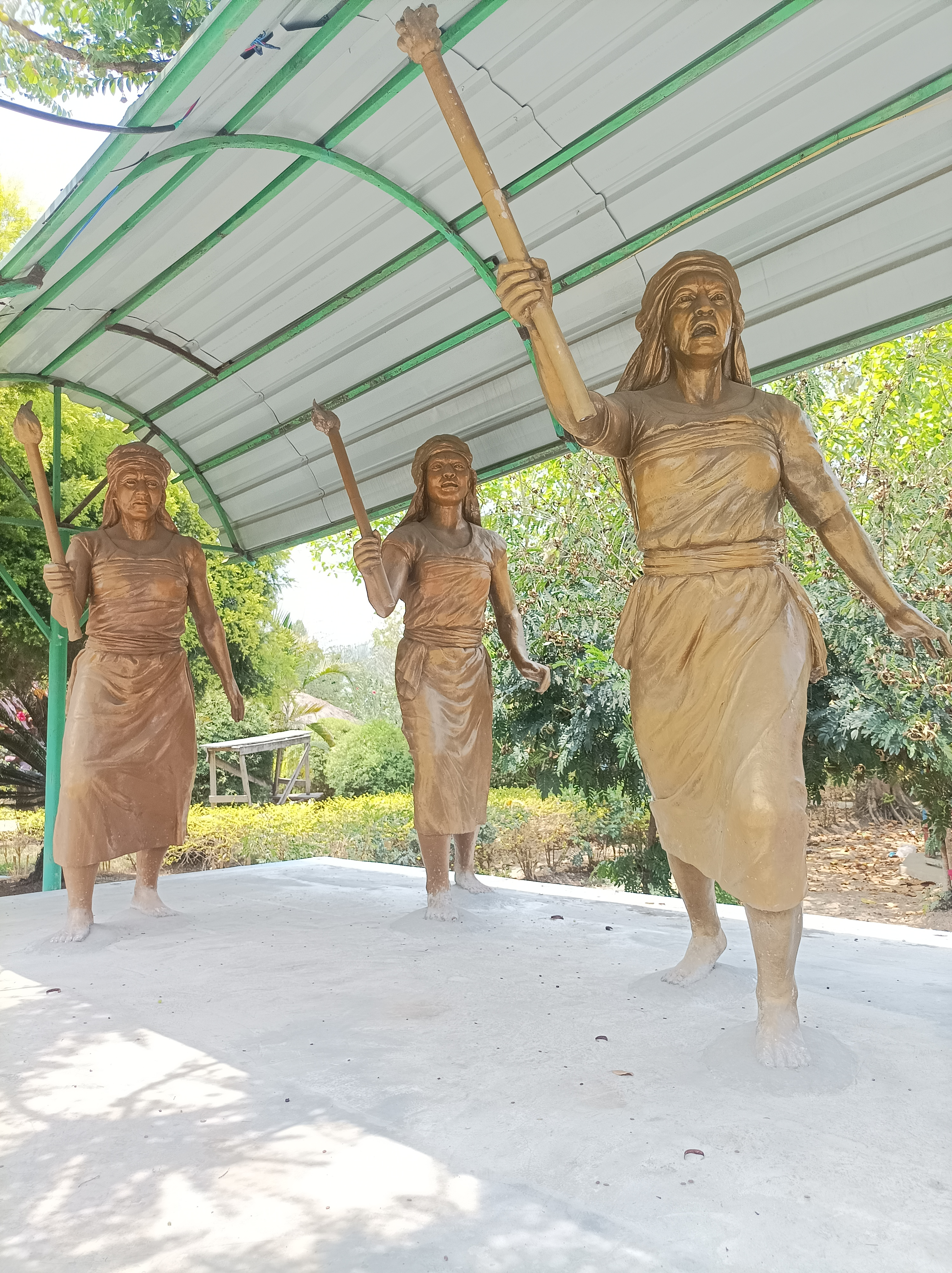
Statues of Meira Paibis, the Meitei women holding flaming torches, installed in the MMRC and Unity Park, Khangabok, Thoubal.

Meira Paibi (Women torch bearers) is a Meitei women's social movement in the Indian state of Manipur. Referred to as the "guardians of civil society", Meira Paibi dates to 1977 in present Kakching district. It derives its name from the flaming torches which the women carry while marching through city streets, often at night. They do so both as a patrol, and in protest, seeking redress against human rights violations committed by paramilitary and armed forces units against the innocent. Contextualized, Meira Paibi was founded at a time when the people of Manipur were fighting for self-determination, political autonomy, and independence.

According to The Times of India, Meira Paibi is the "largest grassroots, civilian movement fighting state atrocities and human rights violations in Manipur". One of the movement's leaders, A. K. Janaki Leima, says that "We've been fighting against drug abuse, crimes against women, and the Armed Forces Special Powers Act (AFSPA). We will continue to fight these."

== Background ==
Women's social movements in Manipur date to British rule. Two such movements, collectively known as Nupi lan (Women's War; Women's Uprising), preceded Meira Paibi. The first one dates to 1904 when women of the Imphal valley protested against the Assistant Superintendent of British authority in Manipur because of his directive to collect teak wood from Kabas to build his house. The women who protested were neighbors in the locality. British authorities brought forces from outside the state to end this women's protest. A second movement occurred in 1939 as a protest to forced rice exportation, which was causing starvation among the local people. Women, nearly 99% of them, protested peacefully, submitting a petition to the Durbar (government authority). The movement forced the closure of rice mills and eventually proved successful in halting the exportation of rice. Nupi Lan became the forerunner in introducing reforms in the State after World War II. 12 December is observed annually by Meira Paibi as "Women's War Day" commemorating the events of 1939.

The Nisha Bandis women's movement developed in the late 1970s. Its origins are attributed to Meitei women's activism combating alcoholism and drug addiction. The women held night marches in the streets of Imphal and elsewhere in Manipur carrying lanterns, chastising the intoxicated, and setting fire to liquor shops. Their actions lead to the introduction of prohibition laws in the state. The late 1970s was a period of civil unrest, which established an underground insurgency movement in Manipur. The Armed Forces Special Powers (Assam and Manipur) Act 1958 permitted paramilitary forces and the police to use unlimited power in dealing with insurgency, resulting in the arrest, torture, and deaths of many innocent young people. The Nisha Bandis became socially active with vigilante activities, protests and marches through the streets of Imphal and elsewhere in the state.

The Nisha Bandis carried podons (large-wicked kerosene lamps) and laltain (Hindi, lantern) but after switching to flaming torches, they became known as Meira Paibi.

== Establishment ==
"The Manipuri story indicates that active participation by women in public affairs can and does contribute to better conditions for children and society at large". -UNICEF

Meira Paibi was established in 1977 in Kakching, kakching district, Manipur, India. Its women activists carry flaming torches and march through city streets, frequently at night doing a patrol duty, and as a way of protest for seeking redress against human rights violations committed by paramilitary and armed forces units against the innocent. The movement evolved at a time when the people of Manipur were fighting for self-determination, political autonomy, and independence.

== Activities ==
The Meitei women torch bearers represented the declaration of a just war defending human rights in Manipur. Their movement has expanded to hold "public meetings, demonstrations, road closures and public bandhs or shut down of all essential services, hunger strikes and mass rallies." These women, also known as "women vigilantes", stopped army vehicles, rescued innocent youth who were apprehended on false charges, and negotiated their transfer to the police. The Army did not protest as they respected the role of Meitei women in just causes. The Meira Paibi's movement has become known as the third Nupi Lan.

=== Role in 2023 Manipur violence ===
The Quint alleged that Meira Paibis played an active role in instigating Meitei mobs to commit atrocities against Zo people, during the violence in Manipur. On 24 June 2023, more than 1,200 Meira Paibi activists blocked an Indian Army convoy in Itham village of Manipur's Imphal East district, which was carrying 12 cadres of Kanglei Yawol Kanna Lup, a banned militant group, in order to force their release. On 21 July 2023, an 18-year-old woman was abducted and gang-raped in Imphal East. The victim alleged that a group of Meira Paibis women were responsible for handing her over to four armed men, who committed the act. In an interview with Karan Thapar, two Kuki survivors accused that Meira Paibis instigated men to rape Kuki women. The role of Meira Paibi's in violence against Kuki women was also reported in The Caravan.

Meira Paibis of Nongpok Sekmai in Toubal district claimed that they rescued the two Kuki women, along with three more families from the Kuki community. The Meira Paibis burned down the houses of two of the accused, soon after their arrests.

On 19 June 2023, hundreds of Meira Paibis protested at Jantar Mantar in New Delhi because "they felt that the Indian government has remained deaf and mute to the crisis in Manipur". They submitted a memorandum to the Prime Minister of India.

On 7 August 2023, thousands of Meira Paibis staged protests against Assam Rifles in five districts alleging that "the para military force had unleashed atrocities on the Meitei people and demanded their withdrawal from the state."

On 9 August 2023, the Meira Paibis submitted a memorandum to the Prime Minister of India via Manipur Governor, Anusuiya Uikey, highlighting "alleged atrocities and unwarranted excessive brutalities committed against them". The Meira Paibis alleged that the central and para military forces posted in the affected areas of the conflict remain silent spectators.

On 12 August 2023, The Meira Paibis organised a sit-in protest against the alleged gang rape of a 37-year-old woman in Churachandpur in early May 2023.Thousands of women participated in the protest across five valley districts of Manipur.

On 12 September 2023, in a press conference in New Delhi, the Meira Paibis said that they didn't recognise the legitimacy of buffer zones set up by the Central and State governments in Manipur. They demanded the replacement of Assam Rifles and other central security forces in Manipur with other units. The buffer zones, defended by the central security forces, divided the Kuki-dominated hill districts and Meitei-dominated valley districts.

On 30 August 2023, the Meira Paibis protested against the Manipur assembly session that was wrapped up in 30 minutes and demanded to reconvene another session.

On 2 September 2023, the Meira Paibis launched a mass civil disobedience movement against the Government.

On 19 September 2023, the Meira Paibis staged protests and called for a 48-hour bandh demanding the release of five people who were arrested three days before for carrying firearms and sporting camouflage uniforms.

On 1 October 2023, Meira Paibis of Thoubal and Kakching districts staged protests condemning the killing of two Meitei students whose photographs surfaced on social media on 25 September.

To make sense of their role in the 2023 violence in Manipur, Manorama Sharma a former professor of history at the North-Eastern Hill University noted Meira Paibi's longer history of local vigilantism. She noted that "There have been instances when they took the law into their own hands before going to the police. With this history behind them, it becomes quite possible to see that they could be violent in mob action when egged on by men."

In an interview to The Wire on 14 September 2023, Aheibam Chanthoisana Chanu, a Meira Paibi leader, said that the Meira Paibis have been mis-reported and mis-interpreted by the media and those providing information to the media, while they are only fighting for peace and waiting for reconciliation in Manipur.

In August 2023, Barkha Dutt met the Meira Paibis in Manipur during their night march and said, "Women have been at the epicenter of the Manipur story, not just as survivors of violence but also at the frontline of protests. Every time there is an issue in Manipur, you have the women coming out carrying their torches to flag the issue they feel strongly about. The women here say they want peace. Discussions should start. Everybody is sleeping. Only the mothers are awake, even at night, carrying their torches. And they are very angry."

== Recognition ==
The Times of India awarded the "TOI Social Impact Awards: Lifetime Contribution" to Meira Paibi and its five leaders, the 83-year-old Thokchom Ramani, Ak Janaki Leima, L Memchoubi Devi, Y Leirik Leima, and Purnimashi Leima. In July 2004, to protest against the rape and custodial killing of Thangjam Manorama by Assam Rifles personnel, these five women, known as "imas" or mothers, along with six other elderly women, protested in front of the Kangla Fort where the Assam Rifles were then stationed, by disrobing themselves and holding a banner that read 'Indian Army Rape Us'.

The Times of India wrote, "She pushes the traditional wraparound or phanek lower, fastens the "khwang chet" cloth as a belt and wraps the traditional "phi" around her. A strip of cloth is made the turban. She grabs her meira, sets it aflame, and becomes a warrior for human rights and peace."

Uday, an organisation that promotes social justice, also recognised the efforts of the Meira Paibis and awarded them.

== Prominent Leaders ==
On 2 October 2023, Meira Paibi leader, Ema Longjam Memchoubi, passed away at Shija Hospital at Langol due to multiple organs failure. She was the president of Poirei Leimarol Meira Paibee Apunba Manipur (PLMPAM). Manipur CM, N Biren Singh said, “Manipur has lost a leader who was at the forefront of many political and social movements. She also took part in voicing the current crisis and remained a true patriot until her last breath.”

== See also ==
- Ima Market

== Bibliography ==
- Karna, Mahendra Narain (1998). Social Movements in North-East India. Indus Publishing. ISBN 978-81-7387-083-5.
- Parratt, John (2005). Wounded Land: Politics and Identity in Modern Manipur. Mittal Publications. ISBN 978-81-8324-053-6.
- Thomas, C. Joshua; Gopalakrishnan, Ramamoorthy; Singh, R. K. Ranjan (2001). Constraints In Development Of Manipur. Regency Publications [for Policy Alternatives for the North-East and Conflict Elimination Awareness]. ISBN 978-81-87498-30-8.
- Thomas, Pradip Ninan (2011). Negotiating Communication Rights: Case Studies from India. SAGE Publications. ISBN 978-81-321-0778-1.
