= Nupi Lan =

Political demonstrations in Manipur, British India

The Nupi Lan were two demonstrations led by women in Manipur, British India, against the colonial authorities. In 1904, the first Nupi Lan broke out in response to an order by the colonial authorities to send Manipuri men to the Kabow Valley to fetch timber for rebuilding the then Police Agent's bungalow. The second Nupi Lan broke out in 1939, in response to the export of rice during the Second World War.

== First Nupi Lan ==
The first Nupi Lan, which broke out in 1904, was against the order by the British colonial authorities to send Manipuri men to Kabow Valley to fetch timber for rebuilding the then Police Agent's bungalow after it was ravaged by fire. It was stirred up by the heirs-apparent of the erstwhile ruling family who did not like the selection of Churachand Singh as the ruler of Manipur. They persuaded the women of Manipur to resist the British colonial government's order to resuscitate the Lalup (a sort of forced labour where the male member of society between the ages of 17 and 60 should work for free for ten days in every forty days of work). The struggle in which more than 5,000 women took part lasted for a week. Although the British authorities had eventually succeeded in suppressing the uprising, they were compelled to rescind the order.

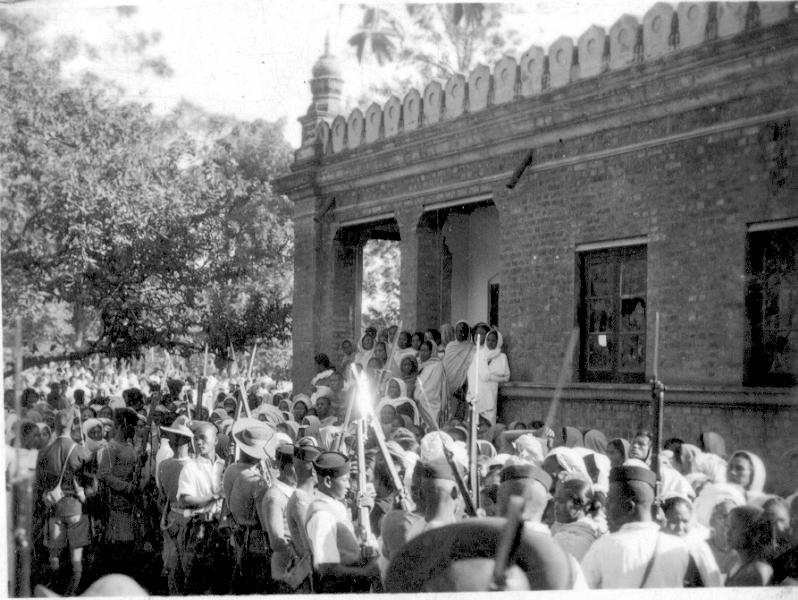
A photograph of a Nupi Lan in Manipur against British colonial rule c. 1904

== Second Nupi Lan ==
The second Nupi Lan (12 of December 1939) was set off by the indiscriminate export of rice from Manipur by Marwari businessmen with the support of the colonial government. It resulted in a famine-like situation in Manipur even though it was harvest season.

Although the movement was started as an agitation by Manipuri women against the economic and administrative policies of the Manipur Maharaja and the Political Agent Mr. Grimson of the British Government (1933–45) in Manipur, it evolved into a movement for the constitutional and administrative reform in Manipur.

When the Manipuri women, who had been playing a decisive role in the agrarian economy of the region, came out in a legion on the streets against the British policy of massive export of rice, the authorities responded by deploying military and police forces against the unarmed women protesters. They fought valiantly against the British policies, and a few of them lost their lives in the agitation. The struggle lasted for several months but subsided as a result of the outbreak of the Second World War.

== Importance ==
Historians opine that the Nupi Lan movement contributed much to the making of Manipur. First, it sowed the seeds of economic and political reforms. Secondly, it was a turning point to the political lives of leaders like Jan Neta Hijam Irabot, whose major focus had, until then, been social reforms. Irabot later turned a firebrand communist and founded the Communist Party in Manipur.

== See also ==
- Meira Paibi
- Ima Market
