= Churachand Singh =

- Maharaja
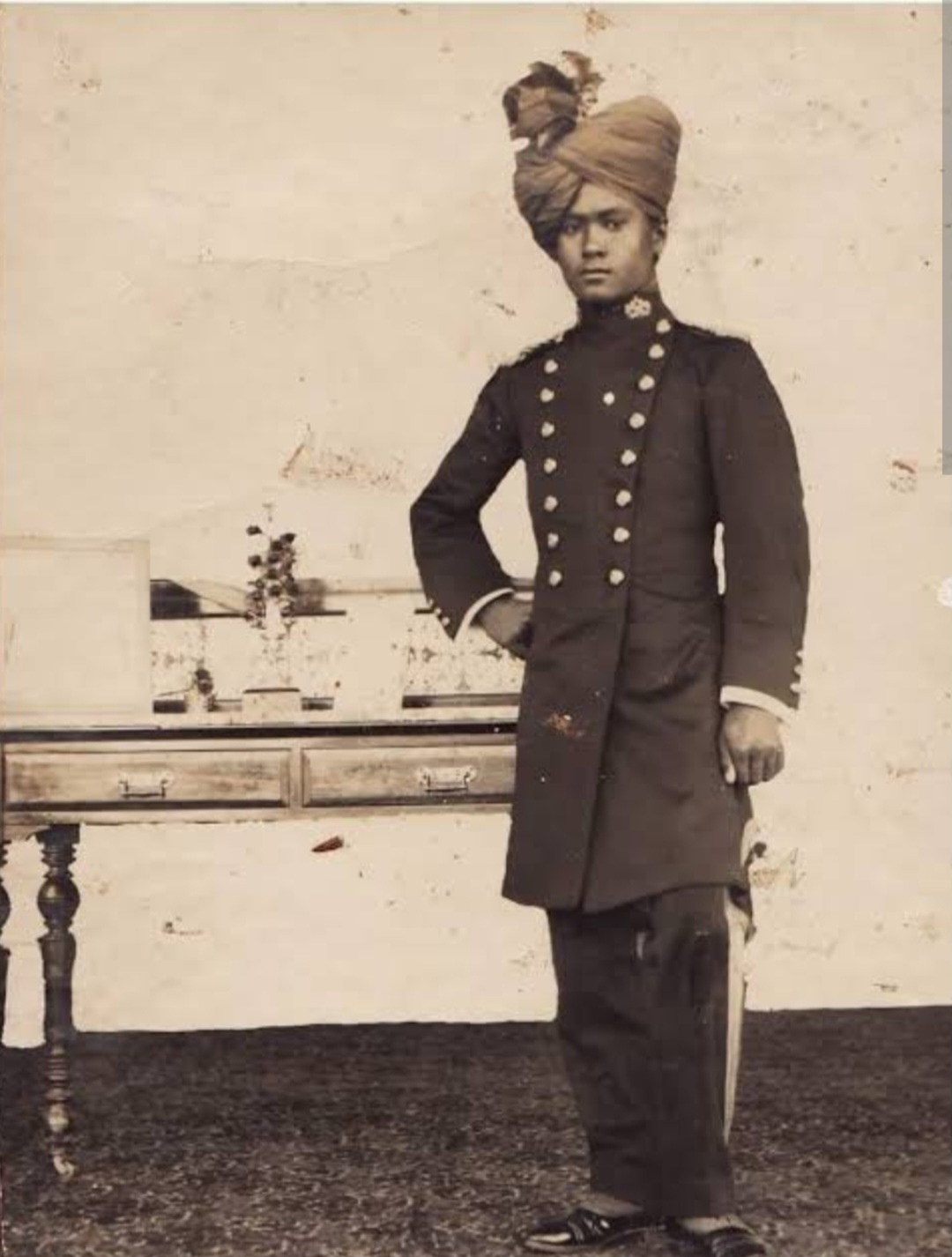
- Sir Churachand Singh
- Reign: 1892–1941 AD
- Predecessor: Kulachandra Singh
- Successor: Bodhchandra Singh
- Born: April 15, 1885; Kangleipak
- Died: November 6, 1941 (aged 56); Nabadwip
- Burial: Nabadwip
- Issue: M. K. Binodini Devi; Bodhchandra Singh
- House: Ningthouja dynasty
- Father: Chowbi Yaima

Maharaja Sir Churachand Singh KCSI CBE, also known as Churachandra or Chura Chand (15 April 1885 – 6 November 1941), was a ruler of the princely state of Manipur under the British Raj. He was a great-grandson of Raja Nara Singh who had ruled up to 1850 prior to Raja Chandrakirti Singh. Churachand Singh's investiture followed the quelling of the Manipur Rebellion of 1891, when the entire ruling family was convicted. Churachand Singh enjoyed a long reign until 1941, but his power was nominal.

== Investiture ==
After quelling the Manipur Rebellion of 1891, the British imprisoned Raja Kulachandra Singh and took full control of Manipur, but eventually decided to "regrant" it to the Manipuri as an "act of mercy". Churachand Singh, who was the youngest son of Chowbi Yaima, in turn a grandson of Raja Nara Singh, was selected to be the next Raja. He succeeded to the throne on 18 September 1891, and his investiture ceremony took place on 28 April 1892. Churachand Singh was seven years old at that time. During his minority, the British Political Agent to Manipur acted as the Superintendent and administered the state.

Singh was sent Mayo College in Ajmer for education in 1895. He returned in 1901. The administration of the state was handed over to him in 1907.

== Rule ==
Churachand Singh ruled the state between 1907 and 1941, under British supervision exercised by the Lieutenant Governor of East Bengal and Assam. A Darbar was established with three Ordinary Members (who held government departments) and three Additional Members (as councillors). Initially, Churachand Singh served as the President of the Darbar, and a British-appointed ICS officer served as the vice-president. This arrangement was terminated in 1916, when the British officer became the President of the Darbar.

Irrespective of the arrangement, the administration of the state was to be conducted according to the 'Rules for the Management of the State of Manipur', which were in force until 1947. The real executive power rested with the Political Agent.

Churachand Singh received the title of Maharaja in 1918 and was knighted as a Knight Commander of the Order of the Star of India in the 1934 New Year Honours, becoming Sir Churachandra Singh.

In September 1941, after 50 year's reign, Singh announced his intention to abdicate as he was suffering from tuberculosis, but before this could be arranged, he died on 6 November 1941 in Nabadwip.

== Personal life ==
Churachand Singh had six wives. He had six daughters and five sons from them. In addition, one son was adopted by the Maharani.

== See also ==
- List of Manipuri kings
- Manipur (princely state)
- Churachand Singh Trophy, football tournament named after him

== Bibliography ==
- Ibochou Singh, Khwairakpam (1985). British administration in Manipur 1891–1947 (PhD thesis). Gauhati University. hdl:10603/66697 – via Shodhganga.
- Lokendra, N. (1998), The Unquiet Valley: Society, Economy, and Politics of Manipur (1891-1950), Mittal Publications, ISBN 978-81-7099-696-5
- Moyon, Rev. Dr. Koningthung Ngoru (2021), Insights of the Western Missionaries Legacy in Manipur, Blue Rose Publishers
- Sanatomba, Kangujam (2015), "Interrogation into the political status of Manipur", in Arambam Noni; Kangujam Sanatomba (eds.), Colonialism and Resistance: Society and State in Manipur, Routledge, pp. 159–180, ISBN 978-1-317-27066-9
- Singh, Karam Manimohan (1991), History of the Christian Missions in Manipur and Neighbouring States, Mittal Publications, ISBN 81-7099-285-0 – via archive.org
- Sinha, L. P. (1987), "The Politics and Government of Manipur", The Indian Journal of Political Science, 48 (4): 487–493, JSTOR 41855332
- Sudhirkumar Singh, Haorongbam (2011). Socio-religious and Political Movements in Modern Manipur 1934–51 (PhD thesis). Jawaharlal Nehru University. hdl:10603/121665 – via Shodhganga.

Preceded by Kulachandra	King of Manipur; 1892–1941	Succeeded by Bodhchandra Singh
