= James Quinton =

James Quinton may refer to:

- James Quinton (cricketer) (1874–1922), English cricketer
- James Quinton (politician) (1821–1874), farmer, building contractor and political figure in New Brunswick
- James Wallace Quinton (1834–1891), British colonial administrator
