= Francis Quinton =

English cricketer (1865–1926)

Brigadier-General Francis Quinton CIE
- Born: Francis William Drummond Quinton; 27 November 1865; Faizabad, North-Western Provinces, British India
- Died: 5 December 1926 (aged 60); Marylebone, London, England
- Cricket career

Personal information
- Batting: Right-handed
- Bowling: Unknown-arm underarm slow
- Relatives: James Quinton (brother)

Domestic team information
- Years: Team
- 1893–1895: Marylebone Cricket Club
- 1895–1900: Hampshire

Career statistics
Competition	First-class
Matches	51
Runs scored	2,393
Batting average	27.82
100s/50s	2/14
Top score	178
Balls bowled	1,319
Wickets	30
Bowling average	28.50
5 wickets in innings	1
10 wickets in match	–
Best bowling	5/93
Catches/stumpings	45/–
- Source: Cricinfo, 28 December 2009

Brigadier-General Francis William Drummond Quinton CIE (27 November 1865 — 5 December 1926) was a British Army officer and an English first-class cricketer.

== Early military service and cricket ==
The son of the colonial administrator James Wallace Quinton, he was born in British India at Faizabad in November 1865. He was educated in England at Marlborough College, where he represented the college at rackets and played for the cricket eleven. From there, he attended the Royal Military Academy at Woolwich and graduated from there in as a second lieutenant into the Royal Artillery (RA) in September 1885. Earlier in 1885, he had made his debut in first-class cricket for C. I. Thornton's England XI against Cambridge University, having previously played minor matches for Devon prior to the formation of the present day county club. In 1892, while playing regimental cricket, he scored 216 not out in a match for the RA against the Royal Inniskilling Fusiliers. Eight years would pass before he next played first-class cricket, for the Marylebone Cricket Club (MCC) against Oxford University. He played for the MCC in the same fixture in 1894, in addition to playing for the West of England against the East of England at Portsmouth.

Having played for the MCC in two matches early in the 1895 season, Quinton went onto play for Hampshire in ten matches in the 1895 County Championship; in his first season playing for Hampshire, he performed well and recorded his maiden century with a score of 178 against Leicestershire. Quinton played first-class cricket for Hampshire until 1900, making 45 appearances for the county. Described by Wisden as "a free and effective hitter", he scored 2,178 runs for Hampshire at an average of 28.28, making two centuries and fourteen half centuries. With his underarm slow bowling, he took 30 wickets at a bowling average of 28.50; he took one five wicket haul of 5 for 93.

== Later military service and life ==
In the RA, Quinton was promoted to captain in February 1896, and was appointed to the RMA as an instructor in April of the same year. He was promoted to major in November 1900, with promotion to lieutenant colonel following over a decade later in November 1912. Serving in the First World War, he was seconded for service on the staff in June 1915, before being appointed a temporary brigadier-general whilst assuming a command in June 1917. Having spent part of the war serving in British India, where he held a command. As a result, he was made a Companion of the Order of the Indian Empire in September 1919, following the war. Quinton retired from active service in May 1920, at which point he was given the honorary rank of brigadier-general.

In December 1922, his younger brother, James (a schoolmaster and cricketer), committed suicide. In the lead up to his suicide, his brother had written a note to him asking him to travel to London to meet him at Charing Cross; however, he did not receive in time to meet, but did send him a telegram telling him not to do anything until he had seen him. He subsequently gave evidence at the inquest into his death. Quinton died at Marylebone in December 1926.
