= Hands Off China =

Mass protest campaign

Hands Off China was an international protest campaign that emerged in the mid-1920s opposing Western Powers foreign intervention in China. The movement was initiated in the summer of 1924 by the Executive Committee of the Communist International (ECCI) in cooperation with the bureau of the Red International of Labour Unions (RILU), which helped organize a "Hands off China" society with branches in several countries, including Soviet Russia and a number of Western states.

The early campaign was connected with the Canton Merchant Volunteers Incident of 1924. It gained significantly wider public attention in 1925 following the killing of Chinese labor demonstrators in the Shanghai International Settlement by the Shanghai Municipal Police. The incident helped spark the May Thirtieth Movement in China and led to increased demonstrations, meetings, and solidarity actions abroad, particularly in the United Kingdom and other countries where labor and socialist organizations promoted the slogan “Hands Off China”.

In Britain, the movement developed into a visible protest campaign between 1925 and 1927, organizing rallies, publications, and solidarity activities in support of Chinese workers and against foreign imperial influence in China.
