= Sikhism in Hong Kong =

Sikhism in Hong Kong 香港錫克教

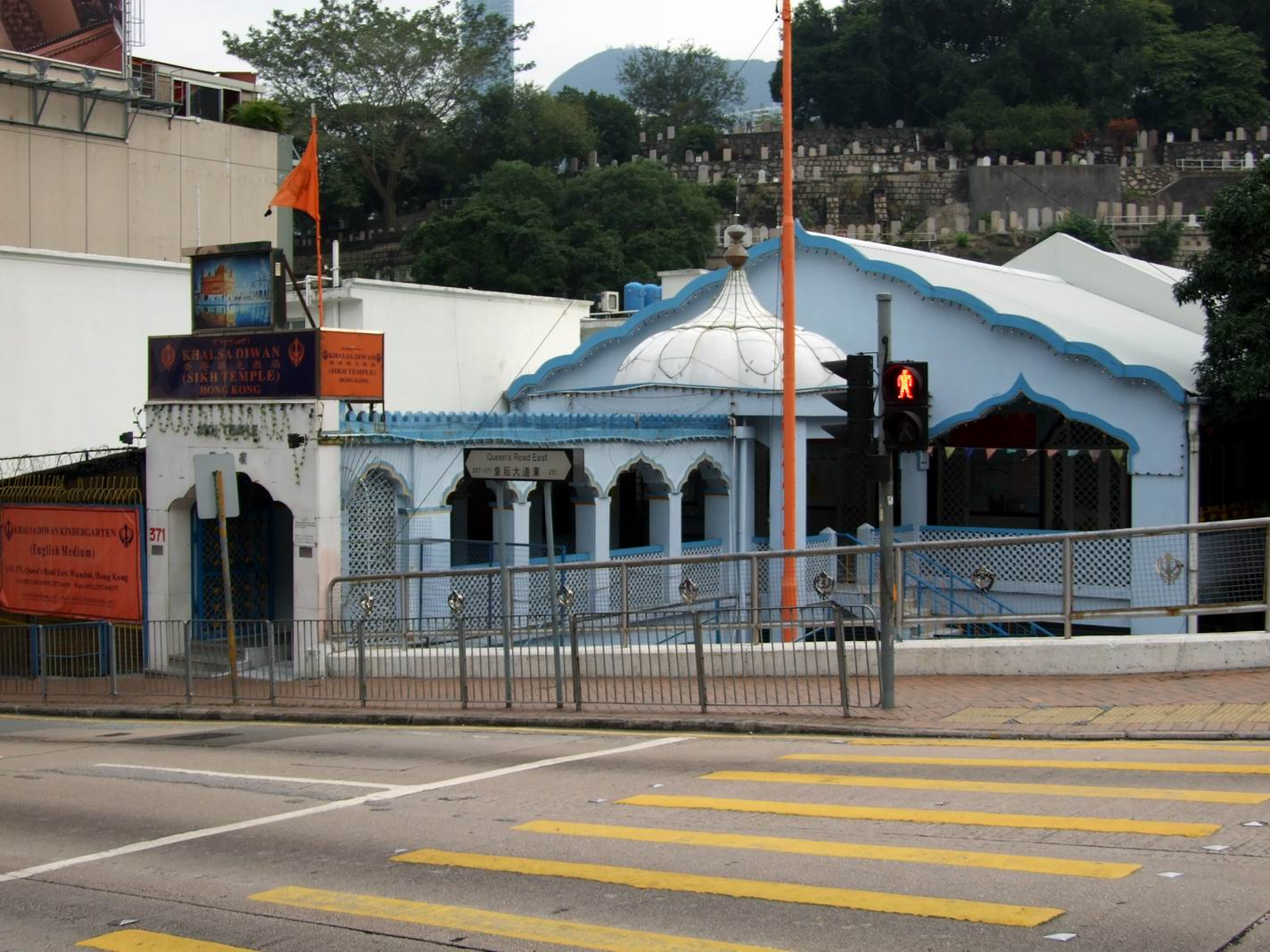
- Khalsa Diwan Gurdwara, Wan Chai

Total population
- 15,000

Religions
- Sikhism

Languages
- Punjabi · Cantonese · Hindi • Urdu

Sikhism in Hong Kong is a minority religion (Chinese: 香港錫克教, romanized: hoeng1 gong2 sek3 hak1 gaau3). Sources vary on the Sikh population of the territory, ranging from between 12,000–15,000 Sikhs in-total.

== History ==
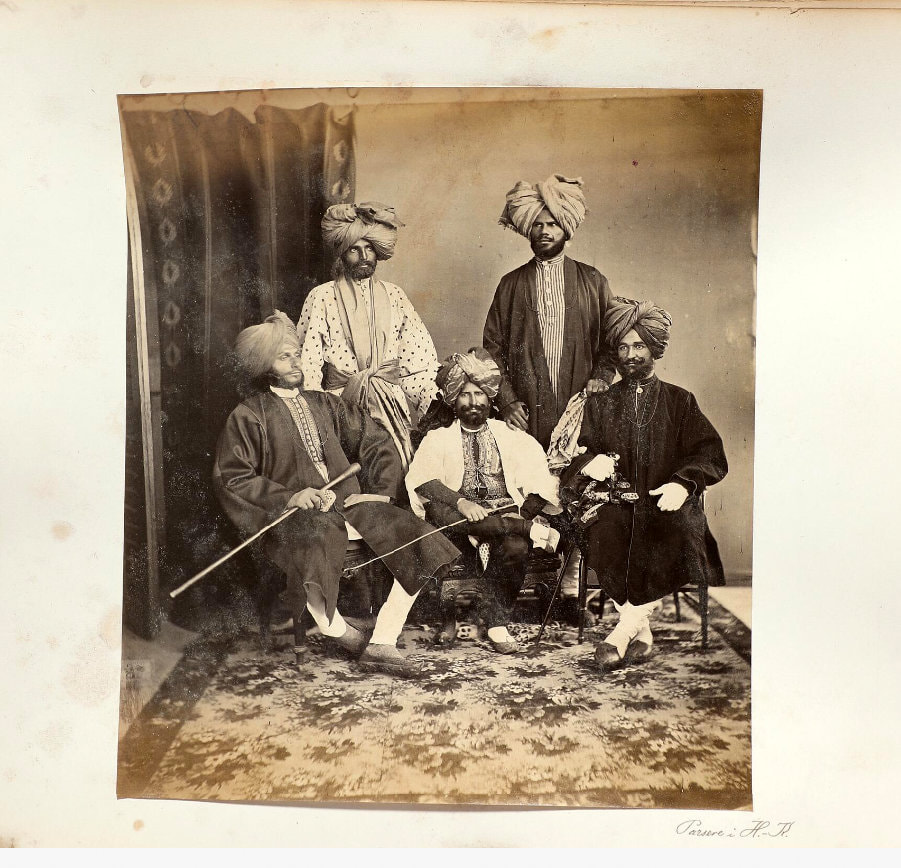
Photograph of Sikh policemen in Hong Kong, ca.1870–72. This photograph was taken during the Tordenskjold's expedition to the east to lay undersea cables.

In the colonial-era, Sikhs in China were most prominent in Hong Kong, with Shanghai following next. During the 1800s and 1900s, many Sikh Punjabi people were recruited from British India to work as officers for the Hong Kong Police and Shanghai Municipal Police. A contingent of Sikh policemen arrived in Hong Kong in 1867.

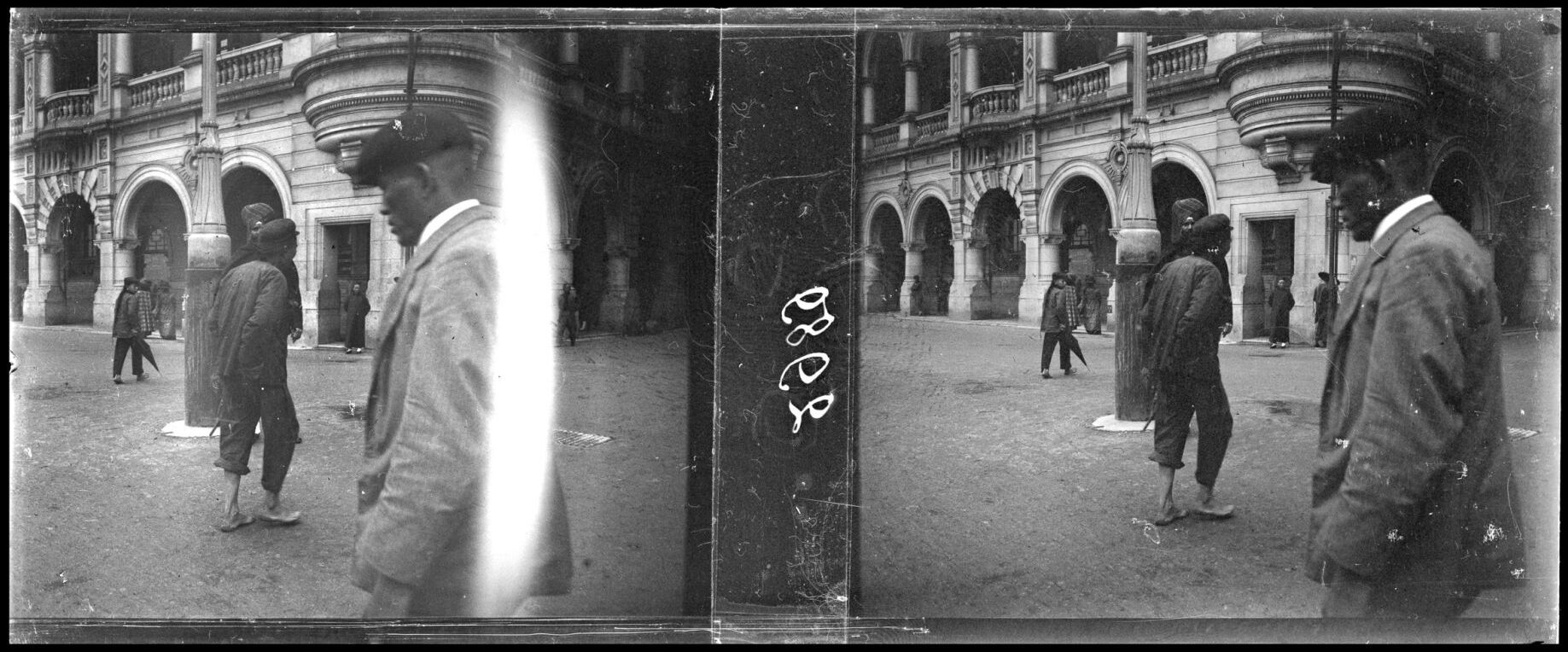
Sikh spotted on road in 1909 in Hong Kong (Victoria, Central District). Street scene in front of Queen's Building, corner of Connaught Road on the left and Ice House Street on the right.

After the Indian police unit of the Shanghai Municipal Police force was disbanded in 1945, most of its former policemen were repatriated back to India or moved to Hong Kong or Singapore. After the advent of Communist rule in 1949, many Sikhs who had been employed as watchmen in mainland China departed for resettlement in Hong Kong, immigrated to the West, or returned to India. Most of the remaining Sikhs left Shanghai in 1973 after the Sino-Indian War in 1962, these fleeing Shanghai Sikhs shifted to Hong Kong. In contrast to the gurdwaras of mainland China, Hong Kong's gurdwaras still function normally.

The modern Hong Kong Police Force increasingly has admitted Sikh applicants to join the force, causing it to adjust its policies to allow the Sikh cadets to don a specially-provided turban as part of their uniform. There have been cases of native Cantonese Hongkongers converting to Sikhism.

== Gurdwaras ==
- Khalsa Diwan Sikh Temple – located on Queen’s Road East, Wan Chai and classified as a Grade II Historic Building and managed by the Khalsa Diwan.
