= James Quinton (cricketer) =

English cricketer & educator (1874–1922)

Personal information
- Full name: James Maurice Quinton
- Born: 12 May 1874; Simla, Punjab Province, British India
- Died: 22 December 1922 (aged 48); Reading, Berkshire, England
- Batting: Right-handed
- Bowling: Right-arm fast
- Relatives: Francis Quinton (brother)

Domestic team information
- Years: Team
- 1895–1896: Oxford University
- 1895–1899: Hampshire

Career statistics
Competition	First-class
Matches	6
Runs scored	79
Batting average	9.87
100s/50s	–/–
Top score	22
Balls bowled	175
Wickets	1
Bowling average	111.00
5 wickets in innings	–
10 wickets in match	–
Best bowling	1/14
Catches/stumpings	5/–
- Source: ESPNcricinfo, 28 December 2009

James Maurice Quinton (12 May 1874 – 22 December 1922) was an English first-class cricketer and educator. The son of the colonial administrator James Wallace Quinton, he was born in British India at Simla in May 1874. He was educated in England at Cheltenham College, where he played for and captained the college cricket team. From there, he matriculated to Worcester College, Oxford. It was for Oxford University that Quinton made his debut in first-class cricket for, against the Marylebone Cricket Club (MCC) at Oxford in 1895. In the same season, he also played for Hampshire against Leicestershire in the County Championship. He made a second appearance for Oxford University against the MCC in 1896, before making two appearances for Hampshire in the 1896 County Championship. A final appearance for Hampshire followed in the 1899 County Championship, against Essex. In six first-class matches, Quinton scored 79 runs at an average of 9.87, in addition to taking a single wicket.

After graduating from Oxford, he became an assistant master at Stanmore Park School, where his headmaster was an Oxford cricket blue of an earlier vintage, Vernon Royle. Three days before Christmas in 1922, he boarded a Great Western Railway express train. Shortly before the train reached Reading, Quinton committed suicide by shooting himself in the head in a first-class lavatory. The inquest into his death was told by his older brother, Francis Quinton (who was an army officer and cricketer), that he had been depressed after a bout of influenza and had been unreasonably worried over a mistake in his membership of a London club, an apparently trivial matter which he had seen as a potential disgrace for himself and his family. The coroner returned a verdict of "suicide during temporary insanity". At the time of his death, Quinton was described as living in Church Crookham, Hampshire.
