= Khalsa Diwan Sikh Temple =

Coordinates: 22.274503°N 114.177987°E

Khalsa Diwan Sikh Gurudwara
- خالسا دیوان سکھّ گرودوارا ਖਾਲਸਾ ਦੀਵਾਨ ਸਿੱਖ ਗੁਰੂਦਵਾਰਾ 香港錫克教廟

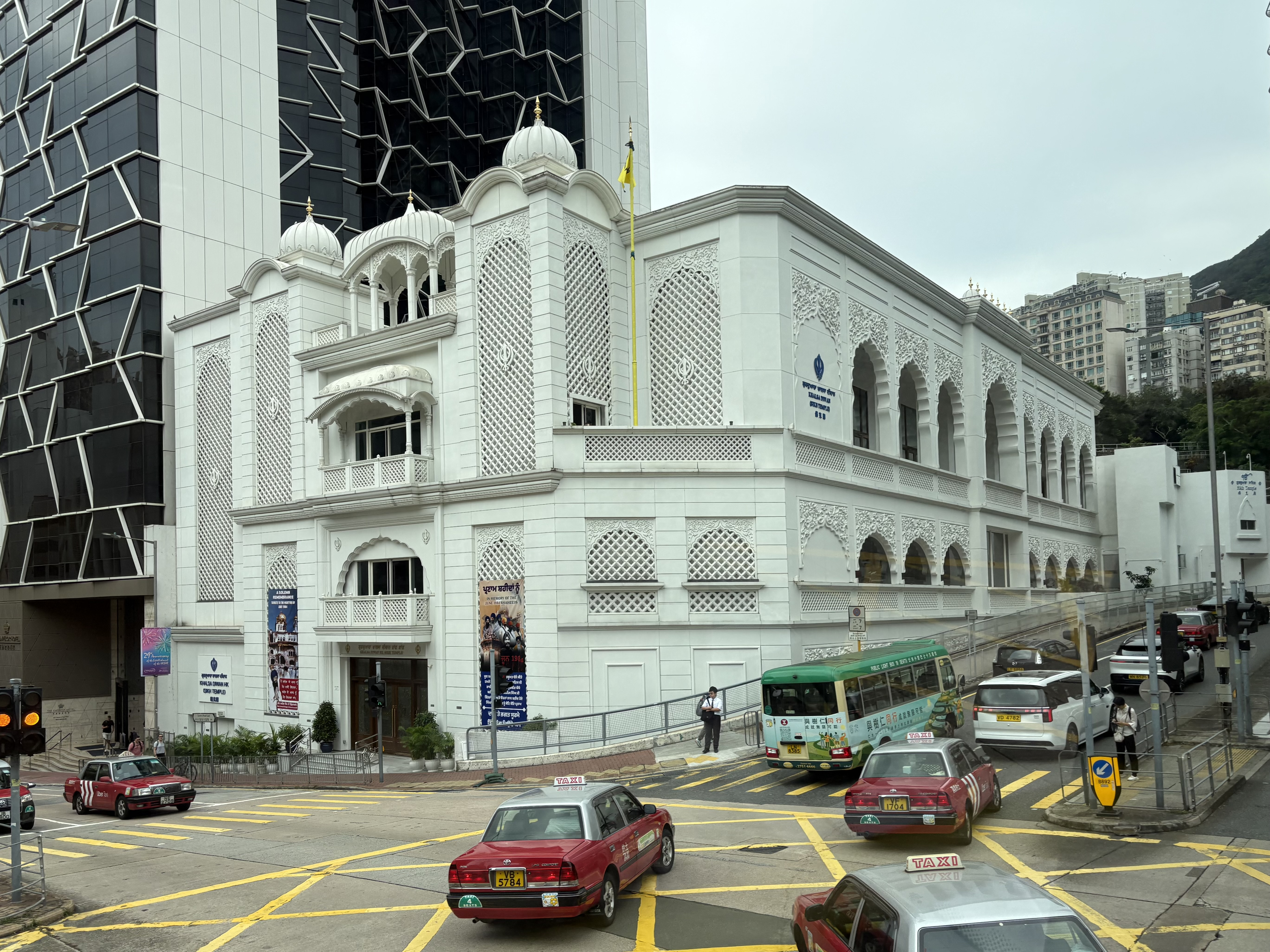
- Khalsa Diwan as seen from the intersection of Stubbs Road and Queen's Road East
- Former names: Sri Guru Singh Sabha
- Alternative names: Sikh Temple Hong Kong

General information
- Type: Gurdwara
- Location: Wan Chai District, Hong Kong, 371 Queen's Road East, Wan Chai, Hong Kong, China
- Completed: 1901
- Opened: 1901
- Inaugurated: 1901
- Renovated: 1930s 1980s 2018-2022
- Cost: HK$170,000,000
- Renovation cost: No rent required
- Client: Sikh Community and Sindhi Community in Hong Kong
- Owner: Sikh Community and Sindhi Community in Hong Kong

Technical details
- Floor count: 2
- Lifts/elevators: 1

Other information
- Number of rooms: 3
- Parking: 1

Website
- Official website

Hong Kong Sikh temple

Chinese name
- Traditional Chinese: 香港錫克廟
- Simplified Chinese: 香港锡克庙
Transcriptions
Standard Mandarin
- Hanyu Pinyin: Xiānggǎng Xīkè Miào
Yue: Cantonese
- Yale Romanization: Hēung góng sek hāk miuh
- Jyutping: Hoeng1 gong2 sek3 hak1 miu6

Wanchai Sikh temple
- Traditional Chinese: 灣仔錫克廟
- Simplified Chinese: 湾仔锡克庙
Transcriptions
Standard Mandarin
- Hanyu Pinyin: Wān Zǎi Xīkè Miào
Yue: Cantonese
- Yale Romanization: Wāan jái sek hāk miuh
- Jyutping: Waan1 zai2 sek3 hak1 miu6

Punjabi name
- Punjabi: ਖਾਲਸੇ ਦੀਵਾਨ ਸਿੱਖ ਗੁਰੂਦਵਾਰਾ

Khalsa Diwan Sikh Temple (Cantonese: 香港錫克教廟, romanized: hoeng1 gong2 sek6 haak1 gaau3 miu2), originally known as Sri Guru Singh Sabha, is a gurdwara in the Wan Chai District of Hong Kong, on the junction of Queen's Road East and Stubbs Road, Hong Kong Island. It was re-opened on 8 November 2022 by Hong Kong Chief Executive John Lee Ka-chiu after a five-year renovation project.

== History ==
=== First gurdwara ===
The gurdwara was built in 1901 by local Sikhs, including soldiers from the British Army, with the intent of providing religious, social, practical and cohesive support to Sikhs in Hong Kong. The temple that was constructed was originally called Sri Guru Singh Sabha.

Many Sikhs on their way to immigrate to Canada, in what later became the Komagata Maru incident, slept in the gurdwara and prayed there before boarding the ship in 1914.

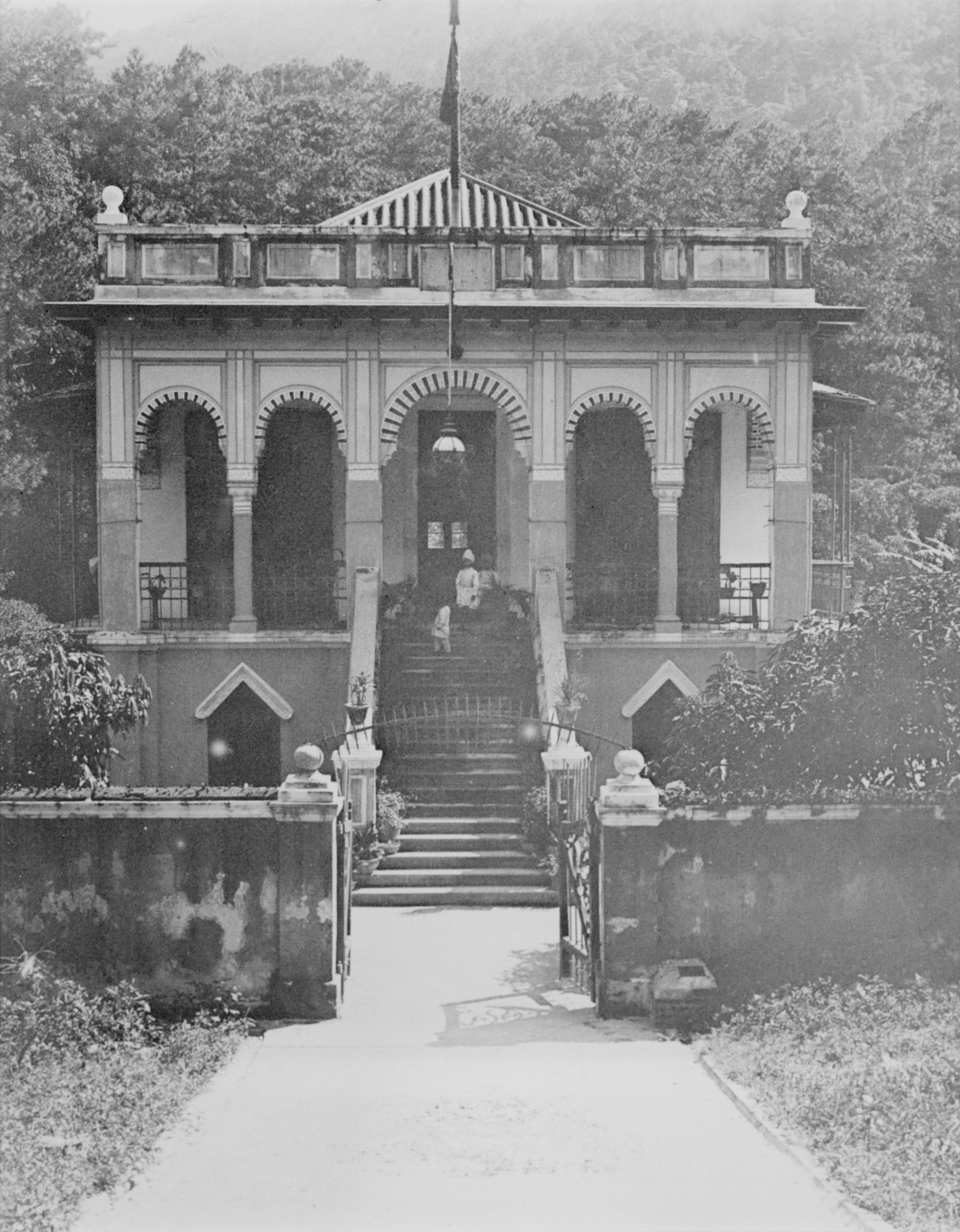
Original Sri Guru Singh Sabha gurdwara in Hong Kong

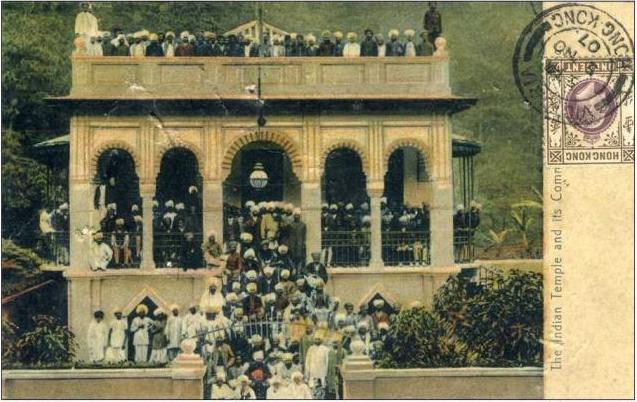
Sri Guru Singh Sabha gurdwara in Hong Kong, ca.1907 (postcard)

=== Second gurdwara ===
In the 1930s, with an increase in the size of the local Sikh community, the gurdwara was extended and rebuilt. It was bombed twice during World War II, suffering extensive damage that killed the gurdwara granthi, Bhai Nand Singh, whilst he was in the main prayer hall reading the Guru Granth Sahib, with the scripture not sustaining any damage in the bombing. During the Second World War, the place of worship was used as a shelter by both Sikhs and non-Sikhs.

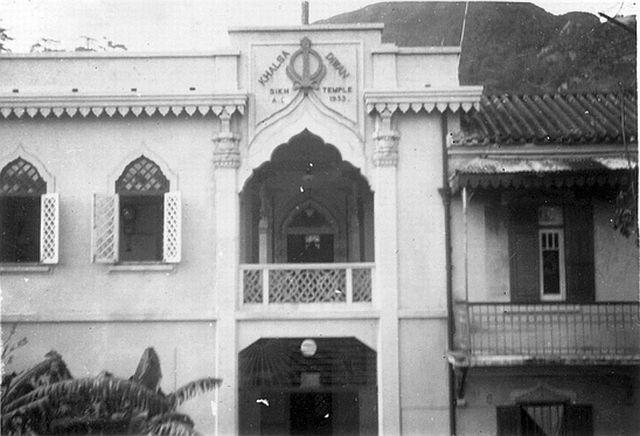
Khalsa Diwan Sikh Temple gurdwara in Hong Kong, ca.1935

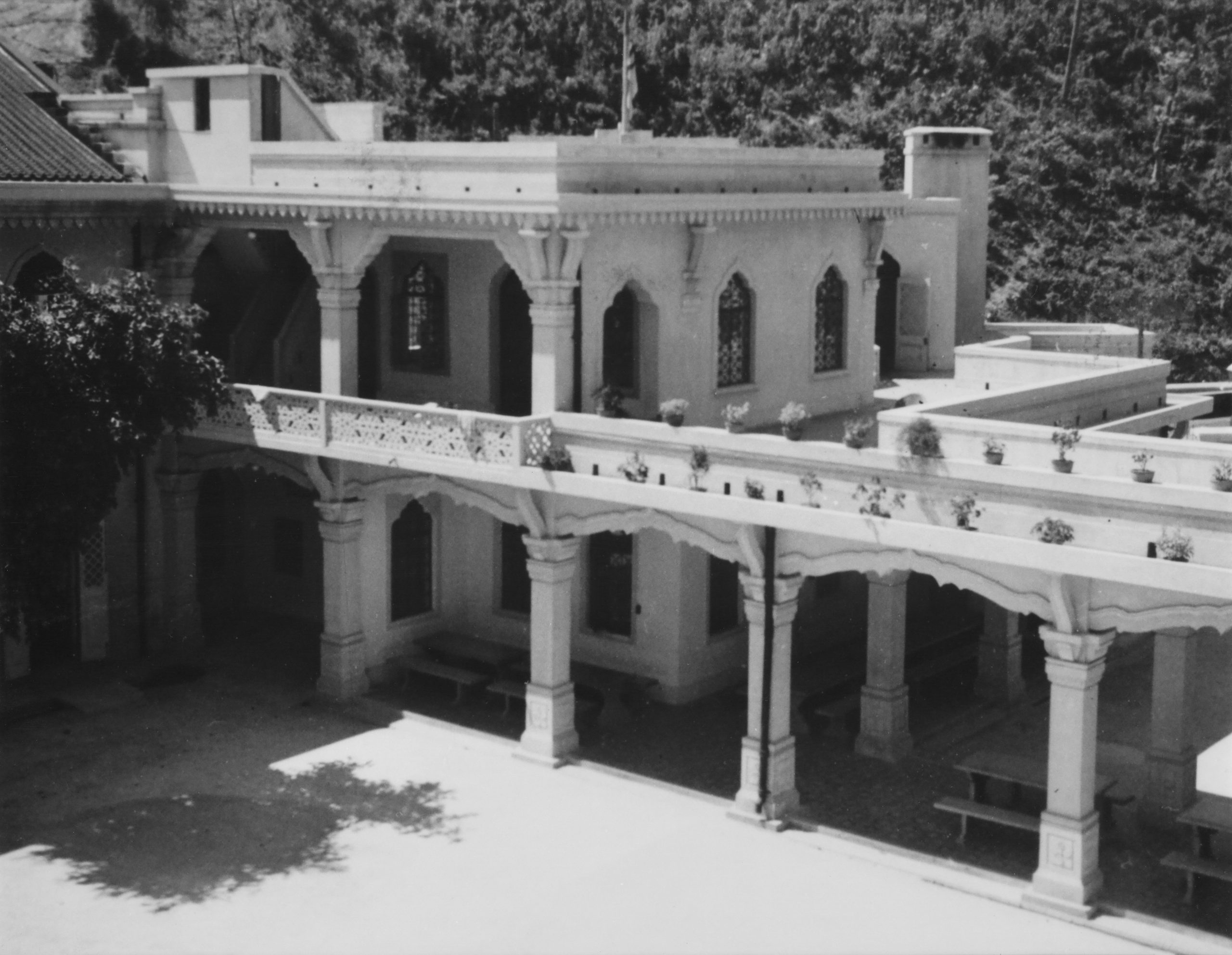

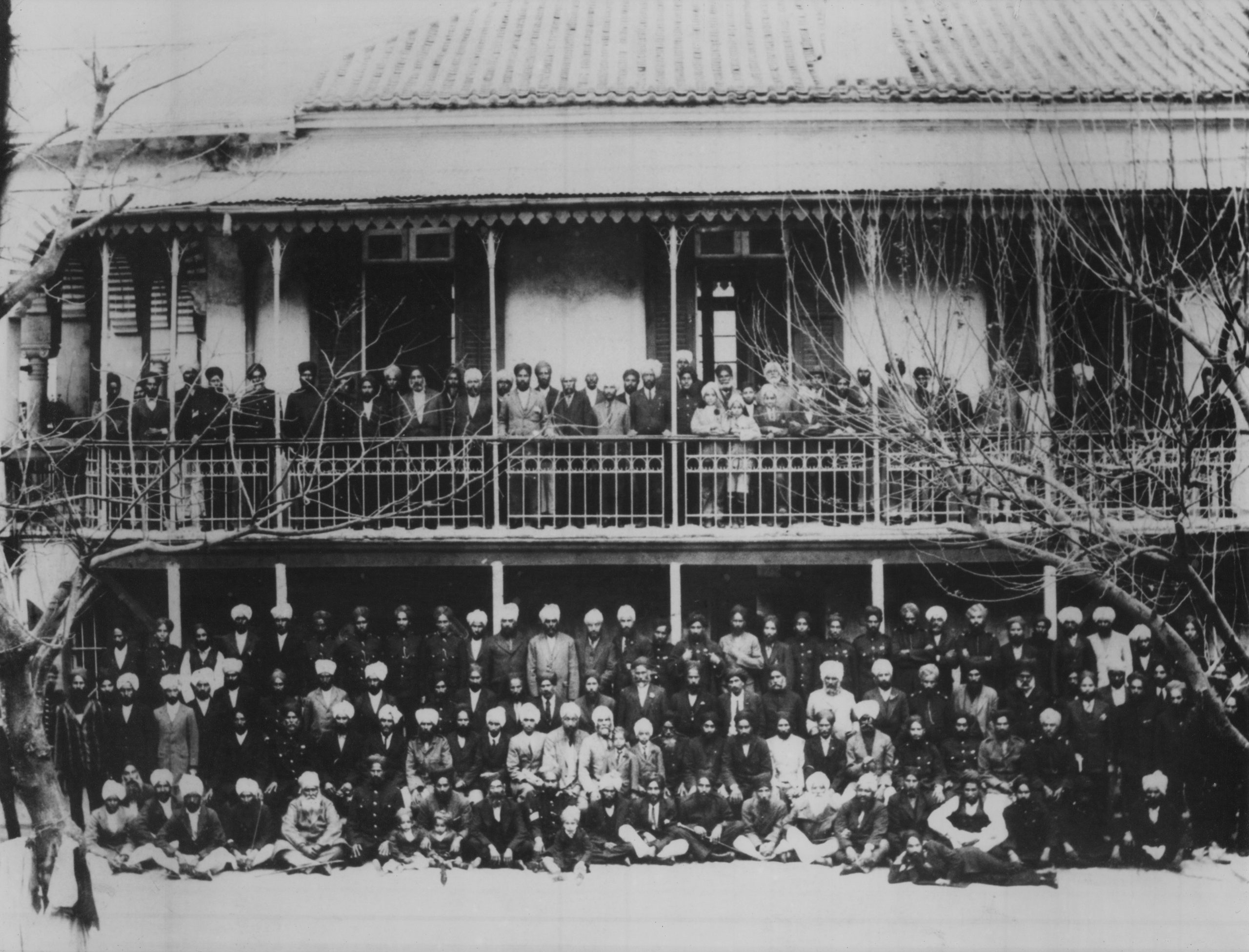
Sikh congregation at the original Sri Guru Singh Sabha gurdwara in Hong Kong, 1935

=== Third gurdwara ===
The damaged parts of the gurdwara were rebuilt after the war by the community, with the assistance of Sindhi Hindus who immigrated to Hong Kong in large numbers due to the Partition. The gurdwara was again extended in the 1980s, and linked to Queen's Road East by a covered bridge, which provides easy access for the devotees.

In 2008, the gurdwara was extended to four-stories.

In 2013, the gurdwara (which was deemed a grade II historic building) was examined by experts and deemed unsafe due to cracks forming. Despite efforts to save the building, it was demolished and plans were made to reconstruct a new building.

=== Fourth gurdwara ===
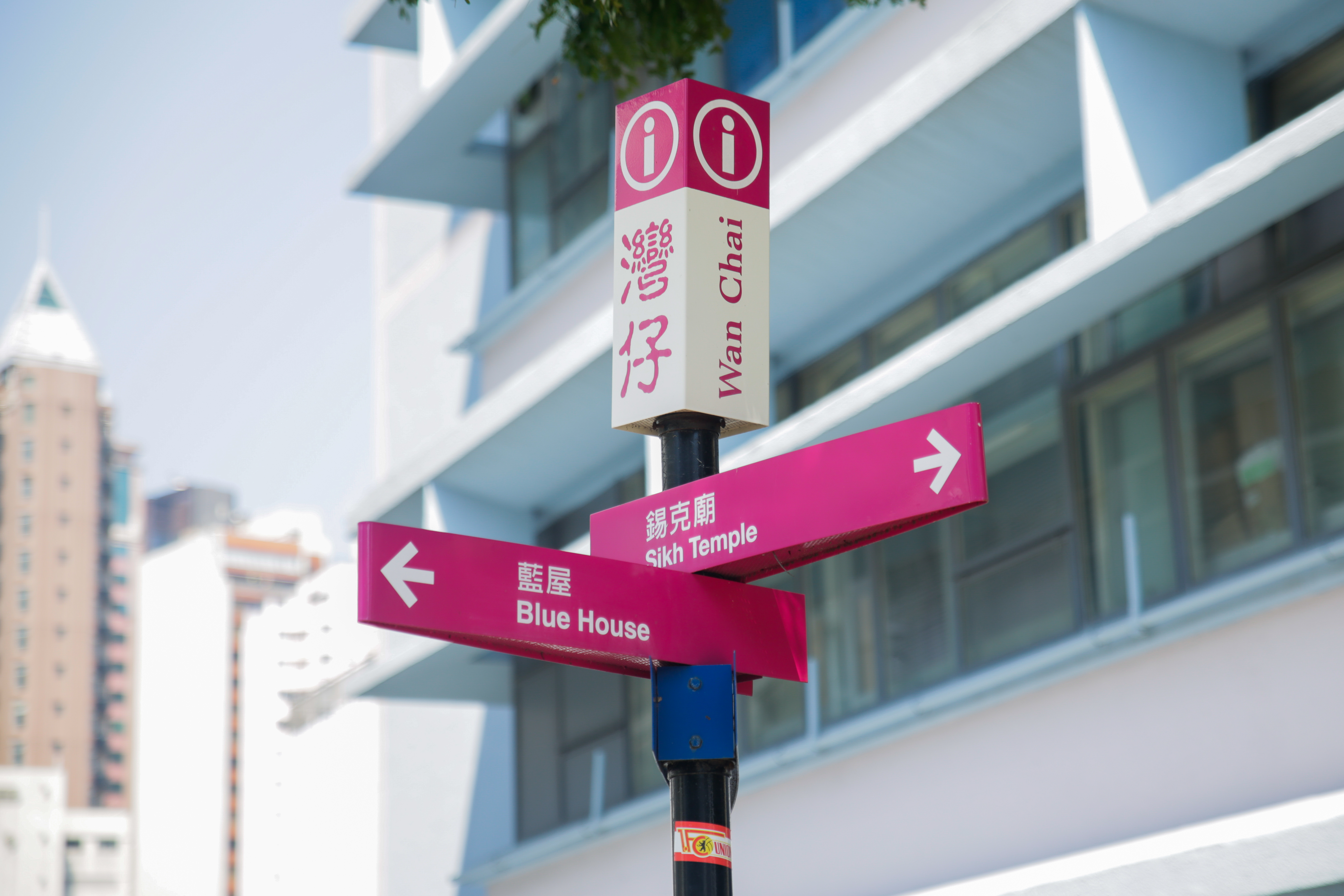
The Khalsa Diwan Sikh Temple; Right: Sign showing the way to Khalsa Diwan Sikh Temple

From 2017, the Khalsa Diwan Sikh Temple started reconstruction and had reopened in 2022. Spanning 76,000 square feet, the temple features a large prayer hall, a library, several classrooms and conference rooms. The Sikh community in Hong Kong and new-comers could celebrate major festivals and prayers, enjoy free-food, and children are enabled expose to Sikh culture and languages abroad from their home country. The COVID-19 pandemic delayed the rebuilding and increased the costs of the project, with renovation costs swelling from HKD170 million to HKD220 million.

Apart from religious purposes, the temple also serves as free accommodation for new migrants, from India and Pakistan, while its community kitchen, known as langar, provides around 5,000 free meals per week.

== See also ==
- Sikhism in Hong Kong
- Indians in Hong Kong
- South Asians in Hong Kong
- Battle of Hong Kong
