= Ethel Grimwood =

British businesswoman and writer

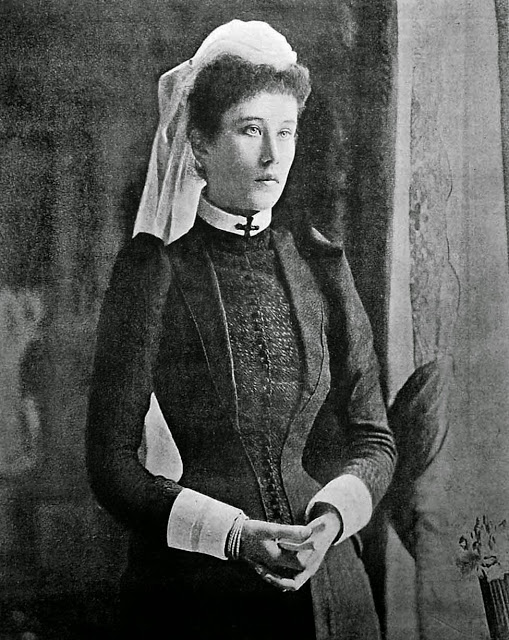
- Born: Ethel Moore; 4 October 1867; Mathura, British India
- Died: 11 August 1928 (aged 60); Portland, Oregon
- Other name: Evelyn Miller
- Education: private
- Occupations: diplomat's wife, businessperson and writer
- Known for: "Heroine of Manipur"
- Spouse(s): Frank Grimwood (m. 1871–1891), Andrew Cornwall Miller (m. 1895)

Ethel St Clair Grimwood, born Ethel Moore, became Ethel (Evelyn) Miller (4 October 1867 – 11 August 1928) was a British woman who became known as "the heroine of Manipur". During the Anglo-Manipur War of 1891, British power was used to undo a coup d'état within the ruling royal family. Ethel's husband, Frank Grimwood was the British representative in Manipur and the Grimwoods were on good terms with the new rulers. However, the coup was illegal, and if the British authorities had allowed the overthrow of one of their allies without protest it was feared that further challenges to their allies throughout the region might occur. Consequently, Lord Lansdowne, the Viceroy of India, against the advice of Frank Grimwood, decided to despatch a small military mission, under the command of a Commissioner Quinton, for the purpose of arresting Tikendrajit Singh, the key instigator of the coup. After the arrival of the mission at the British Residency in Manipur, Tikendrajit was summoned to the residency, where he initially presented himself, but after he was kept waiting he returned to the palace and subsequently, feigning illness, refused any requests to meet with the British. Unable to get Tikendrajit to submit to their requests, Quinton decided to use a small group of soldiers to infiltrate the palace and seize Tikendrajit. However, this attempt failed when Manipuri soldiers were alerted to their presence and fighting broke out. The following day the British attempted to negotiate an end to hostilities by sending a party of officers including Quinton and Grimwood into the palace. These officers were murdered while under the protection of Tikendrajit, and Manipuri forces renewed their attack upon the British residency. Realising their precarious position the surviving officers abandoned the Residency and lead a retreat back to British-held territory, accompanied by Ethel. Although distraught at the loss of her husband, Ethel showed great strength of character and was instrumental in guiding the retreating party as she was the only person familiar with the terrain. She was lionised in the British press for the role she had played, and she was awarded a medal, £1,000 and a pension. She mismanaged this money, married again, and died poor in Portland, Oregon.

== Early life ==
Grimwood was born in Mathura in 1867. Her first language was said to be Hindustani. Her mother was Margaret Emma Boisragon (born Gerrard) who in 1864 had left her husband Major-General Theodore Boisragon, CB, A. M. to live with Charles William Moore, a judge in Bengal. The subsequent divorce was a scandal at the time. Ethel Moore was left with an elder half-brother Alan Maxwell Boisragon in addition to younger sisters. She and her sisters were educated at Hove in England by Mary Ann Moulson. She married Frank St Clair Grimwood in 1887. He had been accepted at the bar in London before he accepted a position in the Indian civil service.

== Political life ==
In 1890 Frank Grimwood became the political agent in Imphal in Manipur on the British Empire’s north-west border. He lived there with Ethel Grimwood and they were friendly with the local rulers, notably the ruler's eight sons and especially Tikendrajit. He was their best friend there, he played polo with her husband and because he could speak Hindustani they could have a conversation. Neither Ethel nor her husband could speak the local language although Frank persevered with lessons. On 21 September 1890, prince Kulachandra Singh led his brothers in a revolt against reigning Maharaja Surchandra who had taken power after Maharajah Chandrakirti died. However Surchandra appealed to the Viceroy of India, Lord Lansdowne, who dispatched 400 Gurkhas under the inexperienced James Wallace Quinton to arrest the conspirators.

On 22 March 1891, Quinton reached Imphal, where his request for the surrender of Tikendrajit and the abdication of Maharajah Kulachandra, was declined. The following night, the British decided to attack the fort where Tikendrajit was residing, but soon realized they were outmatched; eventually, they were surrounded by Manipuri troops. Quinton then held talks with Kulachandra, but Frank Grimwood was speared to death. Quinton was detained and beheaded along with other British officers on 24 March 1891. The British who were besieged in the residency were led by two junior officers into a disorganised retreat.

On 27/28 March 1891, Colonel Charles James William Grant led a punitive force from Tamu, Burma to assist. Grant was awarded the Victoria Cross.

On 13 August, after a trial, Jubraj Tikendrajit and General Thangal were publicly hanged on the polo field. Three others would later be hanged in the prison.

On 22 September 1891 the five-year-old Meidingngu Churachand became the new nominal head of the state of Manipur.

Ethel had been the only woman in the retreat from the residency. She returned to England and she was lionised as a heroine of the "Manipur Disaster". Queen Victoria sought her advice as she thought using capital punishment on a prince might make the British appear treacherous. The queen wanted to give the Victoria Cross or the Crown of India to Grimwood but she was persuaded to use a lesser award. Grimwood received a Red Cross Medal even though the medal was for nursing and Grimwood was not a nurse. Grimwood assured the Queen that she did not hold Tikendrajit responsible for her husband's death, but she felt that he had committed other crimes. Grimwood was given £1,000 in addition to a collection and money to cover her losses during the fighting. As a widow she was given a pension of £140 per year. She wrote her biography, "My Three Years in Manipur and Escape from the Recent Mutiny", by November which sold well. It is unclear now as to her actual contribution, but a hero was required and Ethel became that hero.

== Later life ==
Ethel went on to marry again in 1895. Her new husband Andrew Cornwall Miller owned a paper mill in Surrey but by 1899 he had emigrated to America. He returned in 1903 when she was in court trying to recover money she had invested in a business with Madame Hugh Barry. She appears to have mortgaged her pension to invest in the business venture which failed. She and her husband went to Clackamas in Oregon but her husband returned to the UK without her.

Grimwood died in Portland, Oregon, having changed her name to Evelyn.
