= Edward William Everson =

Shanghai Police constable (1883–1950)

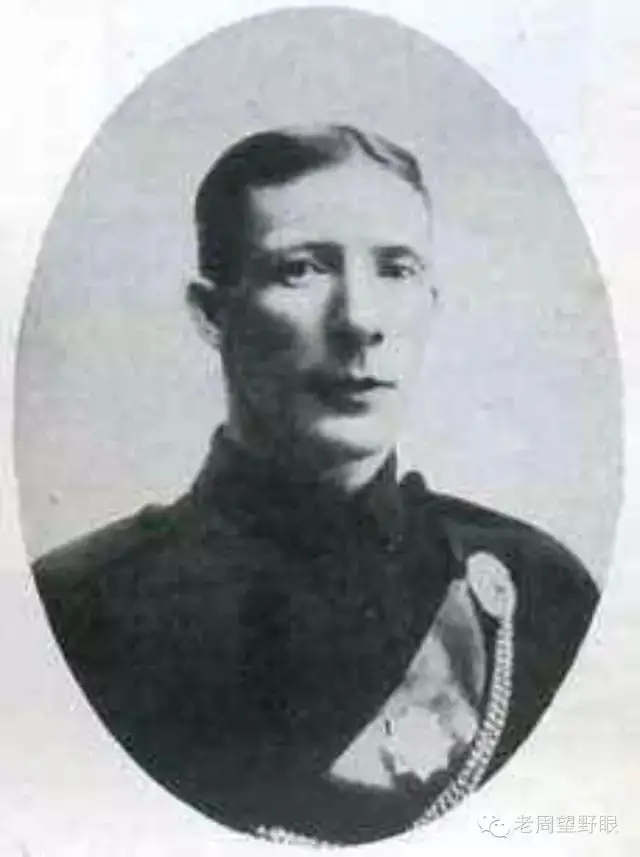
- Born: January 4, 1883; Westbury, Wiltshire, England
- Died: October 24, 1950 (aged 67); Machen, Monmouthshire, Wales
- Occupations: Police constable of the Shanghai Municipal Police; miner
- Employer: Shanghai Municipal Council
- Known for: May 30th Incident
- Title: Police Inspector of the Louza Police Station in Shanghai
- Spouse: May Poon (married 1924)
- Parents: Edwin Everson (father); Emma Roberts (mother)

Edward William Everson (January 4, 1883 – October 24, 1950) was a police constable of the Shanghai Municipal Police from 1906 to 1925. He served the role of a police inspector at the Louza Station in the Shanghai International Settlement. He was forced to resign after the May 30th Incident of 1925, in which he ordered his policemen to shoot unarmed civilian protestors on Nanking Road.

== Life before Shanghai ==
Edward William Everson was born on January 4, 1883, in Westbury as the first child of Edwin Everson and Emma Roberts. He initially worked as a coal miner in New Tredegar.

== Shanghai Policeman ==
Seeking better job opportunities, Everson left his post in 1906 and headed to the Shanghai International Settlement when he was 23 years old. He succeeded within the same year, becoming a police constable of the Shanghai Municipal Council, serving the Shanghai Municipal Police.

Everson fared extremely well in the police force. In just two years time, by 1908, he had achieved the role of police sergeant. In 1915, he voluntarily joined World War I as a British soldier, and returned three years later unscathed to resume his old post. By 1923 he became the police inspector at Louza Station.

One year later, in 1924, he married a Chinese woman named May Poon. This was highly extraordinary, as interracial and internationality marriage was typically looked down upon in the hierarchically rigid Shanghai back then. In addition, constables were expected to "devote their whole time to the police services", so marriages were seen as distractions to the policemen's attention. Everson, with the aid of his elevated rank within the police hierarchy however, was not affected.

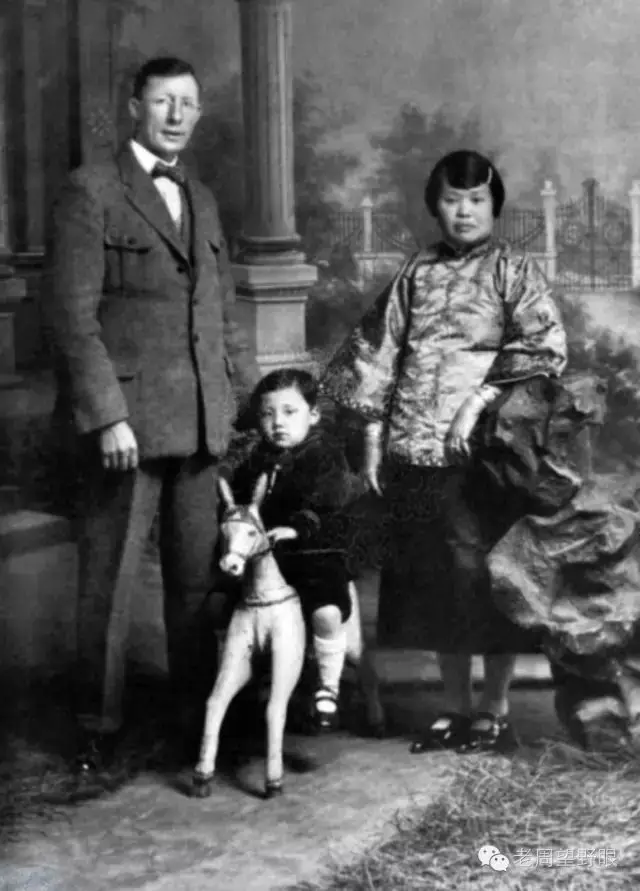
Edward William Everson with his family

== May 30th Incident ==
As Everson was enjoying his smooth career, Shanghai was in turmoil. The 1918 Hongkew Riot, where a gunfight between Japanese rioters and constables killed 2 and injured 9, strengthened the anti-Japanese nationalistic forces inside Shanghai. The "May 4th Movement" in 1919, a massive student demonstration in protest of China's mistreatment in the Versailles Treaty, sent nationalistic shockwaves throughout the newly established Chinese Republic. The Chinese people began resisting the foreign colonial presence in earnest. In 1921, the Chinese Communist Party was established and began organizing student and worker movements to protest against imperialism.

Starting from February 1925, Chinese workers in foreign factories began protesting about their poor working conditions. Demonstrations continued from February through May, with the aggressiveness and magnitude slowly augmenting. On May 16, a Chinese worker named Ku Cheng-hung was killed by Japanese factory owners for organizing a strike. Students all over Shanghai began protesting in response, and many illicitly entered the Shanghai International Settlement to organize demonstrations, getting arrested by constables in the process.

These protests culminated in a climax on May 30. At 12:15 PM, Everson received report that a large demonstration was gathering on the boundaries of the Settlement. He headed out to break up the protests but to no avail; he ended up arresting six students who were the alleged ringleaders.

The futile struggle to control the protest continued until 3:30 PM, when the demonstrators had now collected more than 2,000 men, and had advanced to being mere yards away from the Louza Station's gates. Everson, believing that the crowd was trying to overrun them and take the police station, collected all the officers he could find inside the station, which were only six people, and had them arm themselves with firearms. He then confronted the crowd by giving a verbal warning, "Stop! If you don't stop, I will shoot!", in both English and Wu. Seeing that the crowd was not deterred, he brandished his pistol.

Approximately 12 seconds after this point, the crowd came within 6 feet of the station. Without any prior warning, the students at the front jolted forward and broke into a mad dash for the Louza Station. Everson gave his men the order to fire.

The other constables complied, and the shooting barrage continued for less than half a minute. The crowd dispersed almost instantaneously. Four men were killed on the spot, dozens severely wounded and rushed to the hospital, where nine more would succumb to their wounds. A total of thirteen men died, some of which are minors.

== Aftermath ==
Shanghai's rage immediately boiled over, as protests and violence skyrocketed. Right after the incident, on June 1, the Communist Party began organizing strikes. Students ceased to go to school, workers ceased to work, and merchants ceased to trade; By June 4, over 74,000 people had already been on strike, forcing public life in the Settlement to grind to a halt. Rioters began wreaking havoc in earnest, destroying Shanghai's infrastructure.

A trial and investigation of the Incident was carried out, and Everson appeared before the Mixed Court on July 2 to testify about his actions. He argued that he had sufficient reason to believe that the protestors were attempting to take his police station, so he was firing in self defense when he gave that order to shoot, citing the Constable Handbook: "when life or property is under threat, shoot to kill".

Everson himself, however, was not tried; the testimonies he offered was used to prosecute the surviving protestors of the Incident. No formal charges were ever pressed upon him.

== Resignation from the Police ==
Although Everson was technically not guilty legally speaking for shooting the protestors, he was in the eyes of the Shanghai public. As enormous pressure mounted around the Settlement, the Municipal Council was forced to lay him off.

Everson was first transferred from the Louza station to the Putuo station, thus marginalizing his post and drastically reducing his salary. Everson protested heavily against this, begging his superiors to not punish him for his actions on May 30. Just overnight he became "hypersensitive, fanciful, and suffering from nerves". After several more months, the Municipal Council forced Everson to "voluntarily" resign from his office on December 29, 1925. Either to comfort or to complete their gesture of kindness, the SMC wrote Everson a thank-you note assuring him that nobody accuses him of any wrongdoings of his part in the Incident, to which Everson replied cautiously in his diary, "I did nothing wrong".

After resigning, Everson stayed in Shanghai for another three months, debating with the Municipal Council about his pension. They reached a compromise in early 1926, that Everson agreed to be formally laid off in exchange for a 2000-pound annual pension. This huge amount sparked another small protest, because many Chinese believed that their tax money was used to pay the outrageously generous funds.

On February 25, 1926, Edward William Everson left Shanghai with his wife and only child. They boarded a steamship of the London and China Express bound for Britain, and never returned again.

== Later life and death ==
Everson returned to Machen, Monmouthshire in 1927. He served shortly in the local patrol team as an officer, picking up his old occupation back in Shanghai briefly. His large pension fund kept him surviving for another twenty years, but his living had already disintegrated.

Edward William Everson passed away on October 24, 1950. He was buried in a Welsh common graveyard without any decorations; on his tombstone was engraved "We'll meet again" in plain text.
