= May Thirtieth Movement =

1925 anti-imperialist labor movement in Republic-era China

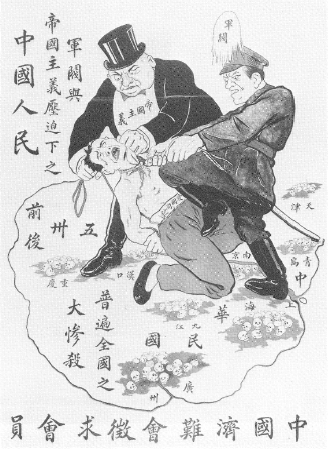
A propaganda poster depicting a Western imperialist and Chinese warlord torturing a protester in the aftermath of the May Thirtieth Movement

The May Thirtieth Movement (simplified Chinese: 五卅运动; traditional Chinese: 五卅運動; pinyin: Wǔsà Yùndòng) was a major labor and anti-imperialist movement during the middle-period of the Republic of China era. It began when the Shanghai Municipal Police opened fire on Chinese protesters in Shanghai's International Settlement on 30 May 1925. The shootings sparked international censure and nationwide anti-foreign demonstrations and riots such as the Hands Off China protests in the United Kingdom.

== Background ==
The Shanghai Mind of the Western World

The establishment of treaty ports going back to the unequal treaties, which concluded the Opium War on 24 October 1860, created a largely colonial society within China, diminishing their sovereignty. It also proposed a 'treaty port mentality' or 'Shanghai Mind' as described by British journalist, Arthur Ransome, in a 1927 editorial from the newspaper, the Chinese Puzzle. In the essay, Ransome argues that the combination of ethnocentrism, arrogance, and racism from British Shanghai led to the events of 30 May, otherwise known as the May 30th Tragedy in China (五卅慘案). He described British policy as "controlling the bottle neck through which the bulk of the China trade must pass; they prosper upon it coming and going."

By the 1920s, Shanghai had 37,600 foreigners living in the French Concession area. There were around 14,000 Japanese, 14,000 Americans and Frenchmen, and 9,000 British who dominated with the greatest foreign investment in the city with control over the administration of the International Settlement. In the first decade after WWI, there was a huge new wave of increasingly American influence in Shanghai as they established their own schools, churches, business associations, and social clubs. Foreign businessmen and their families saw their economic and social well-being intimately tied to the question of Shanghai's future, resisting any radical change that may impede that future.

In a reflection pertaining to the leadup to the anti-imperialist May 30th movement, an American journalist, Milly Bennet, wrote:

"...the only way to gain access to the business and social circles… was to echo their hidebound dogma which came to something like that the Chinese were a dirty, low, mongrel race, that they should be everlastingly grateful for being booted around by the extremely superior British, and how what the Chinese really needed was the firm British government to guide them."

Many westerners considered their ideas on modern municipal administration superior to the 'backwards' way of Chinese civilization as Shanghai was thought to be a tiny fishing village before it opened to the West in 1843. During the 1920s, this superiority complex was threatened by the declining power of the British empire. Hence, they attempted to maintain their privilege by doubling down on investments in the city as well as enforcing stricter political guidelines. Foreign settlements, with modern infrastructure and common law models, incentivized students to study and appreciate these systems rather than denouncing them as imperialist institutions which must be reclaimed. A 1922 Washington Conference raised discussions about China's chaotic state and the corruption and greed of warlords, showing how necessary it was, both for foreigners and Chinese, that the special privileges of foreigners continue until China has 'put her house in order.' Much of the blame was pushed onto students who according to westerners, misunderstood democratic institutions and culture and were incapable of independently overcoming the internal strife plaguing the nation.

The Shanghai Mind of the foreign settlers also believed that the powers must force China to respect the treaties it signed more than half a century earlier. A headline by American Rodney Gilbert, an editor for North China, read: "Every Concession to Chinese Officials means Fresh Attacks on Foreigners: Treaty Violations come from Weakness and Vacillation."

Putnam Weale, an Englishman who was an editor for Peking Leader, notoriously was a proponent of scientific racism. He argued that the Chinese are incapable of leadership in Shanghai and nor can they outpace the productivity of individual foreigners because:

"It has been calculated that the nervous energy of the educated Chinese is 0.24 of the white man; and that of the laborer 0.18...In an office it thus takes four Chinese to do the work of one foreigner, and in manual work five."

The Growing Anti-Imperialist Movement

The moral authority of western powers was increasingly challenged by the growth of radical nationalism in China and also by anti-imperialist sentiment at home in support of the Chinese. The new era of nationalism of the 1920s identified foreigners as the top cause for China's misfortunes, and after 1923, the First United Front began to prepare protest and unionizations of local workers in Shanghai. The foreigners saw two major threats: the external military campaign from Chiang Kai-shek's nationalist armies, and the internal armed rising led by communists backed by the Soviet Union after the recent Russian revolution. A 1923 declaration by A.O. Land, chairman of the Court of Directors of the Hongkong and Shanghai Bank, stated:

"The doctrine that China must work out her own salvation has been tried and found wanting. It is… derided by most intelligent Chinese… We have reluctantly come to the conclusion that the time has come to give foreign interference a trial, not in any aggressive spirit, but with the firm and friendly determination to save the country from the chaotic conditions to which military mis-government and political demoralization have brought it."

In the aftermath of the 1924 Second Zhili–Fengtian War, China found itself in the midst of one of the most destructive periods of turmoil since 1911. The war had involved every major urban area in China, and badly damaged the rural infrastructure. As a result of the conflict the Zhili-controlled government, backed by varied Euro-American business interests, was ousted from power by pro-Japanese warlord Zhang Zuolin, who installed a government led by the generally unpopular statesman Duan Qirui in November 1924. Though victorious, the war left Zhang's central government bankrupt and Duan exercised little authority outside Beijing. Authority in the north of the country was divided between Zhang and Feng Yuxiang, a Soviet Union-backed warlord, and public support for the northern militarists soon hit an all-time low, with southerners openly disparaging provincial governors as junfa (warlords). With his monarchist leanings and strong base in conservative Manchuria, Zhang represented the far right in Chinese politics and could claim few supporters. Meanwhile, the KMT (Nationalist) and the Chinese Communist Party (CCP), allied as the First United Front, were running a diplomatically unrecognized Soviet-backed administration in the southern province of Guangdong.

Alongside public grief at the recent death of China's Republican hero Sun Yat-sen (12 March 1925), the KMT and CCP were particularly involved in unionizing in Shanghai through the far-left Shanghai University. Shanghai's native Chinese were strongly unionised compared to other cities and better educated, and recognised their plight as involving lack of legal factory inspection, recourse for worker grievances or equal rights. Educated Chinese were also offended by the council's plan to introduce a new censorship law, forcing all publications in the Settlement to use the publisher's true name and address.

In 1924, CCP cadres formed a night school in Hsiao-sha-tu bordering Shanghai; this would later turn into the Fu-hsi kung-jen chih-lo-pu, or, The Western Shanghai Workers' Club. During early months of 1925, strikes on those matters intensified. A cotton-mill worker, Sun Liang-hio, a CCP member, was the head of the Western Shanghai Workers' Club. During the early months of 1925, strikes on those matters intensified. Japanese-owned cotton mills were a source of contention, and disputes between Japanese owners and Chinese employees around the #8 Cotton Mill became regular occurrences. In February that year, a dispute between Chinese workers at the No. 8 Mill of the Naigai Wata Kaisha and Japanese management concerning layoffs led to the KMT helping to form the Shanghai Cotton Mill Union during the strike. Although matters were settled, the workers felt unsatisfied about the situation and sought a bigger victory. In early May, workers at Shanghai Naga Wata Kaisha company began striking again in an effort to force company management to negotiate. On 15 May, a Japanese guard employed by the company shot and killed a worker named Ku Chen-hung. The killing resulted in public outrage. The Shanghai Students Union began fundraising campaigns and delivered speeches condemning the killing. The Party also led strikes to shift from the economic struggle to a political struggle against Japanese imperialists and Chinese warlords, eventually turning into an anti-west movement more generally.

A week after the killing, a group of students, heading for Gu's public "state" funeral and carrying banners, were arrested while traveling through the International Settlement. With their trial set for 30 May, various student organisations convened in the days before and decided to hold mass demonstrations across the International Settlement and outside the Mixed Court.

== The Nanjing Road incident ==
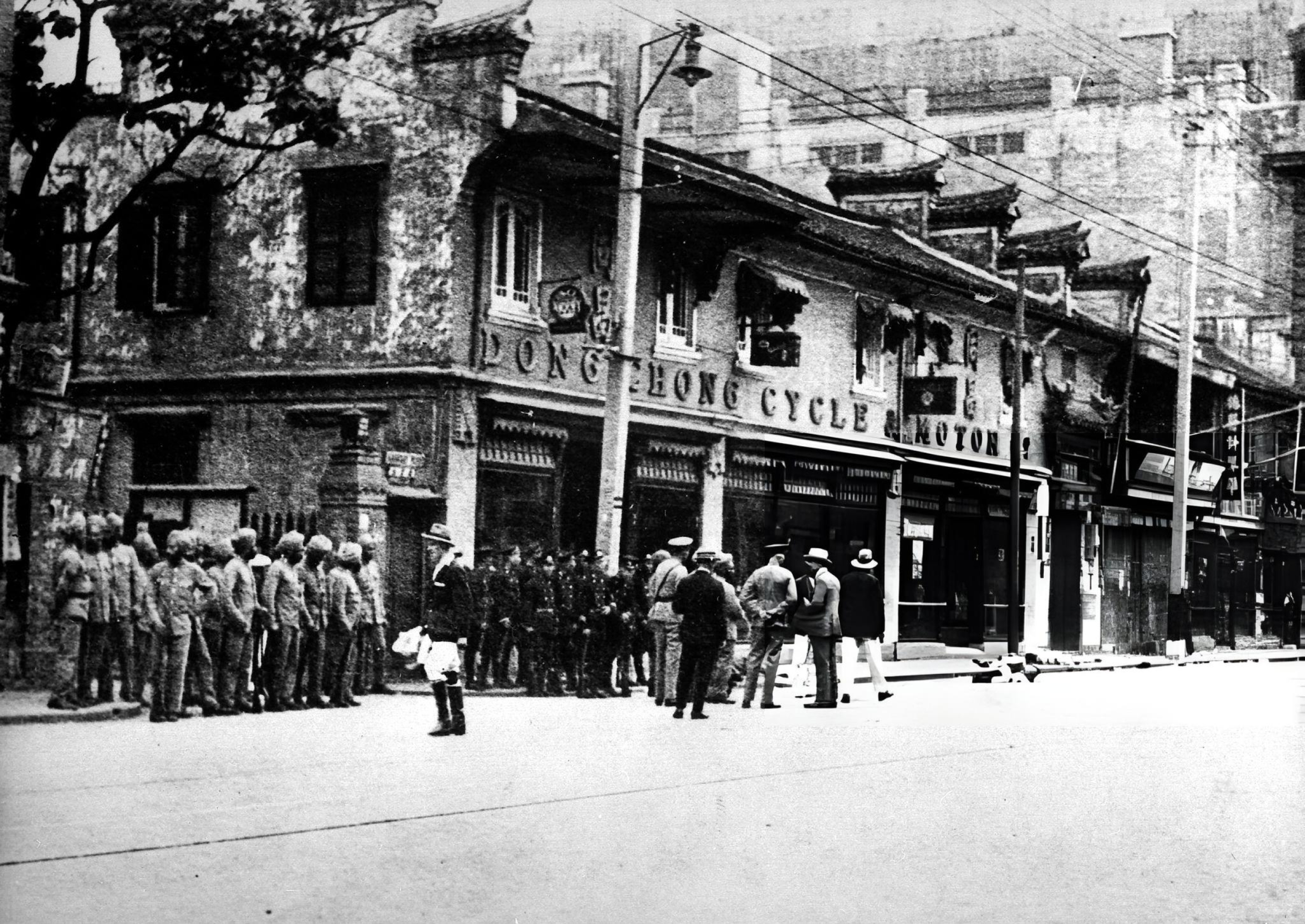
Scene in Nanking Road following the shooting

On 30 May 1925, with the mobilization of students from University of Shanghai, the Chinese Communist Party (CCP) and the trade union, thousands of workers, students and citizens took to the streets and marched towards the British concession on Nanjing Road. The Nanjing Road incident started according to an article on Wenhuinet, immediately after the May Thirtieth Incident, the Central Committee of the Chinese Communist Party held a meeting and decided to launch a general strike, suspension of business, and suspension of classes throughout Shanghai.

Just after the trial of the arrested students began, Shanghai Municipal Police arrested 15 ringleaders of a student protest being held on and around Nanjing Road, in the International Settlement where it is controlled by other countries. The protesters were held in Louza (Laozha) police station, which by 2:45 pm was facing a "huge crowd" of Chinese that had amassed outside. The demonstrators demanded the arrested ringleaders be returned to them. According to the recollections of the eyewitness Ding Jinxian published on Wenhu News, she and five other classmates were escorted into the old gate detention house by the police. Inside the detention center, they witnessed classmate Qu Jingbai being beaten to the point of vomiting and losing teeth by the British police for shouting anti-imperialist slogans.

A picket of police (there was only a skeleton staff of approximately two dozen officers overall, predominantly Sikh and Chinese, with three white officers) was set up to prevent demonstrators from entering the station. Inspector Edward William Everson, station commander and the highest-ranking officer on the scene (as the police commissioner K.J. McEuen had not let early warnings of public demonstrations interfere with his attendance at the city's Race Club) eventually shouted, "Stop! If you do not stop I will shoot!" twice, once in English and once in Wu. A few seconds later, at 3:37 pm, and as the crowd was within six feet of the station entrance, he fired into the crowd with his revolver. The Sikh and Chinese policemen then also opened fire, discharging some 40 rounds. At least 11 demonstrators were killed at the scene, with another five dying later of their injuries. At least 14 injured were hospitalized, with many others wounded.

According to the account of the American witness John Peyton Davis who was present at the scene, a "huge and unusually quiet crowd" had gathered on Nanjing Road. British naval marines and police were positioned at the entrance of the stores. Also, as reported by Wenhu News Network, after the Ministry of Works announced martial law on 1 June, the British and American sailors of the International Merchant Corps and armed patrol officers surrounded University of Shanghai. In the evening of 30 May, the Chinese Communist Party (CCP) decided to advocate for a strike of workers, students, and markets across Shanghai. This decision marked the beginning of a city-wide strike, classes stopped and demonstrations in Shanghai. In the following days, the concession area entered a state of martial law. An article on Wenhu.com states that during the May Thirtieth Movement, the teachers and students of Shanghai University served as the main force of the propaganda team. Many of them were arrested and imprisoned. Subsequently, the school was occupied by the British Marine Corps.

== Strikes and martial law ==
On Sunday, 31 May, crowds of students protested. They, including 1,500 laborers and students, then convened at the Chinese Chamber of Commerce where they gave a list of demands, including punishment of the officers involved in the shooting, an end to extraterritoriality and closure of the Shanghai International Settlement. A representative of the Shanghai Students' Federation further proposed a general strike, prostrating himself on the platform an emotionally appealing to the audience agree with his goals. The Acting Chairman of the Chamber of Commerce, Fong Chu-pa, was summoned following discussions. Under pressures from various groups, he agreed to issue circulars for a general strike on 1 June.

The Municipal Council declared a state of martial law on Monday, 1 June, calling up the Shanghai Volunteer Corps militia and requesting foreign military assistance to carry out raids and protect vested interests. Shanghai University was raided and many students were forced to leave the campus. Following this raid, the universities T'ung-te, Ta-hsia, and Nan-yang soon followed. Furthermore, in Peking (Beijing) over 60 Chinese were killed and over 70 were wounded between 30 May and 10 June. Over the next month Shanghai businesses and workers went on strike. By 10 June, there were about 130,000 workers on strike from 107 foreign establishments and 26,000 from 11 Chinese factories

On 4 November 1925, Cai Hesen's brother, Cai Linzheng, was shot and killed while leading a workers' picket team during the Guangzhou-Hong Kong strike.

The numbers of Chinese killed and injured in the 30 May Movement's protests vary: figures normally vary between 30 and 200 dead, with hundreds injured.

== Aftermath ==
Demonstrations break out in Shanghai

A KMT labor organizer, Ma Ch'ao-chun, called for a mass demonstration in Chiu-mou-ti to show sympathy of the people for the arrested students and the strikers with Shanghai Student's Federation leading the charge. 2000 students were organized into speech squads across the city on the day of the trial for arrested students from Wen-chih University and they asked for contributions from the public to support the strike. Separately, the CCP and KMT held emergency meetings on 28 May to start more demonstrations for 'the combined purpose of further commemorating Ku Cheng-hung and of stimulating an all-out fight against the Treaty Powers' as well as against imperialist forces that impede economic prosperity for workers.

The students appealed to the immediate interests of the populace by denouncing the proposed 'four bills' which would increase wharfage dues, allow complete foreign press control over Chinese newspapers within the Settlement, and regulations of stock exchange and child-labor regulations. This last point is certainly important as it would significantly increase the burden of Chinese merchants and Chinese owned businesses who were at first wary of joining the strike. In the pamphlets they handed out, they listed numerous grievances such as the foreign control of the Chinese customs under the treaty system, the Powers' lending of resources to the warlords, the arrest of protesting workers and students, and the construction of roads outside the settlement without the consent of Chinese authorities.

Right after the Nanking massacre, the KMT leaders also decided to launch a general strike for the workers and students, while the CCP led the protests with the intent to fight against foreign imperialism. Li Li-san, a CCP member, proposed to establish a Shanghai General Labor Union to be organized to include the National Students' Federation, the Shanghai Students' Federation, the Shanghai General Chamber of Commerce, and various unions of merchants what would be organized together to create the Federation of Workers, Merchants, and Students. A tactic to ensure this protest aimed to disrupt western businesses only was to ensure the strike of workers did not spread to Chinese owned factories. Some Chinese shops in the city closed anyways in sympathy for the murdered students.

Starting on 1 June, propaganda cadres were assigned to different parts of the city to explain the origins and development of the May 30th massacre to the workers everyday to keep them informed and encouraged. The Federation covered Shanghai with propaganda pamphlets, pictures, posters with anti-imperialist slogans, though most were quickly taken down by the Settlement police. The Department of Women of the KMT local branch of Shanghai composed a stage drama called 'The Death of Ku Cheng-hung'. Additionally, the Federation sent out propaganda squads of 2–4 to neighboring cities to ask for help with reaching the grass-roots of the Chinese, with each university being assigned to different parts of China. Students would interview shopkeepers and ask that they boycott foreign apparel and materials or close their shops entirely if they were associated with western companies; this would be viewed as traitorous behavior, making those people 'foreign slaves' ().

Ships were held up at the wharves since coolies had joined the strike, except for those at the China Merchants' wharves where they only dealt with Chinese cargo. The sanitary coolies, tramway workers, the bus company, power plants, the telephone company, and most domestic servants in foreign homes also went on strike; even some Chinese policeman joined the strikers' ranks. Tram cars within the Settlement were often targets of Chinese stoning and attacks, and many foreign organizations lost their Chinese employers because of the movement's propaganda. By 10 June, more than 130,000 workers had walked out from 107 foreign establishments. Even the notorious warlord, Chang T'sung-ch'ang, sent $5,000 in solidarity for the strike.

Pushback on Chinese 'Xenophobia' Against Foreigners

During the summer protests, there was a large attempt to paint the students and union workers as anti-democratic and against modern culture, deeming them xenophobic. It was common for western media and newspaper at the time to liken students to the Boxers during the Boxer Rebellion 25 years earlier who had slaughtered tens of thousands of foreign missionaries and Chinese Christians. However, even British backed North China Daily news admitted that modern anti-foreignism was not Boxerism, but "impelled by an intelligent and greatly awakened national consciousness" (). Although some communist supported the Boxers, radicals did not call themselves 'anti-foreign' or, paiwai. Chinese nationalists considered themselves forward looking and progressive, while the paiwai had a reputation that was 'reactionary' and obsolete. Rather, they called themselves patriots and rejected that foreign privilege was the only way for China to be respected on an international stage. In fact, students were recorded as saying that it was not the Chinese, but foreigners who were guilty of the barbarism inflicted by the Boxers because of the ill treatment they have been facing for decades by the western powers. A 1925 Kuomintang statement censured British actions as reprehensible by modern enlightened standards, or wenming; it read that it "ought to make all Christians and Anglo-Saxon lovers of freedom and independence ashamed." There were countless posters plastered on buildings and posts that showed obese British capitalists ordering policeman to fire on defenseless workers and students. Protestors proclaimed not only to 'Kill the foreign devils' or, Sha yangguizi, but 'Abolish the Unequal Treaties!' and 'Down with Imperialism!' After the shooting on 30 May, signs were put up saying: "The Student movement is NOT Bolshevik, NOT Anti-Christian, NOT Anti-Foreign, BUT CRY FOR HUMANITY." Still, communist students at Shanghai University used the paiwai term to describe nationalists because they recognized the need for Soviet aid, believing that China still needs the support of the Comintern.

The North China reminded its readers that the 'allied armies saved China in 1900' and can again accomplish this. Thomas Millard, the founder of the China Weekly Review warned after 30 May that "a serious anti-foreign uprising" could be stopped if the West were to "consider the adoption of a policy designed to arrest the forces of disintegration in China." Nonetheless, the students persisted and on 4 June, the Shanghai Students' Federation formulated 12 demands dealing with negotiations with the British and Japanese. They called for the withdrawal of foreign troops, punishment of the murderers, the abolition of the Mixed Court, the revocation of the 'four bills', and to restore the rights of workers to strike and organize the labor unions.

Western Powers Retreat

By 8 June, there were 26 foreign warships surrounding the settlement and the authorities were backed by military forces from France, America, England, and Japan, to handle the general strike. After the raids, more than 20 Chinese were arrested for tearing down the notices of the Municipal Council and multiple were sent to prison for hurling bricks and stones at police. According to the collections of Ch'en'pao (a daily newspaper) in Peking, more than 60 Chinese were killed and more than 70 were seriously wounded between 30 May and 10 June. Despite this, 70 new labor unions would be established in July, all affiliated with the Shanghai General Labor Union under the control of the CCP. More than half of protestors came from student bodies and used as 'storm troops' for the Party's mass movement. In August 1925, after 3 months of the general strike and anti-British boycotts, trade organizations including the British Chamber of Commerce and the China Association, were close to making concessions to moderate Chinese nationalism. They eventually would state their readiness to seat a Chinese representative on the Council of Shanghai.

The 15 "ringleaders" originally arrested on 30 May were given light or suspended sentences by Shanghai's foreign-run Mixed Court. Two investigations into the events of 30 May were ordered, one by Chinese authorities and one by international appointees, Justice Finley Johnson (presiding), Judge of the Court of First Instance in the Philippines (representing America), Sir Henry Gollan, Chief Justice of Hong Kong (representing Britain) and Justice Kisaburo Suga of the Hiroshima Court of Appeal (representing Japan). The Chinese authorities refused to participate in the international investigation, which found 2–1 that the shooting justifiable. Only the Justice Finley from America disagreed and recommended sweeping changes, including the retirement of the chief of the Settlement Police, Commissioner McEuen, and Inspector Everson. Their forced resignation in late-1925 would be the only official result of the inquiry.

By November, with Chiang Kai-shek having finally wrested power from his rivals after Sun Yat-sen's death and with Chinese businesses wishing to return to operation (the Settlement had begun cutting electricity to Chinese mills), the strikes and protests began to fizzle out. In Hong Kong, however, they would not totally end until mid-1926. The Kuomintang's support for the movement, and its Northern Expedition of 1926–27, eventually led to reforms in the governance of the International Settlement's Shanghai Municipal Council and the beginning of the removal of the Unequal Treaties.

The May Thirtieth events caused the transfer of the Muslim Chengda College and Imam (Ahong) Ma Songting to Beijing. The movement also helped boost the Kuomintang to national hegemony.

Liberal Westerners and Missionaries Fight for Shanghai Independence

In Early 1927, thousands of British and American troops landed in Shanghai to fight against 'militaris, brigandage, and Bolshevism.' Still, few wanted military intervention and western powers believed that the Chinese lacked the patriotism required for real warfare anyhow. Stemming from the 'Shanghai Mind' of western powers who were quickly losing control of their influence in China, they attempted to intimidate the country by displaying their military strength. A 1926 article from the Echo de Chine struck fear in western powers, stating that "we will again see the waves of great Asiatic invasions unleashed against Europe."

Liberal westerners sought out Chinese nationalists (not communists) after the May 30th massacre who were willing to speak about western liberalism in order to gain American and European sympathy. As Kuomintang and Communist labor organizers were busy in the terrible sweatshops of China's mills and factories, westerners were told that labor and humanitarian laws were in place in China except at treaty ports, completely dismissing the current state of the majority of the nation. T.Z. Koo (Gu Ziren) of the Y.M.C.A at St. John's, stated that "Jesus was a nationalist who favored self-determination," appealing to westerners by claiming the Chinese were seeking national independence to progress towards democracy. American backed Chinese liberals (often Christians) denounced communists for having caused the Nanking incident of Marck 1927 when 6 foreigners were killed in order to resonate with the west's anti-communist rhetoric. Liberals had attempted to downplay what was a bloody upheaval to assure that in the revolutionary China of the future, foreign businesses, missionaries, and foreigners would receive the same privileges, if not more, they had before the uprising.

Missionaries from England, France, and America had wanted to renegotiate the unequal treaties and remove protections of extraterritoriality, but began to waver when Nationalists armies began to heavily take over in Shanghai during the great crisis of 1927. Escalation proceeded as the British sent in the Shanghai Defense Force, while the Americans and French thought they were not doing enough to help protect the remaining missionaries in the Shanghai and treaty ports. Americans began to believe they could work with the new Nationalist China emerging, but the North China news and Municipal Council debated against this notion. Many conservatizes claimed that the Chinese revolution after 30 May was a reason not to allow a nationalist uprising at all cost, but liberals argued for even more rapid concessions to win China's alliance.

=== Political ideology ===
The May 30th movement may be considered the greatest anti-imperialist movement China had ever seen. It was said by Frank Rawlinson, in the China Christian Yearbook published in 1926, that "The events of May 30 [1925] in Shanghai have been called 'China's 'Boston Tea Party.' In 1927, 8 years before he would become the de facto leader of the CCP, Mao Tse-tung would say: "A Revolution is not a dinner party. May 30th will be... like the fall of the Bastille in Europe."

The May Thirtieth Movement began a period of increasing radicalization and militancy among China's industrial workers, students, and progressive intellectuals. Through the movement, Chinese workers began to perceive workplace exploitation as being linked to the larger struggle against foreign imperialism. The incident shocked and galvanized China, and the strikes and boycotts quickly spread across the country, bringing foreign economic interests to a near standstill.

The target of public ire moved from the Japanese (for the killing of Ku Chen-Hung) to the British, and Hong Kong was particularly affected, where the strikes were known as the Canton–Hong Kong strike). Further shootings by foreigners upon Chinese protesters occurred at Canton, Mukden and elsewhere.

The Chinese warlords used the incident as a pretext to further their own political aims. While Feng Yuxiang threatened to attack British interests via force and demanded a public apology, Zhang Zuolin, who effectively controlled Shanghai's Chinese outskirts, had his police and soldiers arrest protesters and CCP members and assist the Settlement forces. Historians have linked the radical nationalism rise spurred by the May Thirtieth Movement to the warlord military landscape change during the early 1920s. For example, a local dispute in 1924 escalated into becoming a civil war; thus, "this war of 1924 opened the way for radical nationalism".

It also resulted in a major period of growth for the CCP. By the end of 1925, the number of CCP members had risen to approximately 10,000 from 994 at the time of the Fourth National Congress of the CCP earlier that year. Local CCP committees also expanded rapidly.

== Memorial ==
In the 1990s, the May Thirtieth Movement Monument was installed at People's Park.

== See also ==
- History of the Republic of China
- May Fourth Movement – 1919 Chinese cultural political movement
- Republic of China Armed Forces – Military forces of Taiwan
- Warlord Era – Period of Chinese history (1916–1928)
