= Empire Made Me =

2003 biography

- Author: Robert Bickers
- Subject: Rickard Maurice Tinkler
- Genre: Biography
- Publication date: 2003

Empire Made Me: An Englishman Adrift in Shanghai is the 2003 biography of the Shanghai policeman Richard Maurice Tinkler by the British historian Robert Bickers. Tinkler, a British veteran of World War One turned policeman in interwar Shanghai, was described by Bickers as an extremely tough, able, violent and racist policeman operating in one of the world's most crime-ridden and dangerous cities; who loathed the Chinese as a people and treated them with much brutality. Tinker worked in the Shanghai Municipal Police, the police force of the International Settlement, the district of Shanghai jointly administered by Great Britain and the United States. The New Zealand author John Grant Ross wrote in a review of Empire Made Me that: "Some books get under your skin, keep you awake at night long after you’ve finished reading them. This biography of a policeman in Shanghai’s International Settlement in the 1920s and 1930s is such a book."

== Themes ==
The stated aim of Bickers's book was that: "This book is about Empire, and specifically about the ways in which it shaped and distorted twentieth-century British lives". Bickers argues in this "biography of a nobody" that though Tinkler himself was an unimportant man who achieved a brief moment of fame after his murder in June 1939 when he was bayoneted to death by Japanese Marines, his life as a policeman in Shanghai revealed much about how the British Empire worked in practice. A major theme of Empire Made Me was gender, the roles assigned to the sexes by society, which differs from sex, which describes the biological differences between males and females. Bickers maintained that the British imperial ideology required imperial men to adopt the macho pose of the heroic white man, forever seeking to prove his masculinity by keeping "the natives" whatever they be black, Indian, Asian, etc. in line which was necessary to protect the idealized demure white women from the threat posed by "the natives", who were viewed as seeking to rape white women whenever they had the chance. In this way, Bickers argued that there was a close link between Tinker's racism and his machismo. The American historian Marcia Ristaino described Tinkler as an ultra-aggressive, mindlessly macho policeman whose relationships with women were predictably enough very troubled as his only relationship that ever lasted for a sustained period was with a White Russian émigré woman living in Shanghai who had to depend upon his wages for survival, and even that relationship was fraught with tension.

== Career of the protagonist ==
Bickers spent 13 years researching the life of Tinkler, a working class Englishman born in 1898 and who enlisted in the British Army in 1915 by lying about his age. Decorated and recommended for a commission, Tinkler left the army in August 1919. He promptly joined the Shanghai Municipal Police. After being promoted to the rank of Inspector and employed on both CID and intelligence duties, Tinkler was demoted to sergeant for being drunk on duty. He chose to resign in October 1930 rather than rebuild what had initially been a promising career. Employed five years later as a Shanghai textile mill supervisor, he died in June 1939 after being bayoneted in a clash with Japanese marines.

Much of Tinkler's correspondence survived, which allowed Bickers to vividly explore many aspects of Tinkler's life such as the resentment which he felt as a working-class man looked down upon by the socially superior British residents of Shanghai, his relationships with women, his intense racism and loathing of the Chinese and his macho sense of masculinity. Much of Tinkler's racism stemmed from the experience of a man who spoke with a working class Lancashire accent, despised by his social superiors, which led Tinkler to hate the Chinese with a special intensity as a way of compensation.

The British historian Robert Brown wrote that in "...the 1920s and 1930s the city [Shanghai] was a raucous patchwork of vice, glitz, hedonism and modernity, a thriving transnational metropolis marked by peaks of fortune and gaping chasms of inequality." Brown noted that the Shangahilanders as the white community of Shanghai were known expected men such as Tinkler to be at their service endlessly while looking down upon him as a man from the lower orders of British society, which deeply hurt his ego. Brown noted that one of his colleagues, Joseph Tinkler, was related to Maurice Tinkler, which led him to write: "It fascinated me that two people from the same family line, Joseph and ‘Maurice’ could live such divergent lives. M's was a far darker story, and it shocked me that we mild mannered men such as Joseph, we same Britons, could be related to these rough specimens of masculinity and casual brutality. The trauma of the trenches formed the finishing school for Maurice's manhood, and Bickers notes that his approval for violent problem solving, shaped by war, bordered on the Fascist. Or was it because Shanghai went to his head, the intoxicating impact of the world's most vibrant city on a small town mind, the determination to squeeze what superiority he could from a contemporary hierarchy that placed him above the many Chinese he policed? The two factors muddied together in a heady mélange of duty, debauchery, and dull aggression. He also appears to have been an effective policeman, at least for a time, using his military skills to gain promotion to the rank of detective". Brown noted that Tinker only achieved fame when his death at the hands of Japanese marines in 1939 briefly made him frontpage news in his native Britain.

== Reception ==
One reviewer noted how Tinkler was something of a fascist in terms of personality, if not politics writing that:

"Bickers tried to design the book as one about colonialism, but the story kept frustrating anything so simple. In many ways, this is a story about policing, about modernity, about the ways fascism didn’t take in British culture and the ways it did, and about emigration. Tinkler’s letters, which survive, show him becoming an angrier and angrier man, an expat with a grudge against the world. But this doesn’t reduce to mere racism, as the races he despised included the Scots, former members of the Royal Navy, and the British public (in his words “the most prejudiced, uneducated, ignorant people in the world”). In fact, he sounds more like a classic fascist, craving war and glorying in contempt for the masses, whoever they were."

The American historian Carolyn Wakeman praised Bickers for his colorful and evocative portrayal of Shanghai as experienced by Tinkler, a dedicated policeman who walked the beat in one of the world's most violent and dangerous cities. Wakeman noted that Tinker was an unlikeable man, an intensely racist policeman with anger issues and a violent streak, and felt it was a tribute to Bicker's work as an historian that he was able to craft a fascinating story out of Tinkler's life. Wakeman noted it was no surprise that Tinker died violently and gruesomely in 1939 at the hands of the Japanese. Wakeman felt that Bicker's attention to class, race and gender was important as Tinkler initially liked Shanghai when he arrived in 1919, calling the city the "Paradise of Adventurers", and tellingly a place where he could be "someone else". Tinkler felt very much threatened by the rising Chinese nationalism that began with the May Fourth Movement in 1919 that sought to evict the British from their concessions in China, most notably in Shanghai, the most modern and relatively prosperous city in China. Wakeman praised the way that Bickers was able to "deftly" recreate the life of Tinker via his letters, PRO records, newspaper accounts, guidebooks, family histories, local archives and interviews. She praised the way that Bickers sought to link Tinkler with the present as Bickers wrote: "Empire was-and is now-a normal part of the physical and mental landscape of all Britons".

Jonathan Mirsky in his review of Empire Made Me thought the title was misleading as he felt the focus of the book was on the International Settlement and the Shanghai Municipal Police force instead of Tinkler. Mirsky believed the story of Tinkler can never really be known, through he noted that Tinkler was responsible for the self-destructive course he pursued that led to his murder.

Marcia R. Ristaino in her review of Empire Made Me described Tinkler as "a rather dashing young man who is intelligent and ambitious" who after his honorable discharge from the British Army in 1919 decided almost upon a whim to join the Shanghai Municipal Police out of a sense of adventure. Ristaino felt the story told in Empire Made Me was a tragedy as an intelligent man whose personality was well suited to police work fell into a self-destructive spiral of heavy drinking, broken relationships with every women who ever loved him, resentment at the Shanghailanders and rage issues. Ristanio wrote that: "This view of empire, as seen from the bottom rung, shows the clear divisions between those who are recognized as pukka, enjoying enormous privileges, many at the expense of the Chinese, and those other whites who must struggle interminably against their countrymen's class discrimination, snobbery, and their own false illusions." Ristanio wrote that the most notable aspects of Tinkler was his "extreme racism and proclivity for violence. Time and again his convictions of racial superiority over the Chinese are expressed. It is not difficult to predict that these personal traits, along with his heavy drinking and womanizing, all so readily available in Shanghai at this time, will eventually spell disaster." Ristanio concluded that the story of Empire Made Me was the "...life of an ordinary Britisher, sucked into the design and requirements of empire service, who becomes shaped and often distorted by its very force. Tinkler, by his own frustrations, violence, and racism, forfeits the personal qualities and talents that might have served him well in life."

The British historian James Schoonmaker wrote that Empire Made Me was a fascinating book that brought to life a man otherwise forgotten. Schoolmaker praised the way that Bickers offered "a window into an otherwise closed world" that revealed much about the British empire as though Shanghai was part of China, the International Settlement was not, and this contrast to the way that two worlds faced each other revealed much. Schoolmaker concluded: "Beyond ruminating on the ‘silence’ left by the absence of source materials so familiar to social historians, Bickers explores the humanity behind the functionary and so goes some way towards giving historical life to someone who would have otherwise remained a narrative function – simply an ‘imperialist’ or a ‘policeman’. That is not to say that Tinkler deserves our unquestioning sympathy. What can at times be a heart-breaking narrative can also reveal the ugliest of prejudice and character. Perhaps that's what makes the book so appealing and a must-read for students of both Britain and Empire, as well as general historians."

The American historian Karen Fang praised Bickers for his treatment of gender, writing:

"Gender is a recurring aspect of Bickers’ narrative, which thoughtfully illustrates how the strong masculinity essential to British imperial ideology required constant performance and self-indoctrination—a telling instability in Tinkler’s history that suggests how empire was already breaking down...A sympathetic but still critical text, Empire Made Me refuses to romanticize either the cosmopolitan exoticism of contemporary Shanghai or the quotidian violence of colonial policing. As Bickers puts it, in another comparison to a pathbreaking historigraphical work that clearly influenced him, Tinkler resembles the “ordinary men” Christopher Browning has described in the Polish police reserves during the German occupation, for whom Jewish extermination was part of their daily commission." [Fang is referring to Browning's 1992 book Ordinary Men about the German Reserve Police Battalion 101 who shot down much of the Jewish population in south-eastern Poland in 1942-43]

By contrast, Ross in a 2015 review felt that the book was somewhat "politically correct" in its harsh assessment of the British Empire and noted the problem of researching the life of an ordinary man, writing:

"Robert Bickers is, as you’d expect with a career academic, no apologist for the British empire. We’re told that British rule in treaty ports such as Shanghai was racist and cruel. However, we’re not given any reference points for comparison. What was the state of Chinese law and order outside the foreign settlements? How was the policing in Shanghai before and after the SMP period? Much worse of course. Then there’s the inconvenient fact that the great majority of the population in the small International Settlement was Chinese – and that they had moved there of their own free will...

Many books on the old Shanghai describe the decadence and glamour, the shocking contrasts of wealth and poverty, the whores, gangsters, and foreign elites. Empire Made Me has plenty of background colour, but the focus is on the daily graft of the cogs of empire: men like Tinkler. In a biography of an ordinary man, however, Bickers faces the inevitable difficulty of a lack of evidence. There were letters to Tinkler’s sister and documents from British and Chinese archives, though not much else. The result is gaps in the story – such as several missing years in the early 1930s; Bickers actually has included a chapter titled “What We Can’t Know.”"

Ross argued that the book was unfair in the sense that it was difficult to fully understand Tinkler today given that so much of his life went undocumented such as the "missing years" from 1931 to 1934, that such flaws were a tribute to how "thought-provoking" Empire Made Me was, and that a less ambitious historian than Bickers would have produced a less interesting book.

== Articles ==
- Wakeman, Carolyn (Spring 2004). "Review of Empire Made Me: An Englishman Adrift in Shanghai". China International Review. 11 (1): 25–27.
- Ristaino, Marcia R. (June 2006). "Review of Empire Made Me: An Englishman Adrift in Shanghai". Journal of World History. 17 (2): 240–241.
