= Alan Maxwell Boisragon =

British soldier and colonial officer (1860–1922)

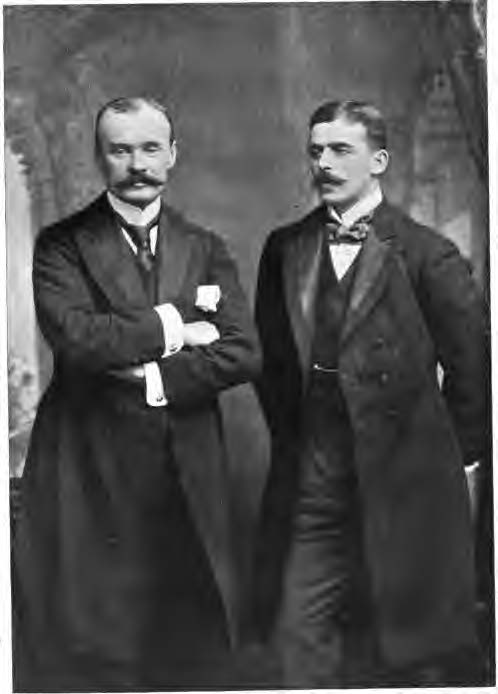
- Frontispiece portrait from Boisragon's The Benin Massacre; Boisragon on left, District Commissioner Locke on right
- Born: 22 January 1860; Bengal, British India
- Died: 18 March 1922 (aged 62); London, England
- Education: Royal Military College, Sandhurst
- Spouse: Ethel Rosling (m. 1893)
- Children: 1 daughter
- Relatives: Ethel Grimwood (half-sister)
- Military career
- Allegiance: United Kingdom
- Branch: British Army
- Unit: Royal Irish Regiment
- Conflicts: Nile expedition
- Other work: Author and Captain Superintendent of the Shanghai Municipal Police

Alan Maxwell Boisragon (22 January 1860 – 18 March 1922) was a British Army officer, and author, and was Captain Superintendent of the Shanghai Municipal Police from 1901 to 1906.

== Life ==
Born in Bengal, India, on 22 January 1860, the son of an army officer of Huguenot ancestry, Major-General Theodore Boisragon, CB, A. M. His father divorced his wife, Margaret Emma Boisragon (born Gerrard), in 1864 after she ran off with Charles William Moore, a judge in Bengal. Charles and Margaret's children included Ethel Moore, his half-sister, who was born in 1867.

Boisragon entered the Royal Military College, Sandhurst in 1878, and served in the Royal Irish Regiment—with seven years in India, and action in the 1884-85 Nile expedition—until 1891, when he retired. He joined the colonial service in the Gold Coast, where he initially served as Assistant Inspector of Constabulary. In 1894 he was appointed Commandant of the newly established Niger Coast Protectorate Force, in which position he came to know Roger Casement. In January 1897 he was only one of two survivors of a small British expedition to Benin which was ambushed en route, the incident prompting the Benin Expedition of 1897. Boisragon published his account of the incident as The Benin Massacre in 1897. He then rejoined the Royal Irish Regiment as a captain in the 3rd Battalion, its Militia battalion.

In early 1901 Boisragon was seconded from the army, and appointed Captain Superintendent of the Shanghai Municipal Police, arriving in March 1901 to take over command. He was forced to resign in the aftermath of the 1905 Shanghai Mixed Court Riot. In 1915 Boisragon published a book for boys, Jack Scarlett Sandhurst cadet: A story for boys, with illustrations by J. F. Campbell. He died in London on 18 March 1922.

== Family ==
He married Ethel Rosling on 9 January 1893 at South Nutfield, Christ Church, Surrey, England. Their son Leslie Alan Maxwell Boisragon was born in 1909 in Shanghai, China.

Boisragon's first cousin Guy Hudleston Boisragon was awarded the Victoria Cross in 1891.

== Bibliography ==
- Captain Alan Boisragon, The Benin Massacre (London: Methuen, 1897)
- https://www.oxforddnb.com/display/10.1093/ref:odnb/9780198614128.001.0001/odnb-9780198614128-e-90000369344
