= Robert Bickers =

British historian (born 1964)

Robert A. Bickers FBA
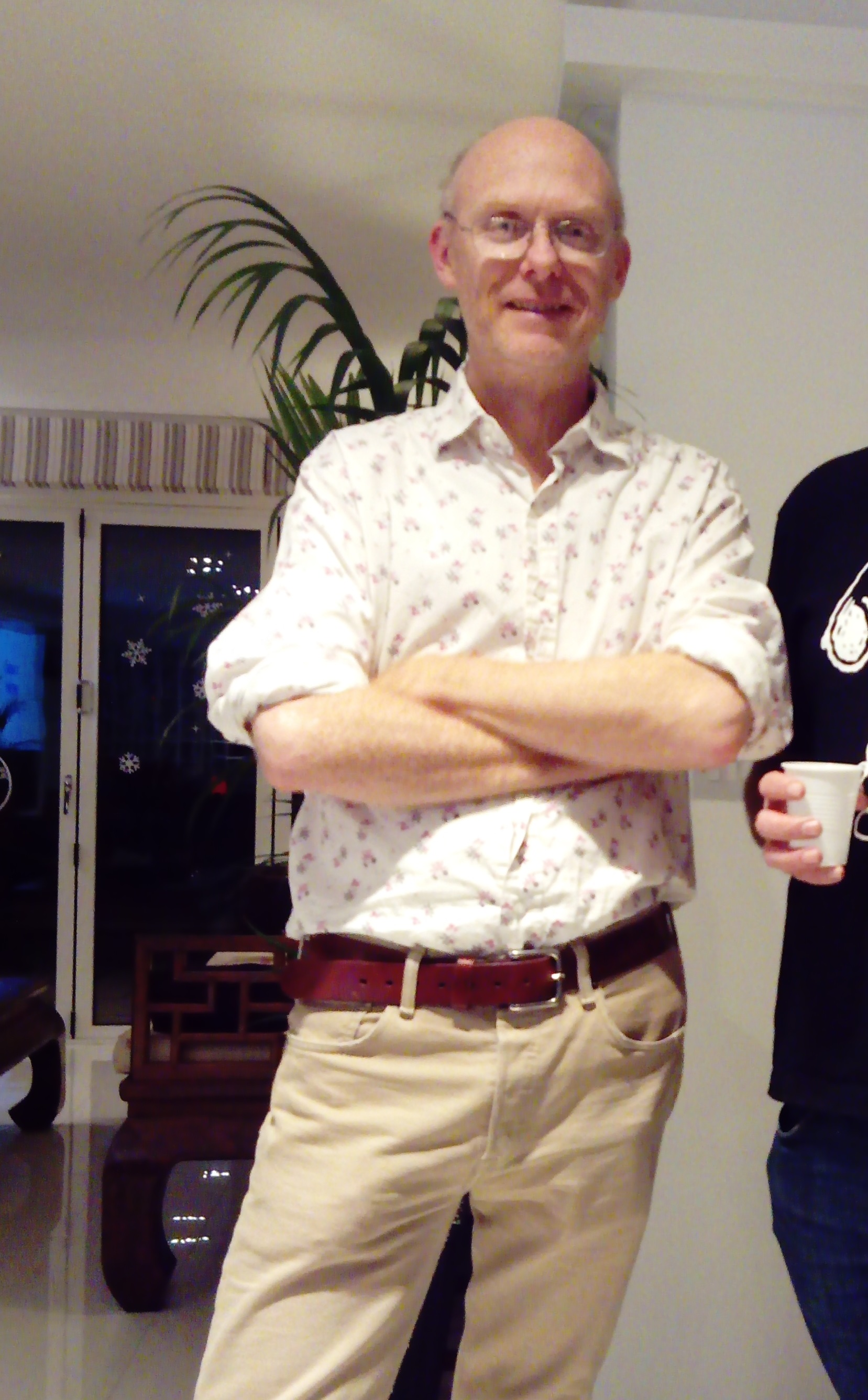
- Robert Bickers in 2017
- Born: Robert Bickers; Wiltshire, England
- Education: SOAS University of London
- Occupation: Historian

Robert A. Bickers FBA (born 1964) is a British historian of modern China and colonialism. He is currently a professor of history at the University of Bristol. Bickers is the author of six books and editor or co-editor of three more.

== Biography ==
Born in a Royal Air Force hospital in Wiltshire, UK, Bickers grew up living on Royal Air Force bases across England, in Germany, and in Hong Kong. He studied Chinese language at SOAS University of London during the mid-1980s, including a year studying in Taiwan. After holding fellowships in Oxford University and Cambridge University, Bickers joined the department of history at the University of Bristol in 1997, where he is currently a professor of history and associate pro vice-chancellor. He was elected a Fellow of the British Academy in 2023.

== Scholarship ==
Bickers' book Out of China was shortlisted for the 2018 Wolfson History Prize. Rana Mitter in the New York Review of Books described it as "a panoramic examination of the increasingly powerful articulation of China's national identity in the twentieth century and the country's painful encounter with Western imperialism." Empire Made Me: An Englishman Adrift in Shanghai (Allen Lane/Penguin and Columbia Univ. Press, 2003) was awarded the Morris D. Forkosch Prize of the American Historical Association.

Bickers directs the Hong Kong History Project and the Historical Photographs of China digitization initiative. He is the former co-director of the British Inter-university China Centre and the REACT Knowledge Exchange Hub and is currently associate pro vice-chancellor (PGR) at the University of Bristol.

== Published works ==
- China Bound: John Swire & Sons and Its World (Bloomsbury, 2020)
- Out of China: How the Chinese Ended the Era of Western Domination (Allen Lane, 2017) ISBN 978-0718192396
- Getting Stuck In for Shanghai: Putting the Kibosh on the Kaiser from the Bund (Penguin, 2014) ISBN 978-0143800293
- The Scramble for China: Foreign Devils in the Qing Empire, 1832-1914 (Allen Lane/Penguin, 2011) ISBN 978-0713997491
- Empire Made Me: An Englishman Adrift in Shanghai (Allen Lane/Penguin, 2003) ISBN 978-0141011950
- Britain in China (Allen Lane/Penguin, 1999) ISBN 978-0719056970

Edited works:

- Settlers and Expatriates: Britons Over the Seas (Oxford History of the British Empire, 2014) ISBN 9780198703372
- Britain and China, 1840-1970: Empire, Finance, and War co-edited with Jonathan J. Howlett ISBN 978-0415658768
- Treaty Ports in Modern China: Law, Land & Power (Routledge Studies in the Modern History of Asia, 2018) co-edited with Isabella Jackson ISBN 978-1138477407
