= 1895 County Championship =

English cricket tournament

- Cricket format: First-class cricket (3 days)
- Tournament format: League system
- Champions: Surrey (5th title)
- Participants: 14
- Matches: 131
- Most runs: Bobby Abel (1,787 for Surrey)
- Most wickets: Tom Richardson (239 for Surrey)

The 1895 County Championship was the sixth officially organised running of the County Championship, and ran from 6 May to 2 September 1895. Surrey claimed their fifth title, which was decided by the percentage of completed matches by each team.

The competition saw the first participation in the competition by Derbyshire, Essex, Hampshire, Leicestershire and Warwickshire.

== Table ==
- One point was awarded for a win, and one point was taken away for each loss. Final placings were decided by dividing the number of points earned by the number of completed matches (i.e. those that ended in win or loss).

Team	Pld	W	T	L	D	A	Pts	Fin	%Fin
Surrey	26	17	0	4	5	0	13	21	61.91
Lancashire	22	14	0	4	3	1	10	18	55.56
Yorkshire	26	14	0	7	5	0	7	21	33.33
Gloucestershire	18	8	0	6	4	0	2	14	14.29
Derbyshire	16	5	0	4	7	0	1	9	11.11
Middlesex	18	6	0	6	6	0	0	12	0.00
Warwickshire	18	6	0	6	6	0	0	12	0.00
Somerset	18	6	0	8	3	1	–2	14	–14.29
Essex	16	5	0	7	4	0	–2	12	–16.67
Hampshire	16	6	0	9	1	0	–3	15	–20.00
Sussex	18	5	0	9	4	0	–4	14	–28.57
Leicestershire	16	3	0	10	3	0	–7	13	–53.85
Nottinghamshire	16	3	0	10	3	0	–7	13	–53.85
Kent	18	3	0	11	4	0	–8	14	–57.14

== Leading averages ==
Most runs
Aggregate	Average	Player	County
1,787	51.05	Bobby Abel	Surrey
1,446	43.81	Albert Ward	Lancashire
1,424	50.85	W. G. Grace	Gloucestershire
1,364	41.33	K. S. Ranjitsinhji	Sussex
1,167	27.13	John Tunnicliffe	Yorkshire

Most wickets
Aggregate	Average	Player	County
239	13.78	Tom Richardson	Surrey
182	13.71	Arthur Mold	Lancashire
136	14.80	Bobby Peel	Yorkshire
130	16.93	George Hirst	Yorkshire
124	12.58	Charlie Townsend	Gloucestershire
