= James Wallace Quinton =

James Wallace Quinton CSI (1834–1891) was a British colonial administrator who served as Chief Commissioner of Assam from 1889 until his death. He was murdered by a hostile crowd whilst trying to impose British rule in the sovereign state on Manipur.

== Life ==
Quinton was born the son of a wine merchant in Enniskillen, County Fermanagh, Ireland, and was educated at Trinity College, Dublin, and graduated BA in 1853. He subsequently served as secretary and president of the University Philosophical Society.

Having been appointed to the Bengal civil service in 1856, he served in the North-West Provinces and Oudh until 1875, when he officiated for two years as judicial commissioner in Burma. Returning to the North-West Provinces in 1877, he was appointed magistrate and collector of the Allahabad district in April 1877, and officiating civil and sessions judge in April 1878. He was on special duty in July 1878 at Naini Tál as a member of the North-West Provinces famine commission. He afterwards served as commissioner in the Jhánsi and Lucknow divisions, and in February 1883 was appointed an additional member of the governor-general's council, an office which he held in 1884, and again in 1886 and 1889. In the earlier of those years he was an ardent supporter of Lord Ripon's policy, which the majority of Anglo-Indians strongly disapproved. In 1884 he was appointed commissioner of the Agra division, and became a member of the board of revenue in 1885. He served as a member of the public service commission in 1886. He was gazetted CSI in 1887, and was appointed chief commissioner of Assam on 22 October 1889.

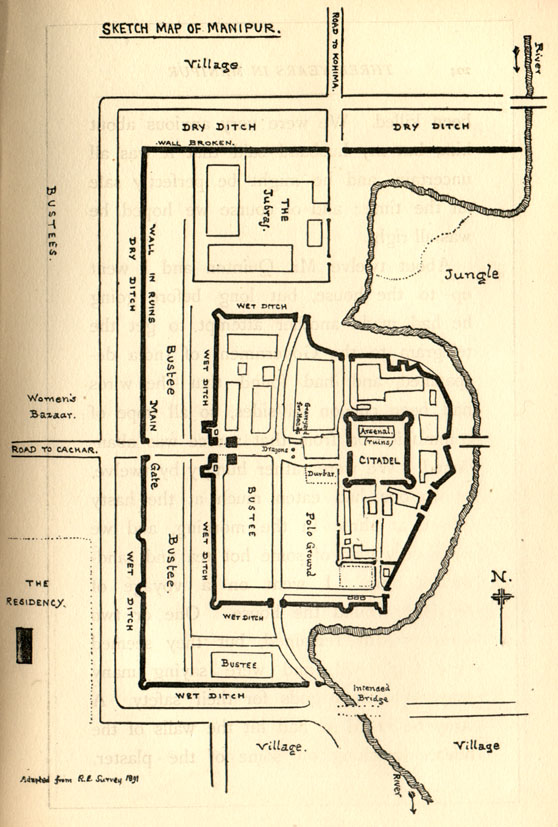
A sketch map of Manipur by Ethel Grimwood showing the residency and key buildings

In March 1891, owing to a rebellion having broken out in the small native state of Manipur, led by two of the younger brothers of the rájá, who abdicated and took refuge at Calcutta, Quinton was sent to Manipur with an escort of five hundred Ghurkhas, and with instructions to recognise as the ruler of the state the second brother, who was acting as regent, and to arrest one of the younger brothers, Tikendrajit. Quinton reached Manipur on 22 March, and at once summoned a durbar, at which he intended to arrest the sínapati. Tikendraji, did not attend, and upon an attempt being made on the following day to arrest him in the fort, resistance was met by the Manipur troops, and was followed by an attack upon the British residency and camp, attended by considerable slaughter. Quinton thereupon offered to treat with the rebels, and was induced to repair to the fort, accompanied by Frank St. Clair Grimwood, the political agent, by Colonel Skene, the officer commanding the Ghurkhas, and by two other officers, all without arms. Immediately on their arrival they were taken prisoners and murdered. Quinton's hand was cut off, his body hacked to pieces, and his dismembered limbs thrown outside the city walls to be devoured by pariah dogs. Manipur was subsequently retaken by a British force; the sínapati was hanged, and the regent deposed. A young boy belonging to the family was recognised as rájá, and during his minority the government of the state was entrusted to a British officer as political resident. Pensions of 300l. and 100l. a year respectively were granted to Quinton's widow and mother. Ethel Grimwood was declared the hero of the event and she received over £1,000 and £140 per year.
