= List of endemic birds of the Andaman and Nicobar Islands =

The Andaman and Nicobar Islands, a union territory of India, is home to 28 species of endemic birds. The islands were formed by the collision of the Indian plate with the Burma plate. Birds were deposited on the islands likely due to environmental factors and evolved separately from the mainland species.

== Threats ==
The endemic birds of the islands face many threats, mostly due to an increase in tourism and habitat destruction. Many of the island's endemic birds are restricted to just a few islands, one of the best examples of this is the Narcondam hornbill, which is found only in the Narcondam Island Wildlife sanctuary. It is threatened by the introduction of feral cats in the sanctuary. The fauna and flora of the sanctuary could be severely impacted by the Great Nicobar Island Development Project.

== Endemic bird areas ==
BirdLife International defines Endemic Bird Areas (EBAs) as places where the breeding ranges of two or more range-restricted species—those with breeding ranges of less than 50,000 km^{2} (19,000 sq mi)—overlap. In order to qualify, the whole of the breeding range of at least two range-restricted species must fall entirely within the EBA. Each of the island groups thus qualifies as an EBA.

- The Andaman Islands (EBA 125)
- The Nicobar Islands (EBA 126)

=== Andaman Islands ===
The BirdLife International EBA 125, or the Andaman Islands, is the Endemic Bird Area that covers the Andaman Islands and the Coco Islands. This EBA has moderate habitat loss and is a high-importance bird area.

Eight species are endemic to this EBA, according to BirdLife International (threatened birds are in bold)-

- **Andaman serpent eagle**
- Andaman crake
- Andaman coucal
- Andaman scops owl
- **Narcondam hornbill**
- **Andaman woodpecker**
- Andaman drongo
- **Andaman treepie**

=== Nicobar Islands ===
The BirdLife International EBA 126, or the Nicobar Islands, is the Endemic Bird Area that covers the Nicobar Islands. This EBA is also of high-importance and has had moderate habitat loss.

Four species are endemic to this EBA, according to BirdLife International (threatened birds are in bold)-

- **Great Nicobar serpent eagle**
- **Nicobar sparrowhawk**
- Nicobar parakeet
- Nicobar bulbul

== Species ==
The following is a list of species endemic to the Andaman and Nicobar Islands, India:

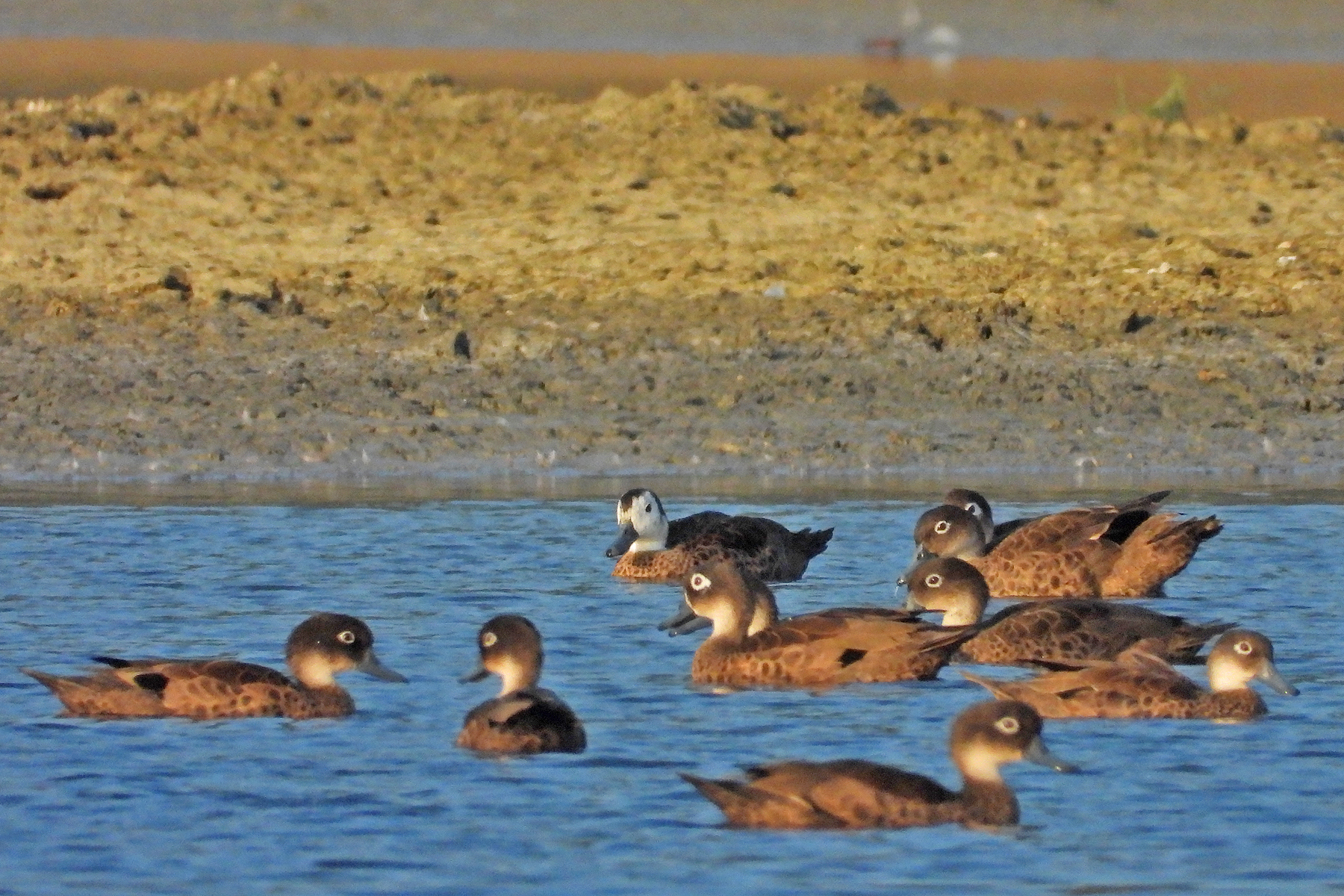
Andaman teal

=== Andaman teal (Anas albogularis) ===
The Andaman teal, also known as the grey teal, was formerly considered to be a subspecies of the Sunda teal. It is found throughout the Andaman islands, with a single record in the Coco islands. It has an IUCN status of Near-threatened, with an estimated population of over 1000 mature individuals. Human interference, due to fishing and irrigation is noticeable. Very little of its natural habitat is protected.

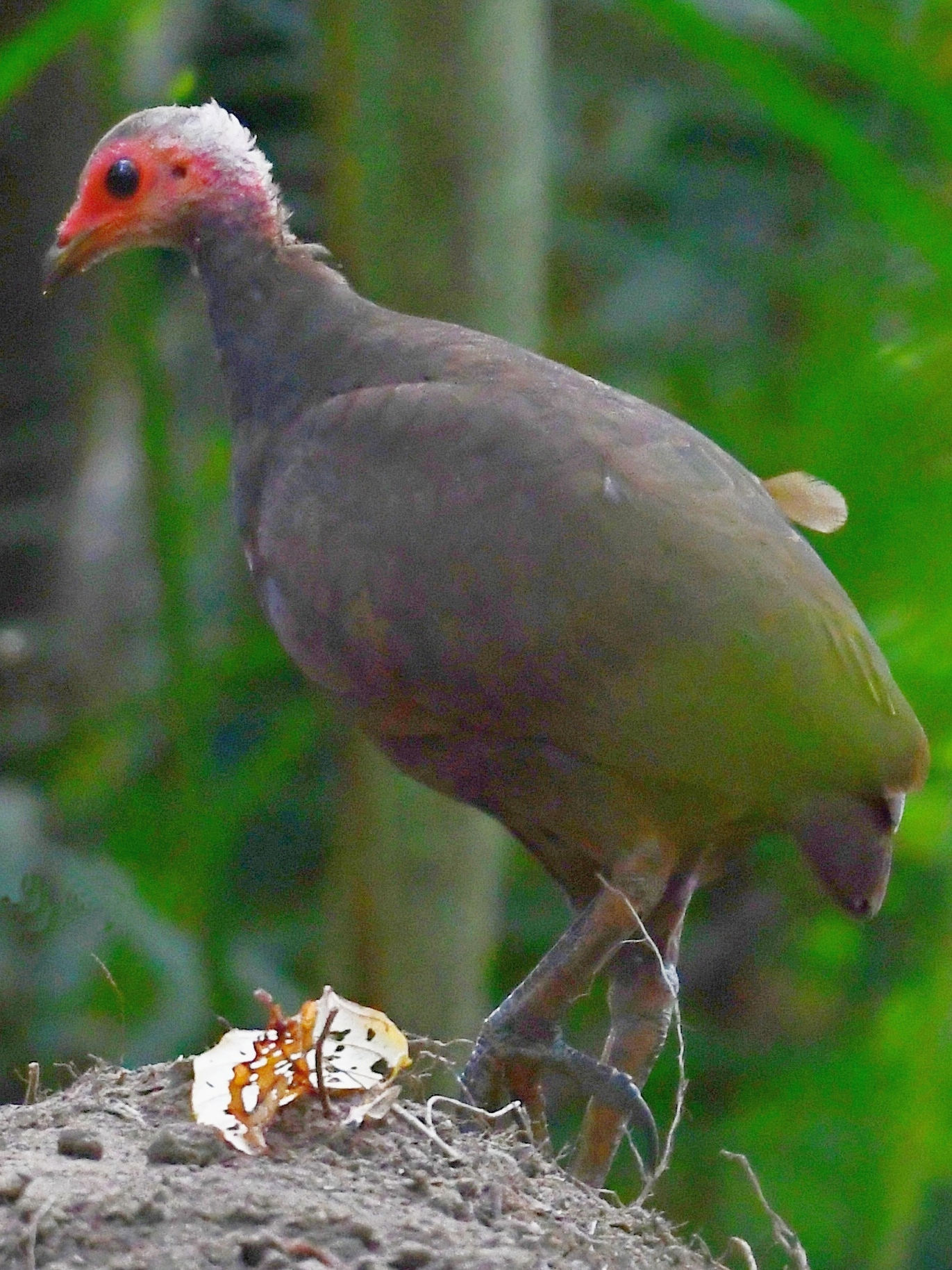
Nicobar megapode

=== Nicobar megapode (Megapodius nicobariensis) ===
The Nicobar megapode, also known as the Nicobar scrubfowl, is the only megapode in South Asia. It was likely separated after the islands separated from the mainland, causing it to evolve into a new species after long periods of isolation. The species is distributed on the Nicobars and surrounding islands, but there have been 19th century reports of the species on the Coco Islands, which suggest that this species was once found on the Andamans but was extirpated from the islands by local tribes. It has an IUCN status of Vulnerable, with a stable population of 750 to 1500 mature individuals. The 2004 Indian Ocean earthquake and tsunami is said to have wiped out a large number of these birds.

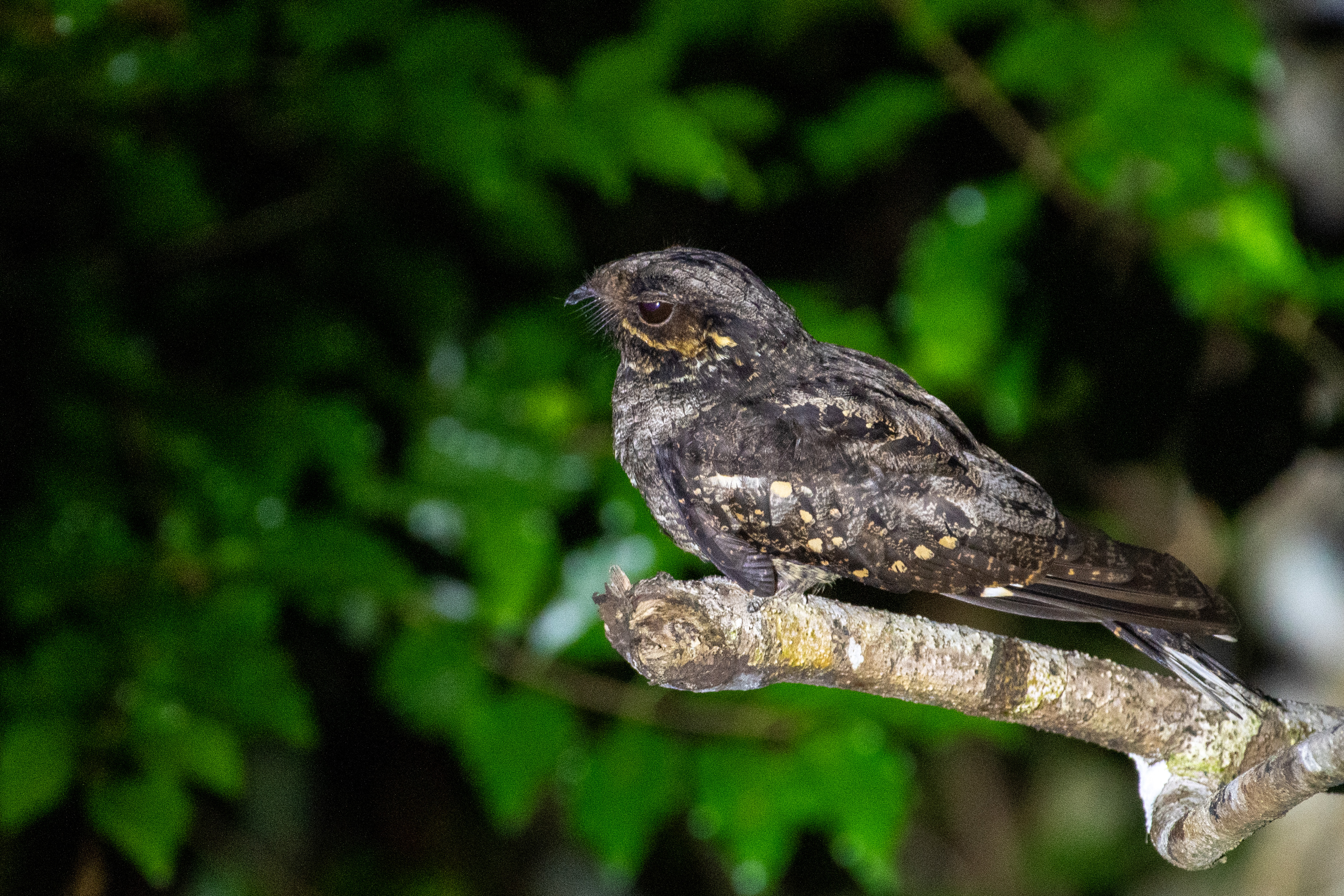
Andaman nightjar

=== Andaman nightjar (Caprimulgus andamanicus) ===
The Andaman nightjar is one the five species of nightjar that inhabits the Andamans. It is considered distinct from the Large-tailed nightjar due to its different morphology. It also differs from its call, which a tyuk without the following tremolo that the call of the large-tailed nightjar. It is distributed throughout the Andaman Islands and associated islets, with a possible record from Narcondam Island. The species is not globally threatened.

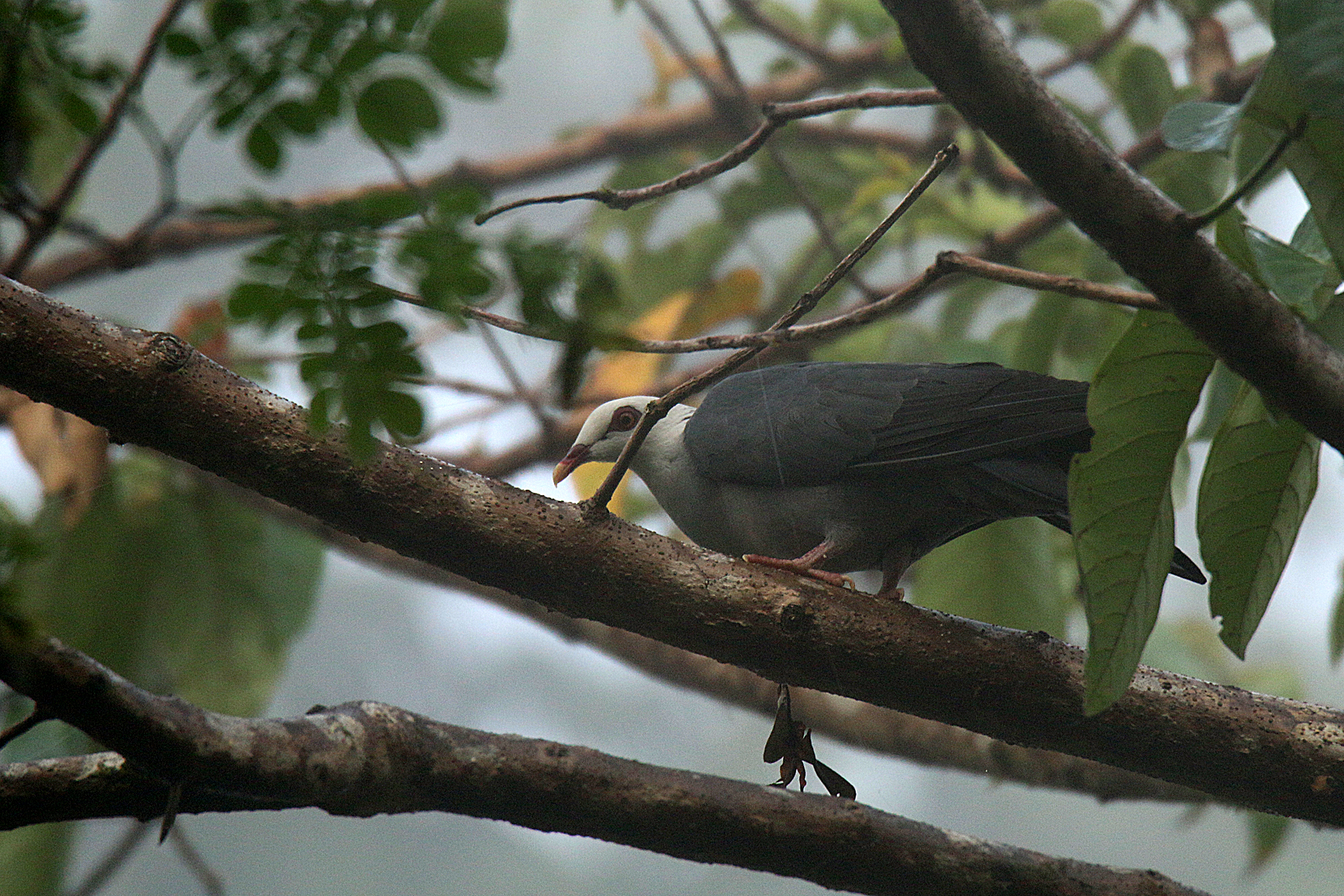
Andaman wood pigeon

=== Andaman wood pigeon (Columba palumboides) ===
The Andaman wood pigeon is a little-known species, distributed throughout the Andaman and Nicobar Islands in or near fruiting trees. It occasionally flies from island to island, crossing straits in search of fruiting trees (this behavior is also seen the fruit doves of Oceania). It occupies dense broadleaved evergreen forests. It is the state bird of the union territory of Andaman and Nicobar Islands. It has an IUCN status of Near-threatened, with a population of 2500-10000 mature individuals.

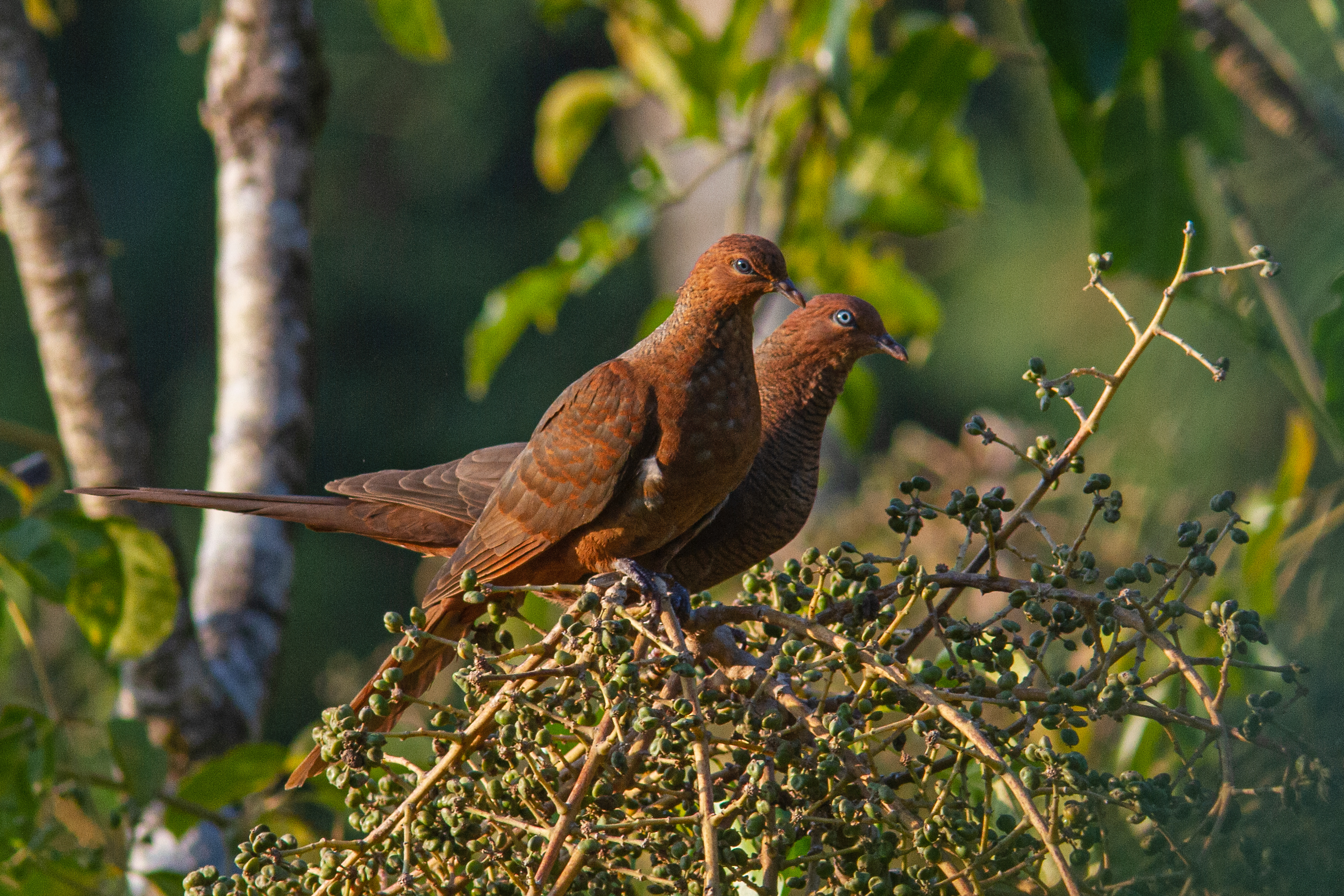
Andaman cuckoo-dove

=== Andaman cuckoo-dove (Macropygia rufipennis) ===
The Andaman cuckoo-dove is another little-known species which is distributed over the two island groups (race andamanica in the Andamans and race rufipennis in the Nicobars). It and other closely related species are called cuckoo-doves due to the fact that they resemble cuckoos both visually and while calling. This species was threatened due to habitat destruction until 2017. The species currently has an IUCN status of Least Concern, although its population is expected to be declining.

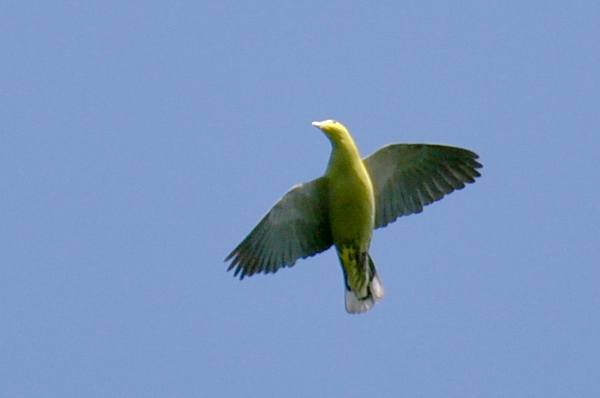
Andaman green pigeon

=== Andaman green pigeon (Treron chloropterus) ===
The Andaman green pigeon was split in 2014 from the pompadour green pigeon complex. It is widely distributed over the two islands groups (it is found in 29 out of the 45 islands in the Andaman group), though it is more common in the Andaman group because of hunting in its Nicobar range. A 2020 study also recorded it on Coco Island. It is under pressure from human population growth. This species currently has a IUCN status of Near-threatened, with an estimated population size of nearly 10,000.

Nicobar imperial pigeon

=== Nicobar imperial pigeon (Ducula nicobarica) ===
The Nicobar imperial pigeon was split from the green imperial pigeon based on differences in plumage and vocalizations. It is found in the Nicobar islands. It is a very little-known species as it was considered a part of the green imperial pigeon for a long time. It has not been evaluated by the IUCN, but is considered Near-threatened on the national level. It remains common on smaller islands, despite extensive hunting which has caused severe declines in many islands, such as Car Nicobar.

=== Andaman crake (Rallina canningi) ===
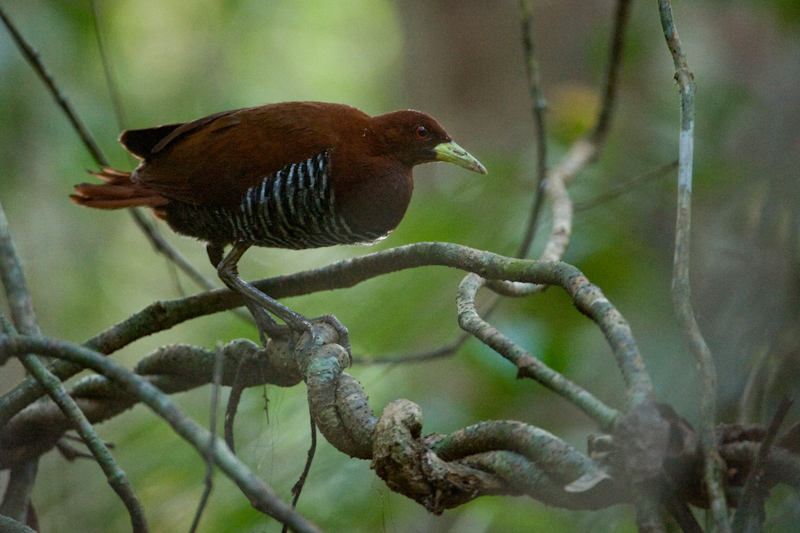
Andaman crake

The Andaman crake is the largest Rallina crake, measuring up to 34 centimeters. It is native to the Andaman islands, but it may also be present in the Coco islands. It is quite common in its habitat, usually marshlands inside tropical and subtropical mangrove forests. It was earlier listed as Data-deficient, but is now listed as Least Concern. It has a population of about 6700-17.000. It is threatened by habitat destruction and introduced predators.

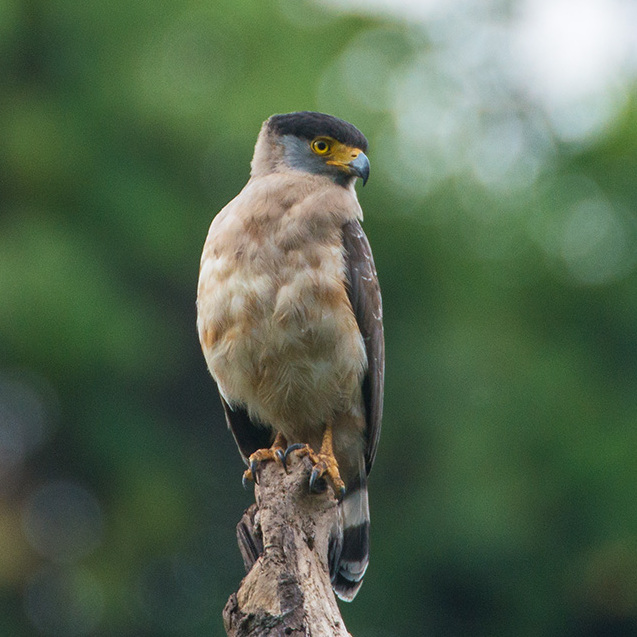
Great Nicobar serpent eagle

=== Great Nicobar serpent eagle (Spilornis klossi) ===
The Great Nicobar serpent eagle, also known as the South Nicobar serpent eagle, is a bird of prey distributed on Great Nicobar Island, as well as Katchal Island and other islands of the Nicobars. It was once considered as a subspecies of the Central Nicobar serpent eagle, which is now a subspecies of the Crested serpent eagle. It occurs most frequently in the canopy of trees. It is considered as Endangered by the IUCN due to habitat destruction caused by the increasing human settlements on the island. The estimated population is somewhere between 100 and 370 mature individuals.

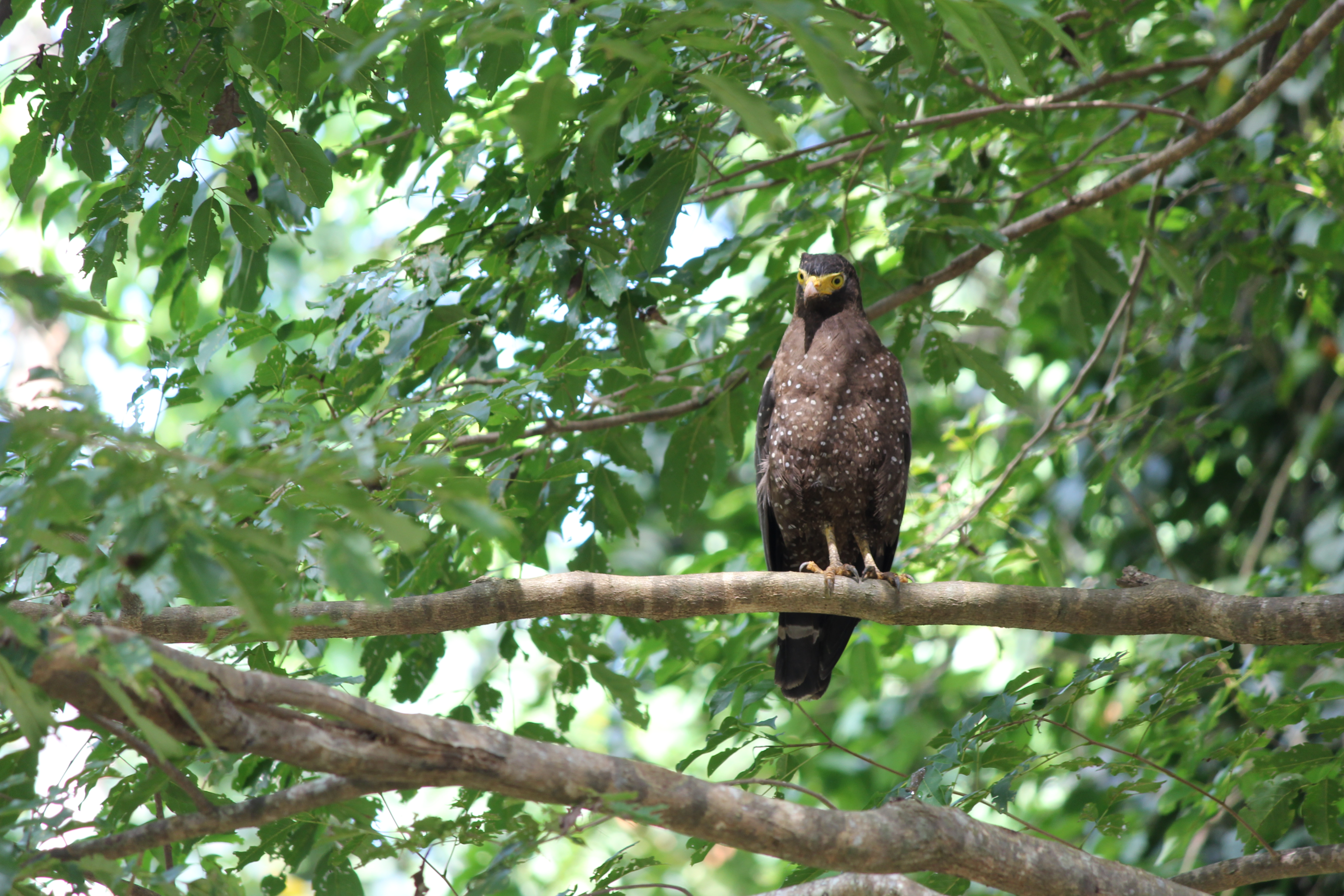
Andaman serpent eagle

=== Andaman serpent eagle (Spilornis elgini) ===
The Andaman serpent eagle, also the dark serpent eagle, is a close relative of the Great Nicobar serpent eagle and is distributed throughout the Andaman Islands. Little is known about this eagle's habits. It inhabits interior forests and lightly forested areas near cliffsides. Its IUCN status is Vulnerable and its population is decreasing with 3000-4000 mature individuals. It is threatened by agriculture, hunting, and tourism.

=== Nicobar sparrowhawk (Tachyspiza butleri) ===
The Nicobar sparrowhawk is a accipitrine hawk found in the Nicobar Islands. It is a poorly known species with two races (butleri, which is possibly extinct, in Car Nicobar and obsoleta in Kamorta and Katchal). It was previously considered part of a species group consisting of the shikra, Levant sparrowhawk, Chinese sparrowhawk and Frances's sparrowhawk. This species resides in canopies of tall trees. It has an IUCN status of Vulnerable with a population of 500-2500 mature individuals which is expected to be decreasing.

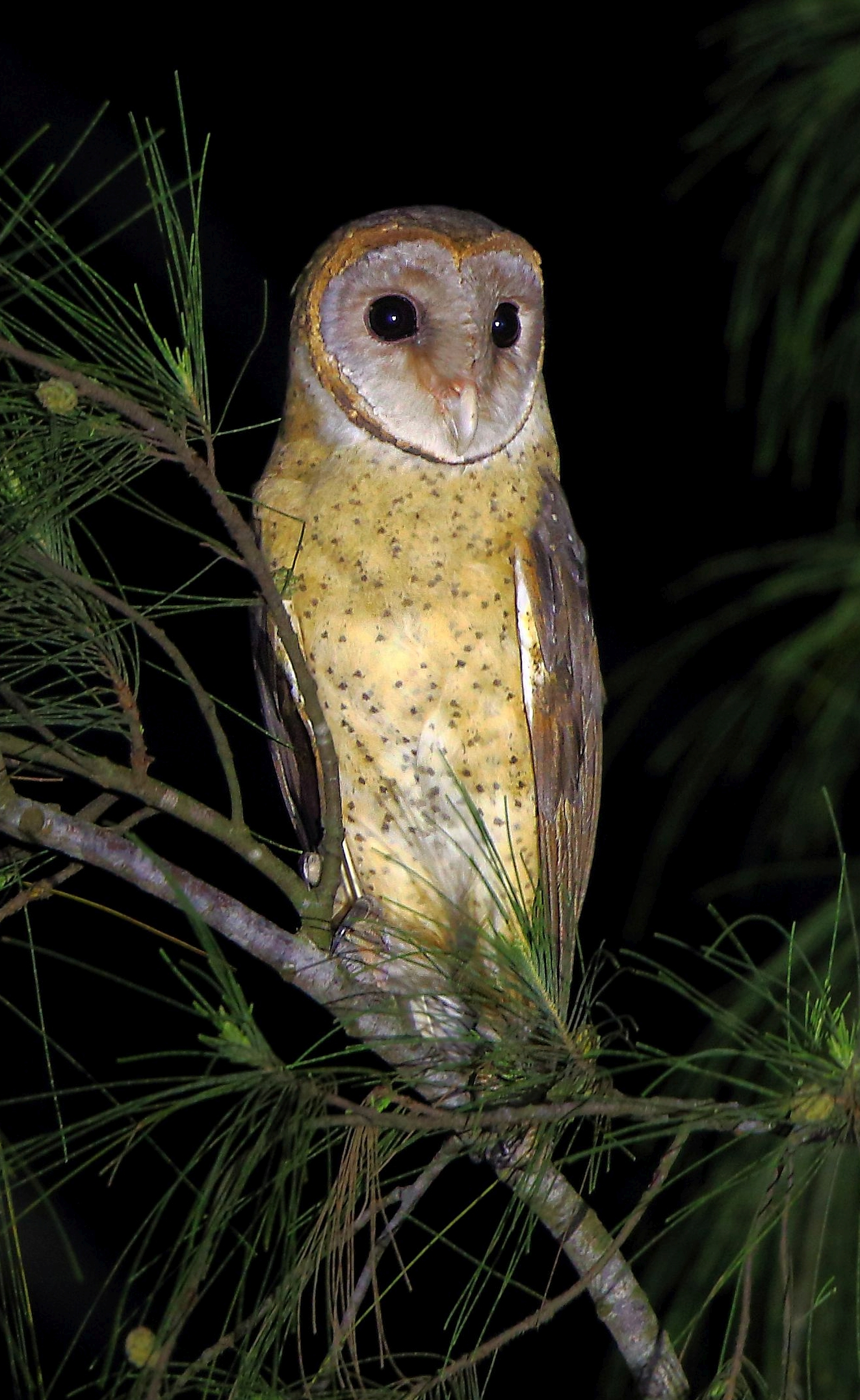
Andaman masked owl

=== Andaman masked owl (Tyto deroepstorffi) ===
The Andaman masked owl is a little-known species of barn owl. It is distributed throughout the Andamans. It was earlier considered a subspecies of the barn owl (now eastern barn owl). It has not been assessed by the IUCN. As it was earlier considered a part of the barn owl, not much is known about its potential threats.

=== Hume's boobook (Ninox obscura) ===
The Hume's boobook is a medium-sized owl native to the Andamans. It was until recently considered conspecific with the brown boobook. It has a IUCN status of Least Concern. Its population is presumed to be stable.

=== Andaman boobook (Ninox affinis) ===
The Andaman boobook is a little-known and little-sighted species of owl which is distributed throughout the Andamans. It is found throughout primary and secondary forest. It is not threatened but is expected to be undergoing a slow decline due to habitat loss.

=== Andaman scops owl (Otus balli) ===
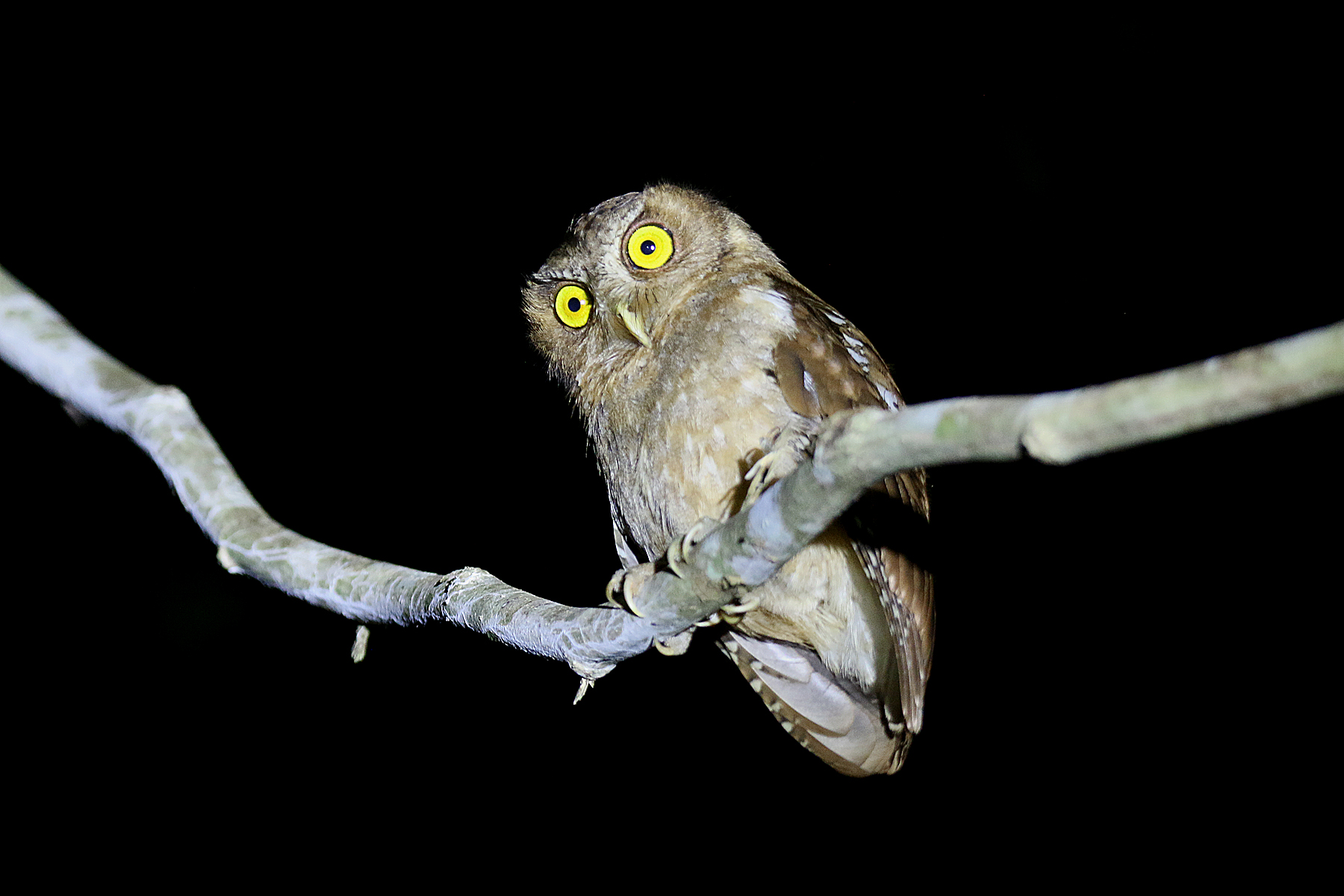
Andaman scops owl

The Andaman scops owl is another little-known species of scops owl found in the Andamans. It was previously considered conspecific with the African scops owl, but it is considered different due to differences in plumage and call. It is found in semi open areas and settlements, and has been known to enter bungalows. It is not globally threatened.

=== Nicobar scops owl (Otus alius) ===
The Nicobar scops owl is a little-known species native to Great Nicobar Island. It is known from only two specimens. It is listed as Near-threatened by the IUCN with a population form 2,500 to 10,000 mature individuals.

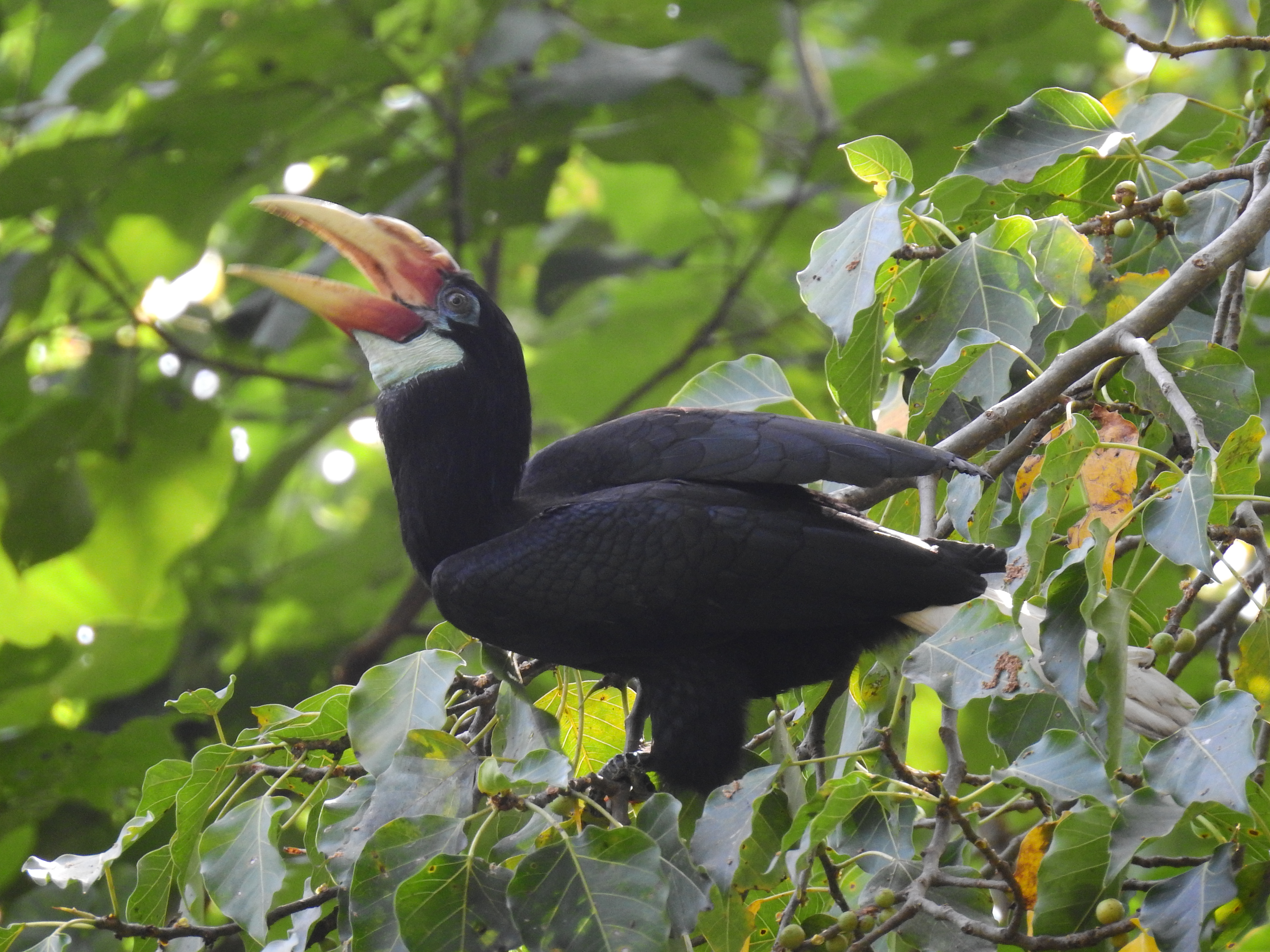
Narcondam hornbill

=== Narcondam hornbill (Rhyticeros narcondami) ===
The Narcondam hornbill is a species of hornbill which is endemic to Narcondam Island in the Andaman Islands. It is the only hornbill found the two island groups. It occupies habitats across the island. The bird is threatened, with an IUCN status of Vulnerable, and it has a decreasing population of 300-650 mature individuals. Its main threats are deforestation, hunting and the introduction of feral goats onto the island, which slow down the regeneration of the hornbill's food plants.

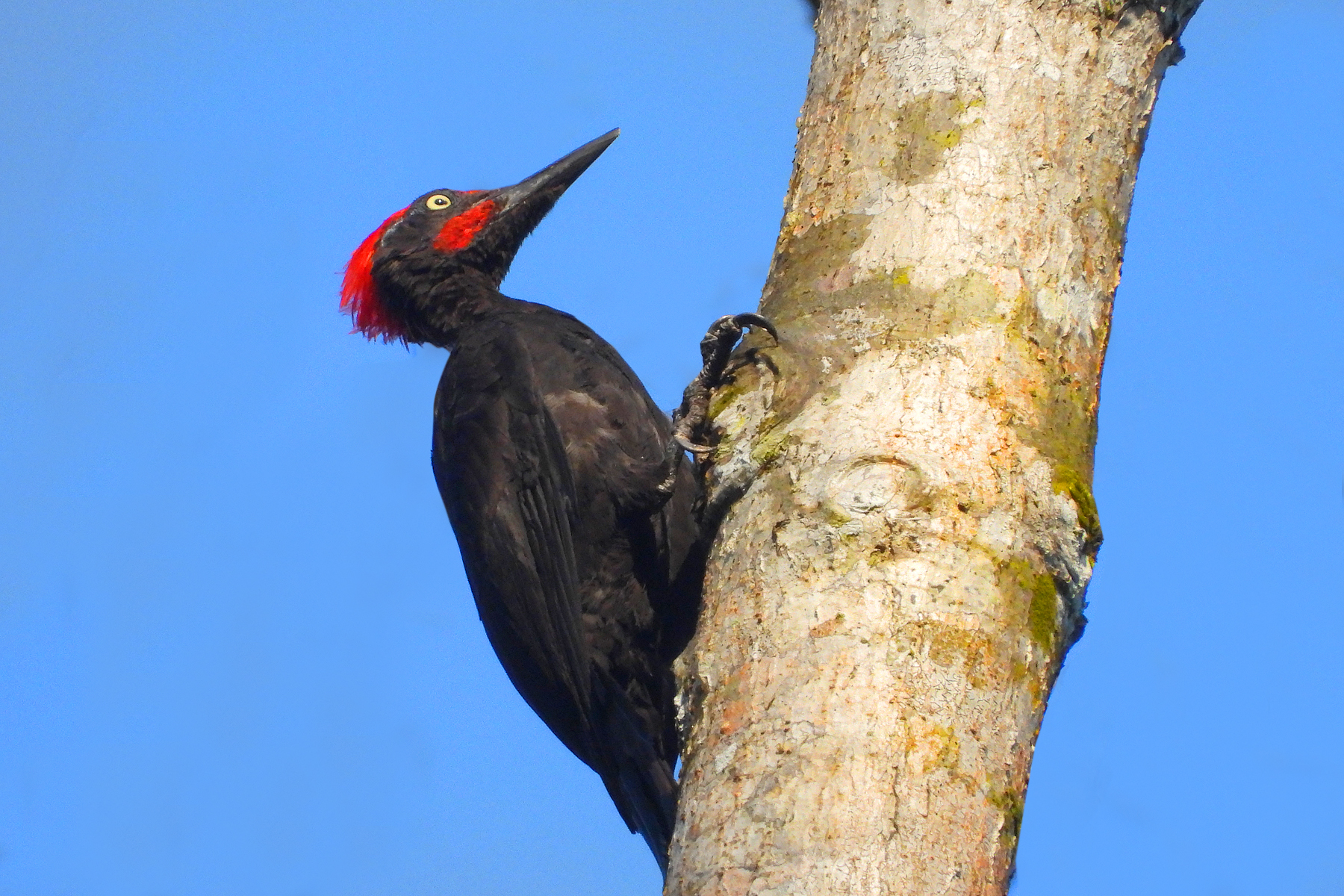
Male Andaman woodpecker

=== Andaman woodpecker (Dryocopus hodgei) ===
The Andaman woodpecker is a species of woodpecker distributed and endemic to the Andaman Islands. It is a little-known species, with very little being known about its behaviour. It occupies dense, slightly open evergreen forests. It has an IUCN status of Vulnerable, with a population of 1000-2500 that is expected to be decreasing due to logging and deforestation.

=== Nicobar parakeet (Psittacula caniceps) ===
The Nicobar parakeet is one of the largest parakeets measuring up to 60cm, it is native to the south and central portions of the Nicobars. It feeds on the fruits of Pandanus. It is listed as Near-threatened by the IUCN because of its presence in cagebird trade.

=== Nicobar hooded pitta (Pitta abbotti) ===
The Nicobar hooded pitta was recently split from the western hooded pitta, hence very little is known about it. It inhabits the interior of lowland and hill rainforest. It has not been assessed by the IUCN, and it is expected to have been subjected to moderated habitat loss.

=== Andaman cuckooshrike (Coracina dobsoni) ===
The Andaman cuckooshrike was formerly considered a subspecies of the bar-bellied cuckooshrike but is now recognized as a separate species. It lives in the forested habitats of the Andaman Islands. It is listed as Near-threatened by the IUCN, with a decreasing population of 2,500 to 10,000. It is threatened by rapid urbanization.

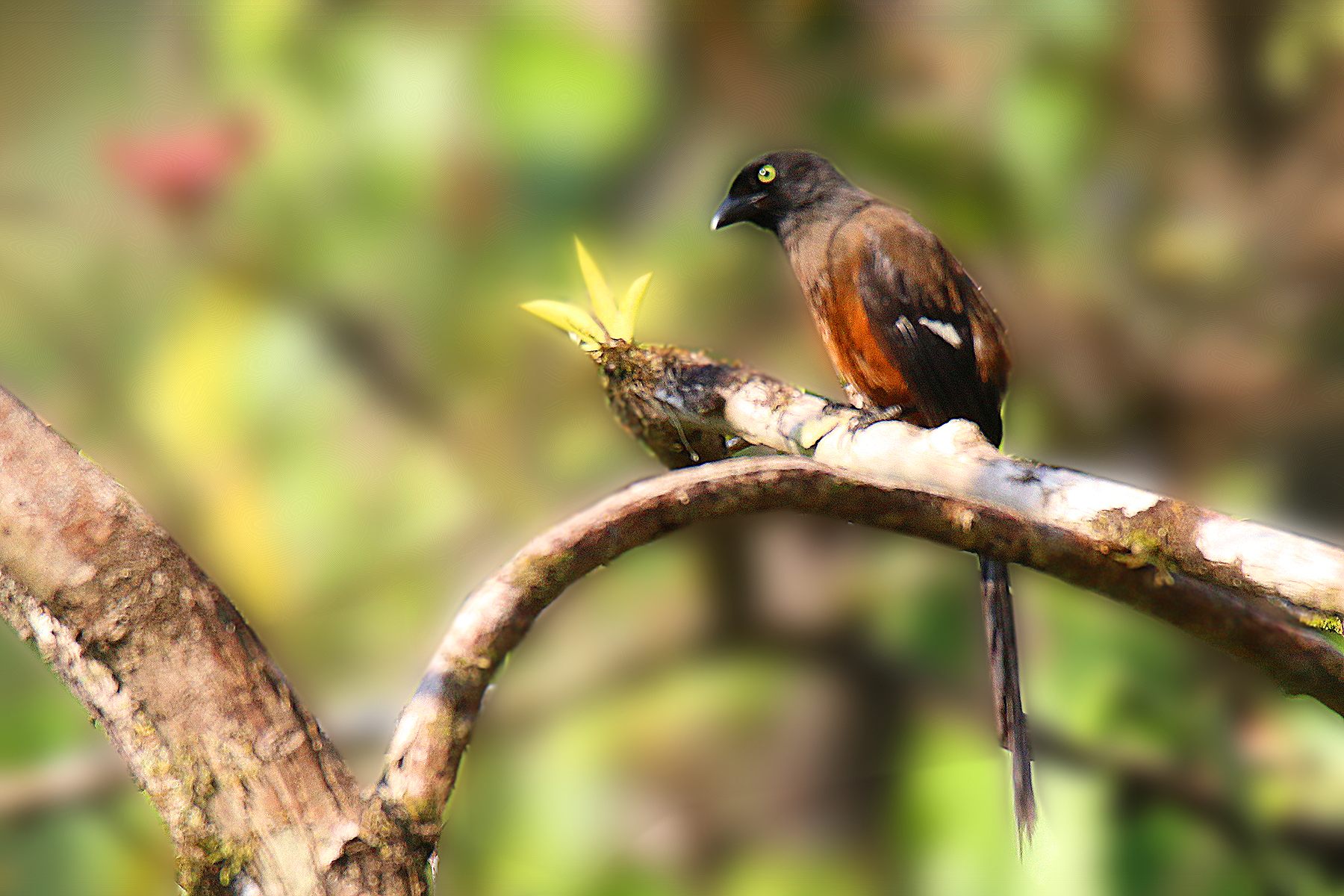
Andaman treepie

=== Andaman treepie (Dendrocitta bayleii) ===
The Andaman treepie is a species of treepie that is native to the Andaman Islands. It favors dense, evergreen forests, usually in the company of the Andaman drongo. It is listed as Vulnerable by the IUCN, with a population of 250 to 1,000 that is expected to be decreasing.

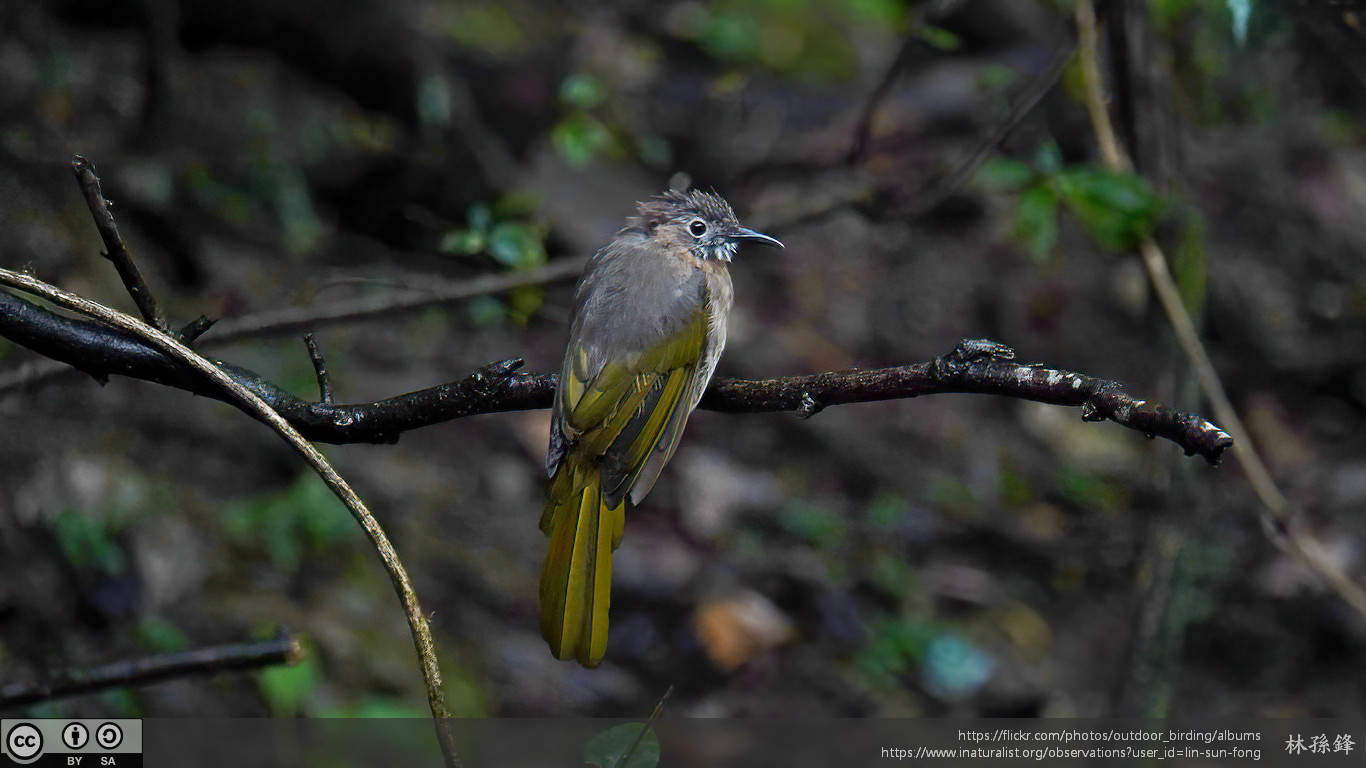
Nicobar bulbul

=== Nicobar bulbul (Hypsietes nicobariensis) ===
The Nicobar bulbul is a species of bulbul which is endemic to seven islands in the Nicobars, namely Kamorta Island, Trinket Island, Nancowry Island, Katchal Island, Teressa Island, Bompuka Island, and Tillangchong Island, with historical records on Chowra Island. This species prefers forests habitats but also occupies secondary forest. It is listed as Neart-threatened by the IUCN, with an estimated population of 3,500 to 20,000.

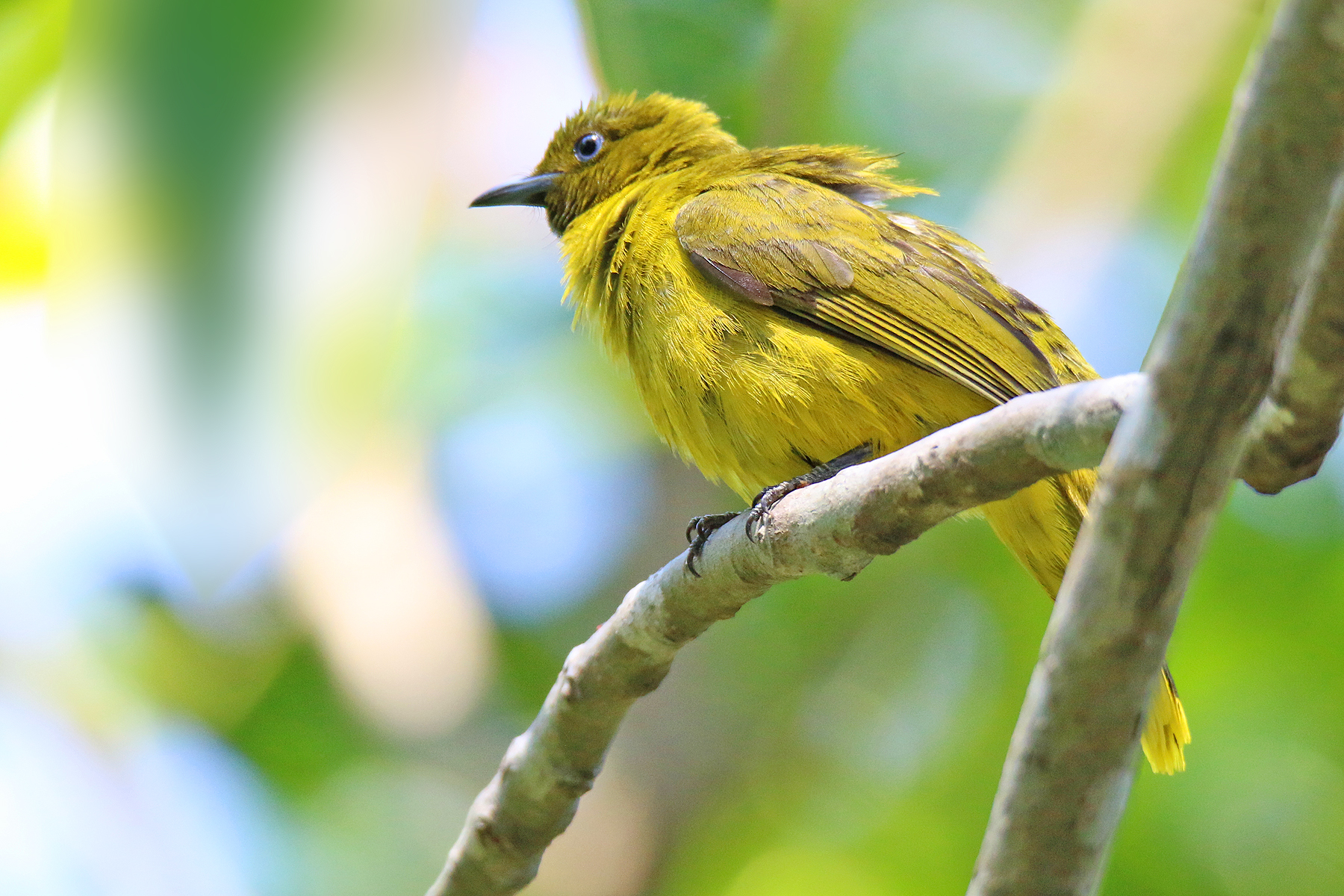
Andaman bulbul

=== Andaman bulbul (Brachypodius fuscoflavescens) ===
The Andaman bulbul is a species of bulbul native to the Andamans. It was considered a subspecies of the black-headed bulbul until 2008. It is found in evergreen and light deciduous forests. Despite its limited range, it is listed as Least Concern by the IUCN with an estimated population of 8,000. It is threatened by introduced species such as deer.

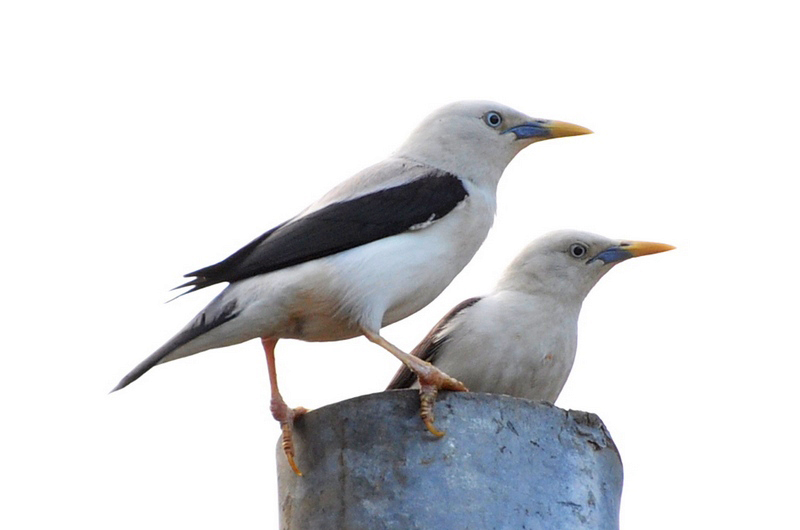
White-headed starling

=== White-headed starling (Sturnia erythropygia) ===
The white-headed starling is a species of starling found in the Andaman and Nicobar Islands. It is most widely distributed in the Andamans. Car Nicobar and Katchal Island are the only places where it is found in the Nicobars. It is found in woodlands and forest edges. It is listed as Least Concern by the IUCN.

=== Andaman shama (Copsychus albiventris) ===
The Andaman shama is a species of Old World flycatcher native to the Andamans. Like other members of its genus, it inhabits dense forest. It is listed as Least Concern by the IUCN.

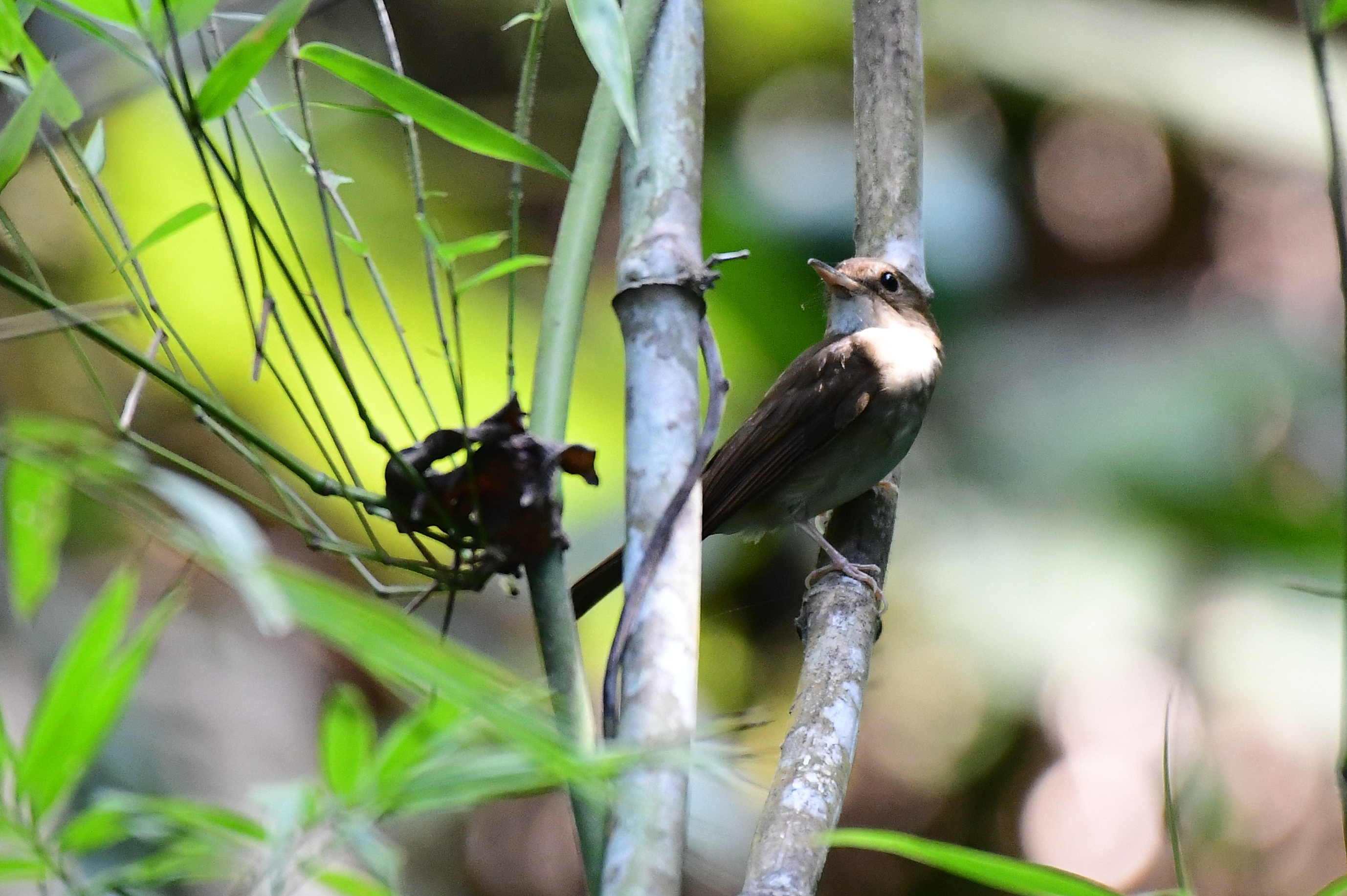
Nicobar jungle flycatcher

=== Nicobar jungle flycatcher (Cyornis nicobaricus) ===
The Nicobar jungle flycatcher is a species of Old World flycatcher native to the Nicobars. It was previously considered a subspecies of the brown-chested jungle flycatcher but differs from it by having a narrower bill. It is listed as Near threatened by the IUCN, with a population of 2,200 to 20,000.

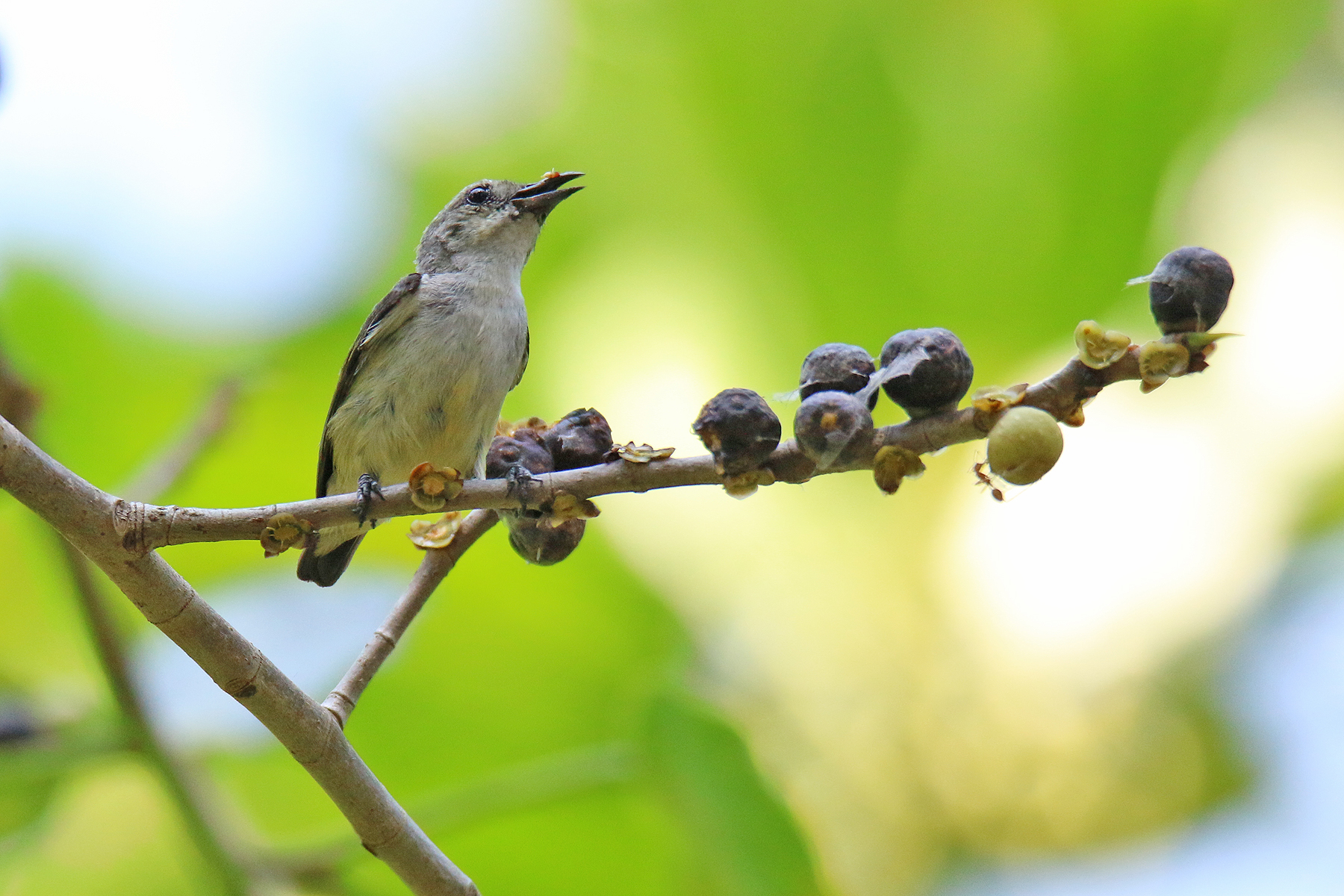
Andaman flowerpecker

=== Andaman flowerpecker (Dicaeum virescens) ===
The Andaman flowerpecker is a little-known flowerpecker that is native to and found abundantly on the Andamans. It and the Nilgiri flowerpecker were considered part of the plain flowerpecker but was split due to slight differences in plumage and voice. It is found in slightly wooded areas. Due to its recent split from the plain flowerpecker, this species has not been assessed by the IUCN but is not expected to be threatened.

== See also ==
- Wildlife of India
- Flora of India
- Fauna of India
- List of trees of the Andaman Islands
- List of birds of the Andaman and Nicobar Islands
- List of reptiles and amphibians of the Andaman and Nicobar Islands
- List of butterflies of the Andaman and Nicobar Islands
- Bird sanctuaries of India
