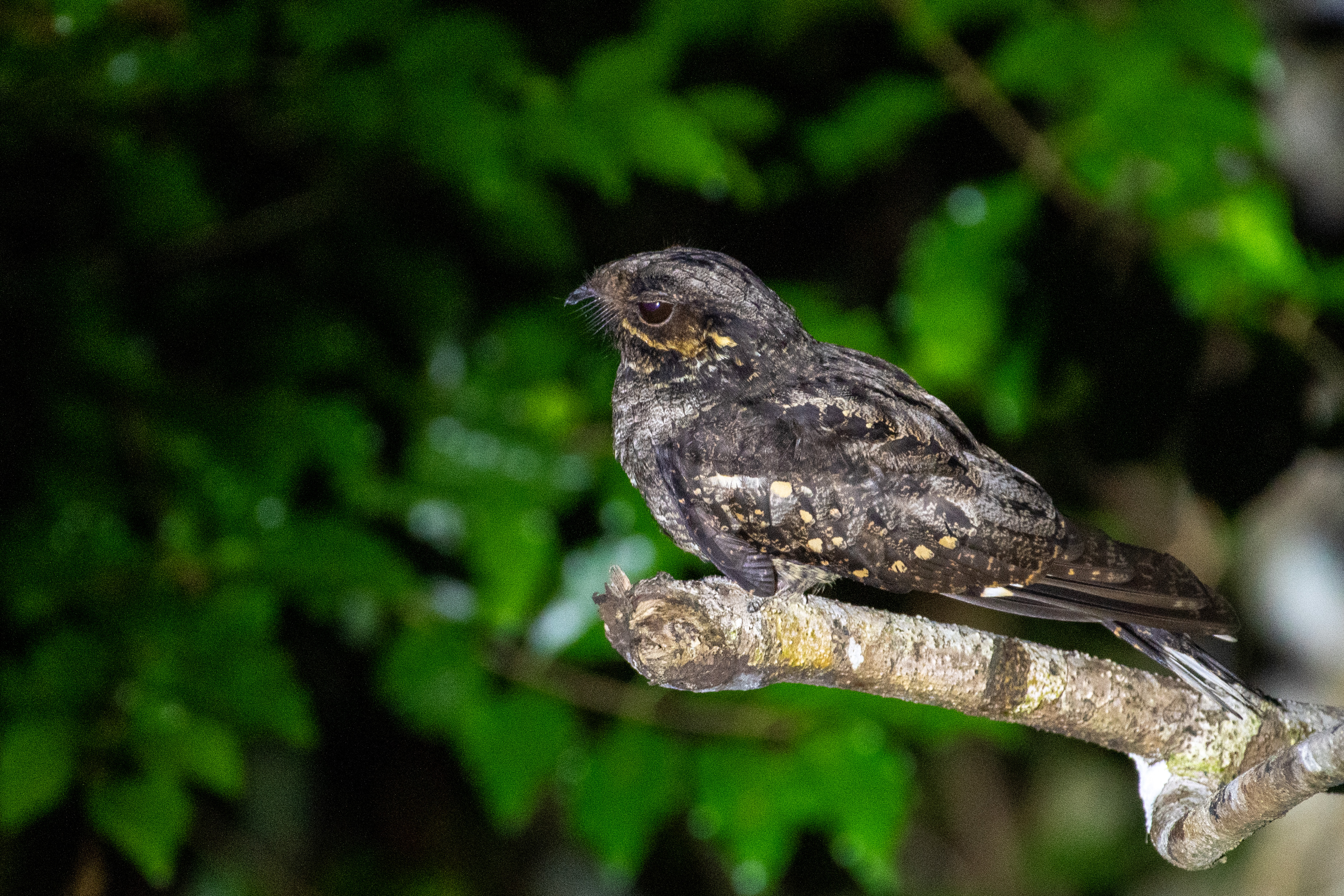

Conservation status
- Least Concern (IUCN 3.1)

Scientific classification
- Kingdom: Animalia
- Phylum: Chordata
- Class: Aves
- Order: Caprimulgiformes
- Family: Caprimulgidae
- Genus: Caprimulgus
- Species: C. andamanicus

Binomial name
- Caprimulgus andamanicus Hume, 1873

= Andaman nightjar =

Species of bird

The Andaman nightjar (Caprimulgus andamanicus) is a species of nightjar found in the Andaman Islands. It is sometimes considered a subspecies of the large-tailed nightjar, however the song and morphology are distinct.

The species is found in most of the islands in the Andamans and calls suggest it may be possible in the Narcondam Island as well. It is said to be common in teak forest and open country with scattered trees. The call is a tyuk lacking the following tremolo that is heard in the large-tailed nightjar and more rapidly repeated.
