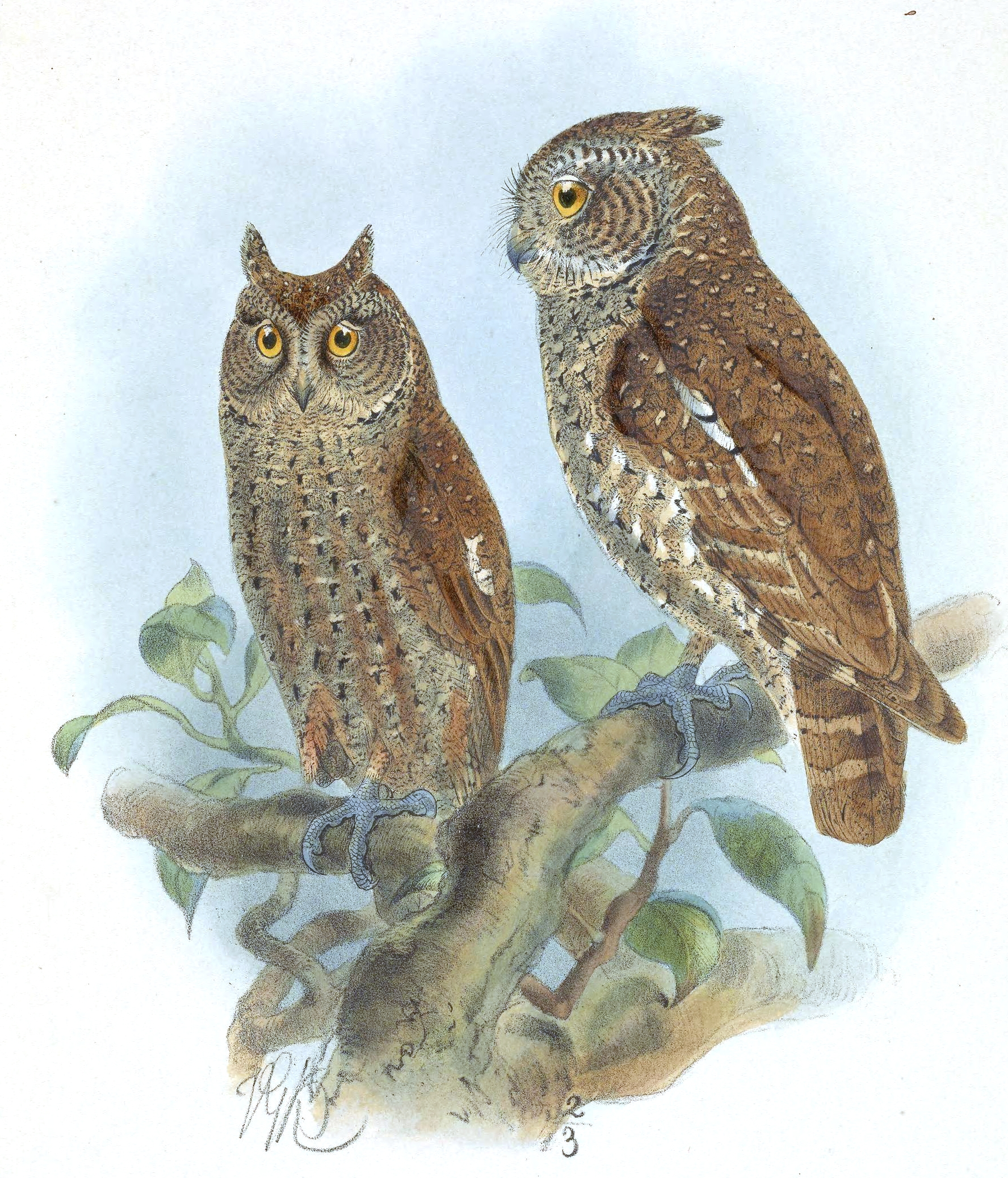

Conservation status
- Least Concern (IUCN 3.1)
- CITES Appendix II

Scientific classification
- Kingdom: Animalia
- Phylum: Chordata
- Class: Aves
- Order: Strigiformes
- Family: Strigidae
- Genus: Otus
- Species: O. balli

Binomial name
- Otus balli (Hume, 1873)

= Andaman scops owl =

Species of owl

The Andaman scops owl (Otus balli) is a species of the Strigidae family and is native to the Andaman Islands of India. It is a largely brown owl with white speckles and yellow eyes. The owl was first described in 1873 by British ornithologist Allan Octavian Hume. The Andaman scops owl has no sightings outside of the Andaman Islands, therefore research on this bird is limited. This owl is not threatened, though an increase in deforestation on the islands has led to the population size slowly declining. It is a nocturnal owl that feeds at night and has a nesting season from February to April.

== Field identification ==
The Andaman scops owl is between 18 and 19 cm in height. They occur in red-brown and grey-brown morphs. The species is also noted for its prominent ear tufts and pale eyebrows. The upperparts of the owl are spotted with black and white spots. In addition, white spots can be seen along the neck and crown area. In contrast to the upperparts, the underparts are pale and grey. The tail will be brown and tan while the feathers will appear brown, tan, and white. The owl notably also can have bright yellow irises that could also occur in brown or hazel. Similarly, the bill is yellow, and the feet will be greenish-yellow or grey.

== Systematics history ==
The Andaman scops owl was considered the same species as O. icterorhynchus due to their similar morphologies. However, differences in their vocals and feathers have led to ornithologists identifying them as separate species.

== Sound ==
The owl makes a loud pulsating "hoot, hoot" noise that switches between high and low pitch. They also make a sound like "curroo" where they resemble a human rolling their "r."

== Diet and foraging ==
This is a nocturnal animal that hunts at night. It eats a variety of insects like caterpillars and beetles. When hunting, it hides in the leaves and silently slides behind the prey before it attacks.

== Habitat ==
The species prefers living in trees in semi-open areas. This includes gardens, cultivated areas, and next to human settlements. The species is also notorious for entering bungalows and homes.

== Conservation status ==
Conservation status of this owl was listed as "Least Concern" by the IUCN Red List of Threatened Species in 2020. A rise of habitat destruction on the Islands has caused some worries about the future of the owl, but as of the last assessment date, the population numbers are healthy. Though there is no official population size recorded, the owl has tolerated habitat destruction well.

== Breeding ==
The Andaman scops owl typically lays its eggs between February and April. They will nest in a tree hollow, or an abandoned woodpecker or barbet hole. The eggs are laid above ground about 2-4 meters high. Only 2-3 eggs are laid at a time. The owl has a generation length of about 3.7 years.

== Gallery ==
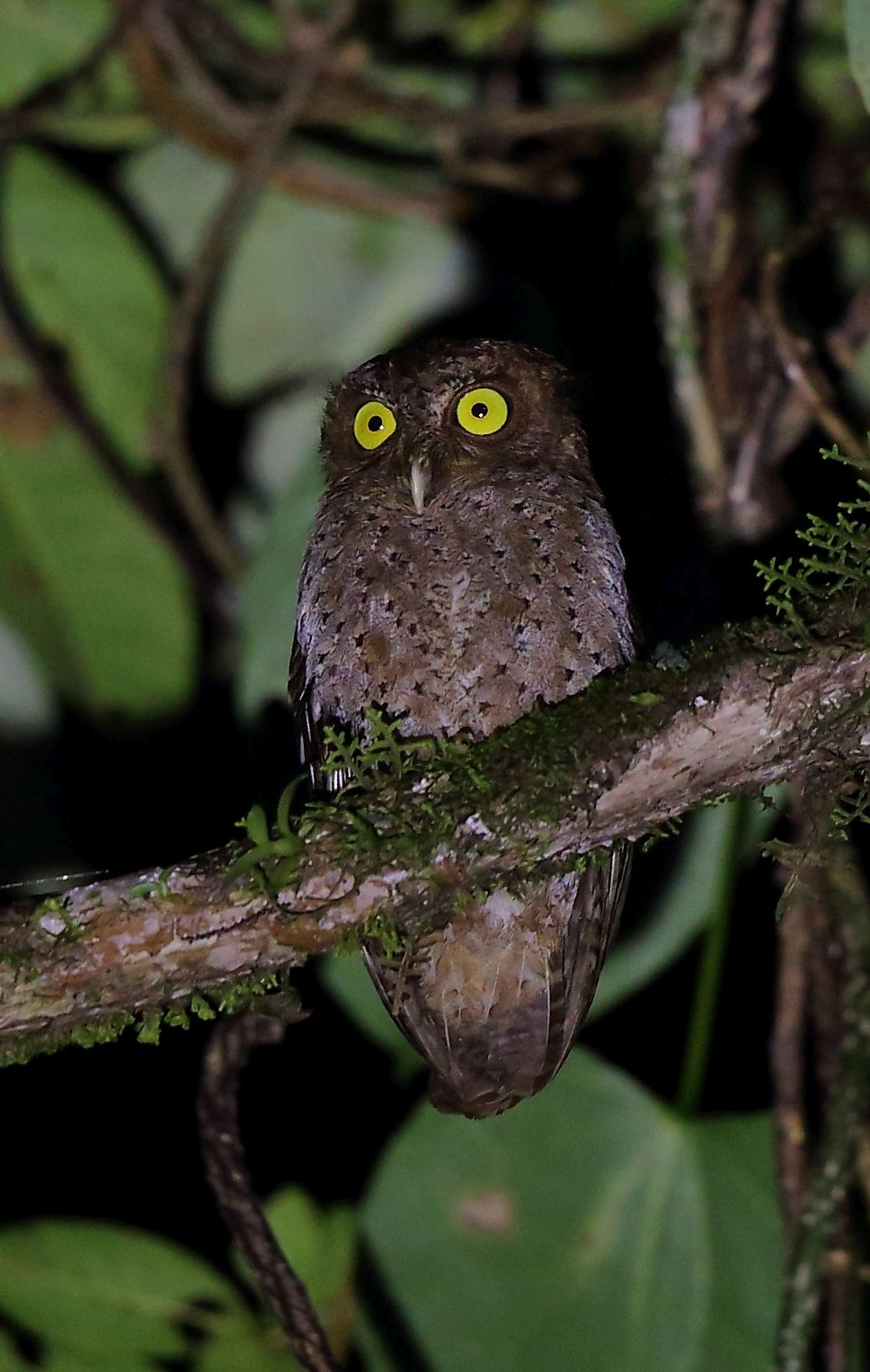

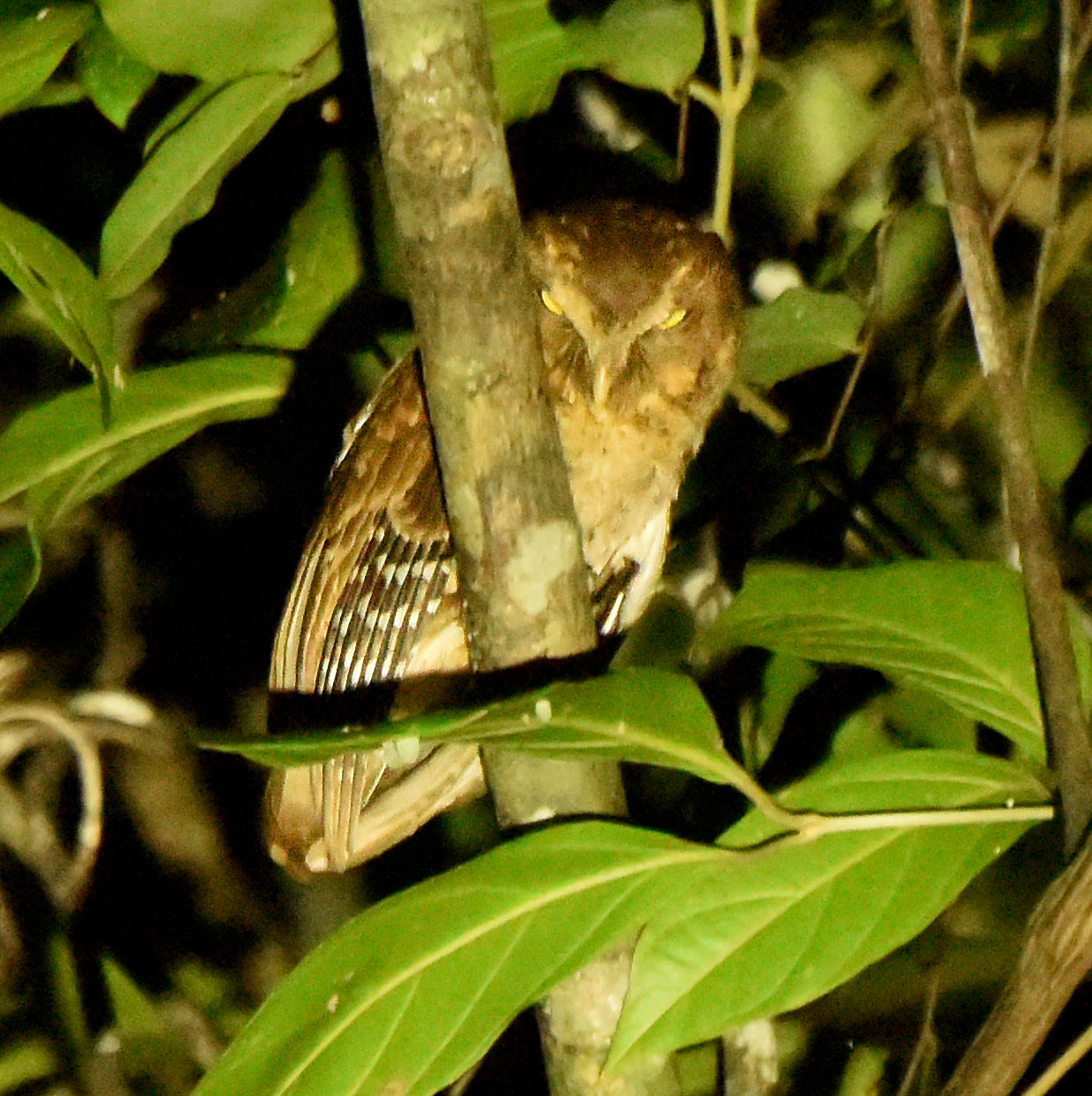
