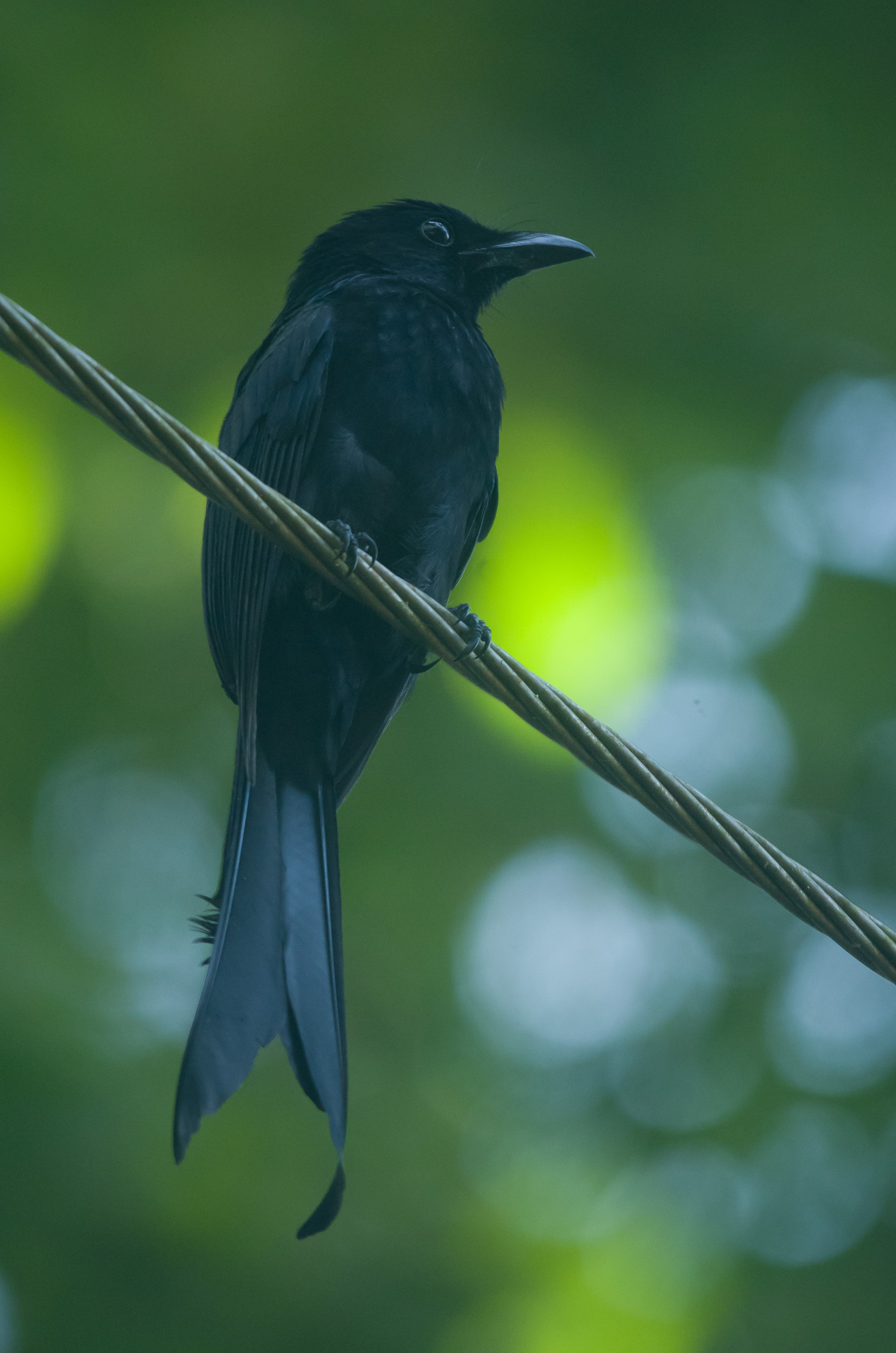
- Nominate race Havelock Island

Conservation status
- Least Concern (IUCN 3.1)

Scientific classification
- Kingdom: Animalia
- Phylum: Chordata
- Class: Aves
- Order: Passeriformes
- Family: Dicruridae
- Genus: Dicrurus
- Species: D. andamanensis

Binomial name
- Dicrurus andamanensis Beavan, 1867

= Andaman drongo =

Species of bird

The Andaman Drongo (Dicrurus andamanensis) is a species of bird in the family Dicruridae. The species is endemic to the Andaman Islands of the Indian Ocean. There are two subspecies, the nominate race being found across the main islands of the archipelago, and the race dicruriformis occurring on Great Coco Island and Table Island in the north of the chain.

Its natural habitats are subtropical or tropical moist lowland forest and subtropical or tropical moist montane forest. It is threatened by habitat loss.

== Subspecies and distribution ==
The Andaman drongo is endemic to the Andaman Islands, situated in the Bay of Bengal. Formerly classified as a subspecies of the black drongo (Dicrurus macrocercus), recent genetic research has firmly established it as a distinct species. DNA analysis by Dr. S. Krishnan in 2015, as published in the 'Avian Biology Research' journal, confirmed this reclassification.

== Description ==
The Andaman drongo is 28-29 cm long, although the larger dicruriformis subspecies is 35 cm in length. These birds possess 2-centimeter-long hairy filaments and feathers on each side of the neck. In terms of coloration, the males have black plumage, with the exception of brownish primaries and a black abdomen, flanks, and undertail-coverts. Their entire plumage has green sheen, and their wing-linings have a silvery brown hue with white-tipped axillaries and underwing-coverts.

The females have a less pronounced forked tail and are smaller in size compared to the males. Juveniles, in their early stages, display a more square-ended tail, a browner and less glossy appearance than the adults, and a lack of the distinctive frontal filaments. Additionally, they exhibit more prominent white tips on their axillaries and underwing coverts.

== Habitat ==
The Andaman drongo species found exclusively in the lush tropical forests of the Andaman Islands in the Bay of Bengal. The primary habitat of the Andaman drongo consists of evergreen and semi-evergreen forests that are characterized by canopy trees, a diverse understory, lianas and epiphytic plants. Within these forest habitats, the Andaman drongo primarily occupies the mid to upper canopy levels, where it is known for its acrobatic aerial foraging.

== Diet ==
Its diet mainly consists of insects, like dragonflies, butterflies, and beetles, as well as spiders and other small arthropods.

== Sounds ==
The Andaman drongo exhibits complex vocalizations and song patterns that distinguish it from its close relatives. Ongoing research by Dr. A. Patel and Dr. R. Rajan, as documented in the 'Ornithology Journal,' has unveiled the sophistication of the Andaman drongo's vocal communication, revealing its role in territorial defense and intricate social interactions.

== Conservation ==
According to the 2020 report from the Andaman Forest Department, only 10% of the original forest cover remains, emphasizing the urgent need for habitat preservation. Invasive species, particularly the common myna (Acridotheres tristis), have further threatened the Andaman drongo's breeding success, outcompeting them for nesting sites and food resources. They are now classified as a near threatened species. Organizations such as the Andaman Avian Society have partnered with the Andaman Forest Department to establish protected areas and corridors for the species.
