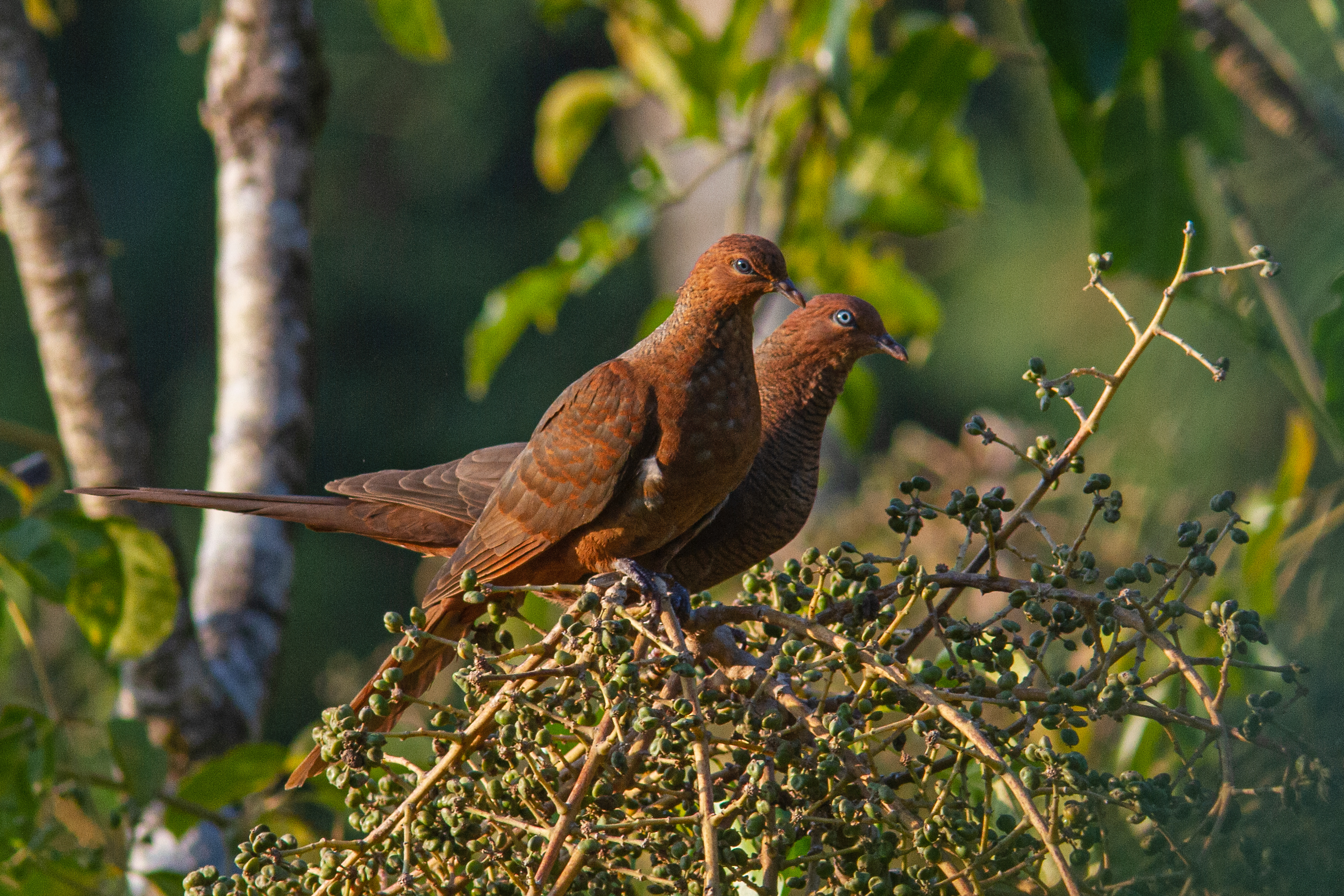
- Andaman cuckoo-dove female and male from Mount Harriet National Park, Andaman and Nicobar Islands, India
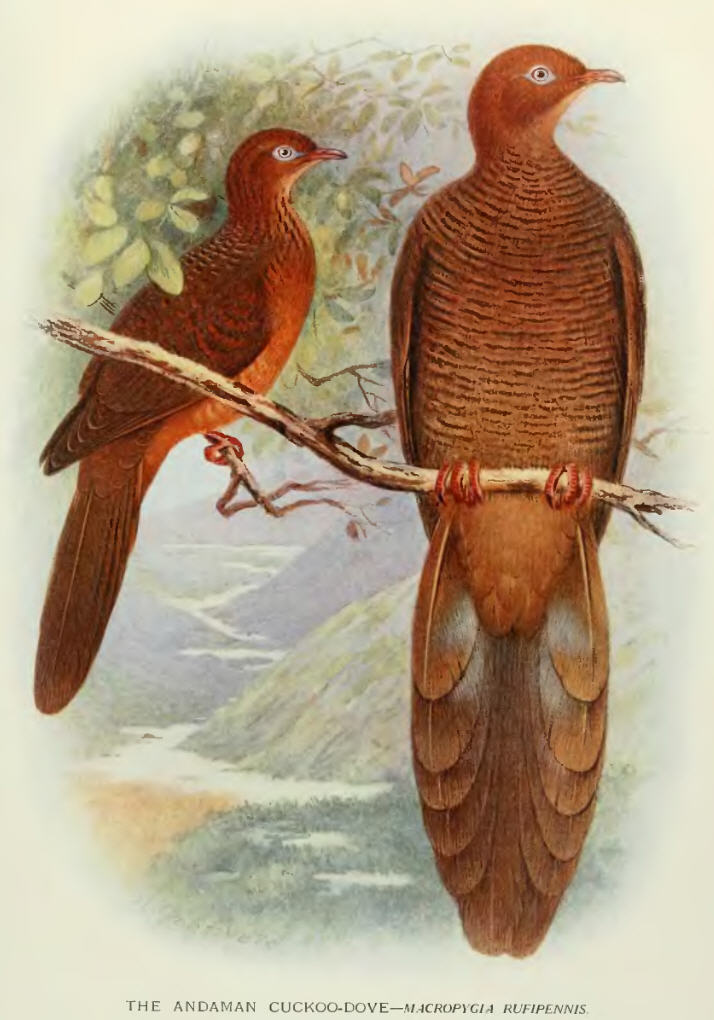

Conservation status
- Least Concern (IUCN 3.1)

Scientific classification
- Kingdom: Animalia
- Phylum: Chordata
- Class: Aves
- Order: Columbiformes
- Family: Columbidae
- Genus: Macropygia
- Species: M. rufipennis

Binomial name
- Macropygia rufipennis Blyth, 1846

= Andaman cuckoo-dove =

Species of bird

The Andaman cuckoo-dove (Macropygia rufipennis) is a species of bird in the family Columbidae. It is endemic to the Andaman and Nicobar Islands. It is characterized by its small body and rusty color. Its call is a repeated cooing "koo". Due to habitat loss and hunting, the species is becoming rare, yet it is listed as Least Concern. The Department of Environment and Forests, Andaman and Nicobar Islands, and the Zoological Survey of India are monitoring, surveying, and bringing awareness to the species' population. The species is frequently discovered in or around forest areas, with a diet that consists of mostly fruits and berries. The Andaman cuckoo-dove's breeding season is believed to be from February to April, but little information is known about this species.

== Description ==
It is characterized by its slim build, small head, long tail, and rust color throughout its body. The call of the Andaman cuckoo-dove is a repeat of the double-noted "whoo-whup." The first note is slurred and the second is shorter and more pitched.

== Conservation and status ==
The Andaman cuckoo-dove has a large range, which exempts it from being classified as vulnerable under the International Union for Conservation of Nature (IUCN) criteria. Its species is still suspected of having a decreasing population trend due to habitat degradation and hunting. The decline is still not considered a rapid enough change to meet the criteria for vulnerable status—less than a 30% decline over ten years or three generations. The population of this species has not been accurately measured, yet the decrease is not deemed significant enough to justify vulnerable status. Consequently, the species is currently categorized as Least Concern.

Efforts to protect the threatened bird species have been initiated by the Department of Environment and Forests, Andaman and Nicobar Islands, and the Zoological Survey of India as they are all currently monitoring the bird population. The departments proposed conducting surveys to assess population size and studied both habitat and ecological parameters. The department's goal is to take measurements of how much the forest is degrading, identify the species population decline, and ban hunting by spreading awareness with campaigns.

== Habitat ==
The Andaman Cuckoo-Dove lives in heavy evergreen and secondary forests. They are commonly found yet hidden in forests, along forest edges, and typically remain closer to the canopy. They have a high forest dependence and normally occur at altitudes that range from 0 to 100 meters. These species are endemic to India and distributed in the Andaman and Nicobar Islands. The Important Bird and Biodiversity Areas (IBA) of these cuckoo-dove species are Nicobar, Nancowry and Trinkat.

== Ecology ==
=== Diet ===
The primary food source for the species is predominantly fruits and berries, particularly sourced from Vitis spp and Leae spp.

=== Breeding ===
The breeding season occurs from February to April. Males with enlarged testes had been collected in February, March, and April. The nesting sites, nests, and eggs are not previously known to science. This species has very little recent information on its status, but they are reported to be not uncommon. This is because there has not been a rapid enough decline since 2017, so they do not meet the criteria to be considered globally threatened but are still in danger. The restricted-range species are present in the Andaman Islands EBA.
