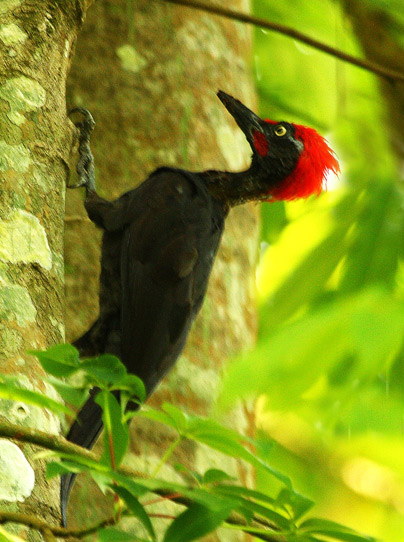
- Male

Conservation status
- Vulnerable (IUCN 3.1)

Scientific classification
- Kingdom: Animalia
- Phylum: Chordata
- Class: Aves
- Order: Piciformes
- Family: Picidae
- Genus: Dryocopus
- Species: D. hodgei

Binomial name
- Dryocopus hodgei (Blyth, 1860)

= Andaman woodpecker =

Species of bird

The Andaman woodpecker (Dryocopus hodgei) is a species of bird in the woodpecker family Picidae. It is endemic to the Andaman Islands in India. Its natural habitat is tropical moist lowland forests. It is threatened by habitat loss.

== Taxonomy ==
The Andaman woodpecker was described by Edward Blyth in 1860 as Mulleripicus Hodgei. The specific name hodgei is for Captain S. Hodge, of the Royal Navy, who was stationed in the Andaman Islands at the time. The species was once considered to be a subspecies of the white-bellied woodpecker, but differs in its appearance and its calls. The separation of the two species is also supported by genetic evidence.

== Description ==
The Andaman woodpecker is around 38 cm (15 in) long and weighs between 156–255 g (5.5–9.0 oz). The plumage is mostly slate-grey to black, with a bright red crest. The male also has a red crown and malar area under the eye. The bare skin around the eye is grey, and the legs are slaty coloured, and the bill is black. The irises are pale yellow. Juvenile birds look like adults but have browner, duller plumage and brown eyes, and may have with feathers in the crown. The species differs from the white-bellied woodpecker in not having a white belly and having more slate-coloured plumage (as opposed to black).

== Behaviour ==
Little is recorded about the behaviour of the Andaman woodpecker. It lives in pairs, but also associates in small flocks. It forages on large trunks and branches, but has also been recorded foraging on the ground for ants. It has been recorded breeding between January and March, and breeds in a nest hole 6–14 m (20–46 ft) off the forest floor, in a dead tree. Two eggs are laid.

== Habitat and threats ==
The Andaman woodpecker is endemic to the Andaman Islands, where it is found in the rain forests of the lowlands. The species is threatened by the loss of habitat, as the human population of the Andaman Islands increases and clears forests for agriculture. Because of this threat, the International Union for Conservation of Nature (IUCN) has assessed it as being vulnerable to extinction.
