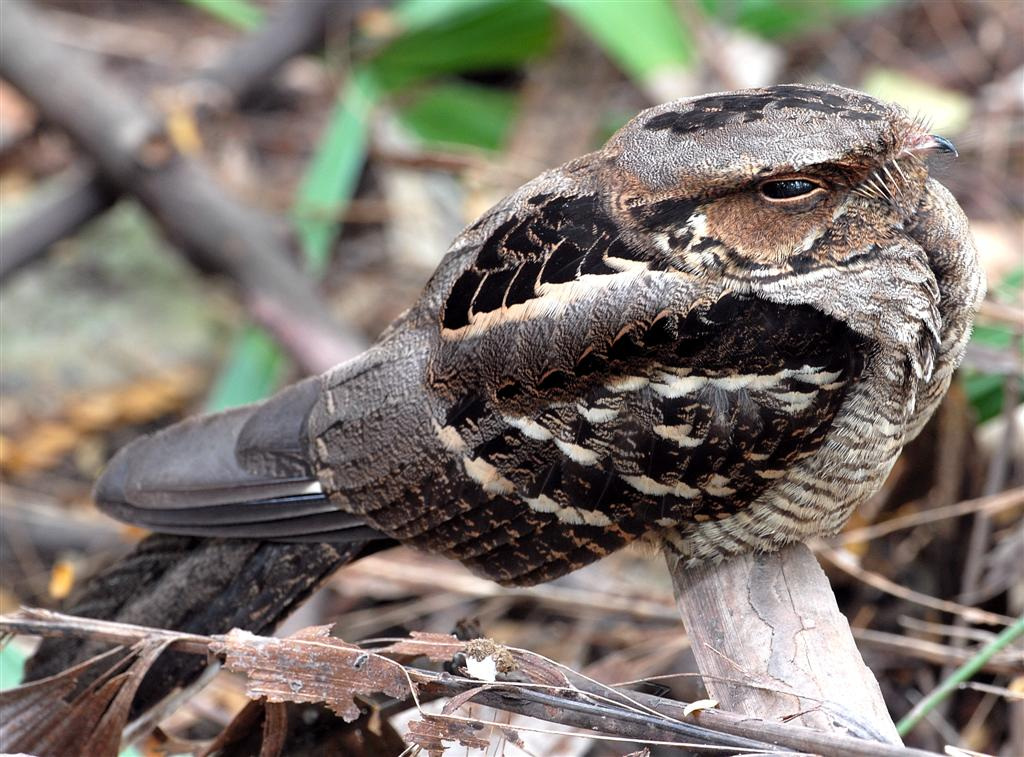

Conservation status
- Least Concern (IUCN 3.1)

Scientific classification
- Kingdom: Animalia
- Phylum: Chordata
- Class: Aves
- Order: Caprimulgiformes
- Family: Caprimulgidae
- Genus: Caprimulgus
- Species: C. macrurus

Binomial name
- Caprimulgus macrurus Horsfield, 1821

= Large-tailed nightjar =

Species of bird

The large-tailed nightjar (Caprimulgus macrurus) is a species of nightjar known for its distinctive long, broad tail and cryptic plumage that allows it to blend into its surroundings. Found along the southern Himalayan foothills, eastern South Asia, Southeast Asia and northern Australia, its natural habitats are subtropical or tropical moist lowland forest, subtropical or tropical mangrove forest, and subtropical or tropical moist montane forest.

== Description ==
The large-tailed nightjar measures approximately 31.5 to 33 cm in length. The cryptic plumage and colouration of large-tailed nightjars provide effective camouflage within its natural habitat.

Males exhibit distinctive markings, characterized by a pale crown with a dark median stripe. A prominent row of black scapular feathers, bordered by broad buff or whitish-buff fringes, enhances their striking appearance. Additionally, males possess a white throat patch and along, broad brown tail marked with uneven dark bars. Large white patches on its primaries and outer tail feathers can be observed in flight.

In contrast, females display a paler and greyer plumage compared to males. They have smaller buff-coloured wing patches and less vibrant tail patches, resulting in a drabber appearance.

== Taxonomy ==
The large-tailed nightjar (Caprimulgus macrurus) is a species of nightjar belonging to the family Caprimulgidae. There are 6 subspecies presently recognized (C.m. albonotatus, C.m. bimaculatus, C.m. macrurus, C.m. salvadorii, C.m. johnsoni, C.m. schlegelii). Originally a species complex of 12 different subspecies, differences in territorial vocalizations have been interpreted as evidence for reproductive isolation and, consequently, the delegation of some members of the complex as new species of nightjar under the biological species concept.

== Habitat and distribution ==
The large-tailed nightjar is found across a diverse range of habitats within subtropical and tropical zones. This species is a resident of the countries of Australia, Bangladesh, Bhutan, Brunei, Cambodia, China, India, Indonesia, Laos, Malaysia, Myanmar, Nepal, Pakistan, Papua New Guinea, Philippines, Singapore, Thailand, Timor-Leste and Vietnam. Its distribution spans a wide geographical area, extending from northern India through eastern China and Indonesia to northern Australia.

This species commonly inhabits secondary forests, forest edges, plantations, and wooded parks. It has also been observed in agricultural landscapes, where its presence may be of significant economic interest to farmers, as large-tailed nightjars are believed to play a role in the biological control of insect pests.

== Behaviour ==
The large-tailed nightjar's remarkable camouflage and nocturnal lifestyle pose significant challenges for studying their behaviour and ecology. Similar to other nightjar species, they depend primarily on acoustic communication rather than visual cues for inter-specific and intra-specific communication.

=== Vocalizations ===
Songs can be heard year-round, but vocal activity may vary depending on breeding activity, population density, and moon phase. The large-tailed nightjar has a distinctive, monotonous song that it uses to assert its territory. Territorial songs are typically given by males, but there are also reports of females giving these songs. Singing is most notable during courtship and early breeding, primarily taking place from perches or occasionally in pursuit-flights.

Long-tailed nightjars also perform grunting calls, which are very different from territorial songs. They are best described as a series of deep, low-pitched "wroww" calls or a series of fast-repeated "wrrrog" or "grrrog" notes.

=== Diet ===
Large-tailed nightjars are aerial insectivores. Their diets are primarily composed of beetles, moths, and other flying insects consumed while the bird is in flight. However, there have been a few observations of the large-tailed nightjar walking and pecking at the ground, apparently preying on terrestrial ants. It has been suggested that, while ground foraging is not common, it may occur more frequently than previously thought, as a response to low abundance of flying insects.

=== Reproduction ===
Little is known about the large-tailed nightjar's nesting and roosting behaviour. The breeding season most likely extends from mid-March to late September. The female does not build a nest and instead lays 1-2 eggs in a shallow depression of leaf litter on the ground. The eggs are pinkish-buff to pale yellow in colour and chicks have mealy brown feathers that ensure good camouflage in their nest site. Nightjar chicks emerge with downy feathers and may be moved from the nest site 1–2 days after hatching. Chicks move every night and siblings will sometimes separate, likely to avoid detection by predators.

== Gallery ==
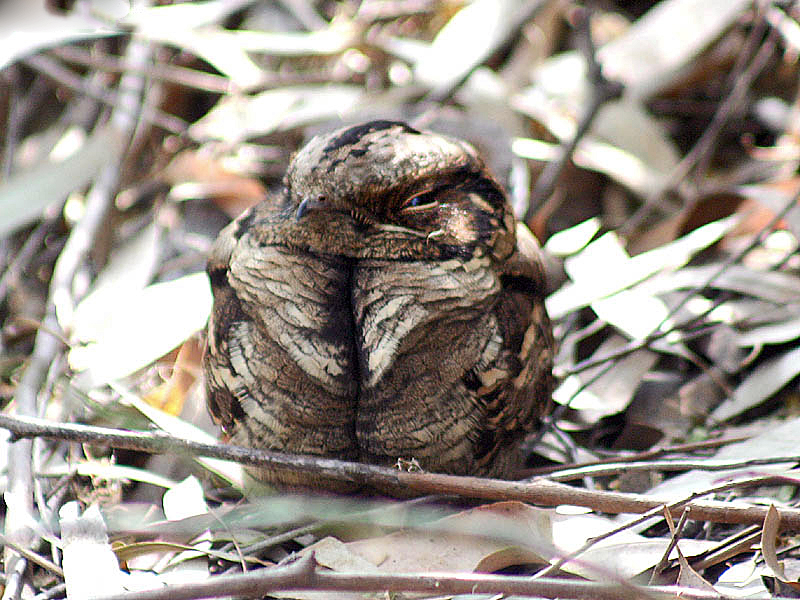
at Bharatpur, Rajasthan, India.

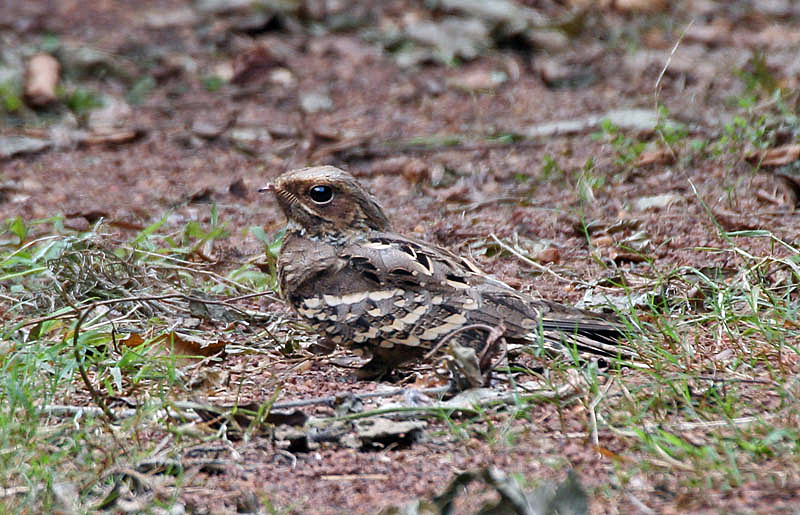
Female C. m. bimaculatus in Narendrapur near Kolkata, West Bengal, India.

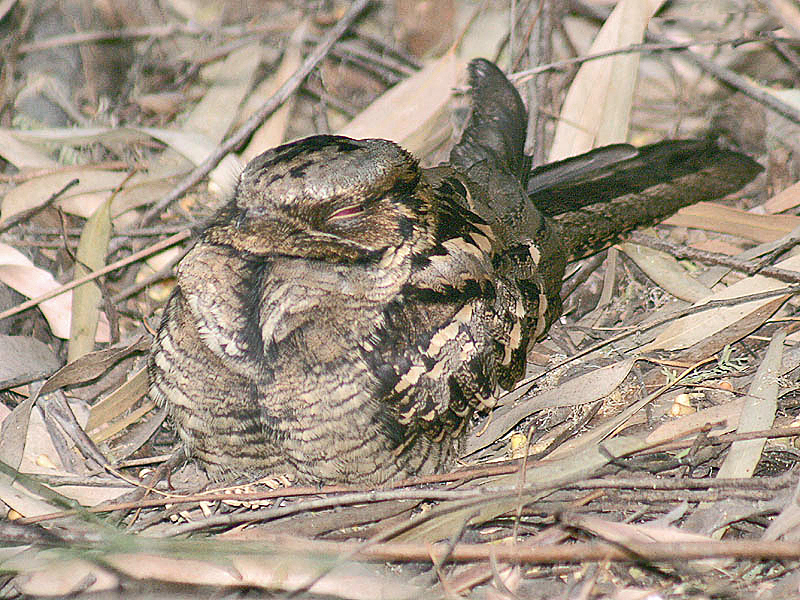
at Bharatpur, Rajasthan, India.

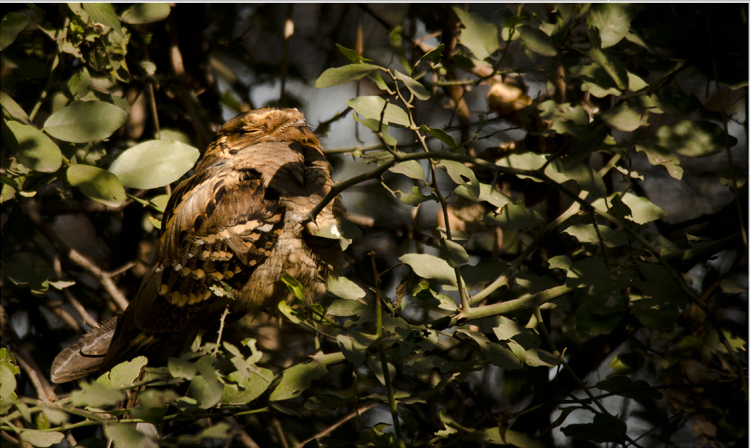
Large-tailed nightjar in Bharatpur.

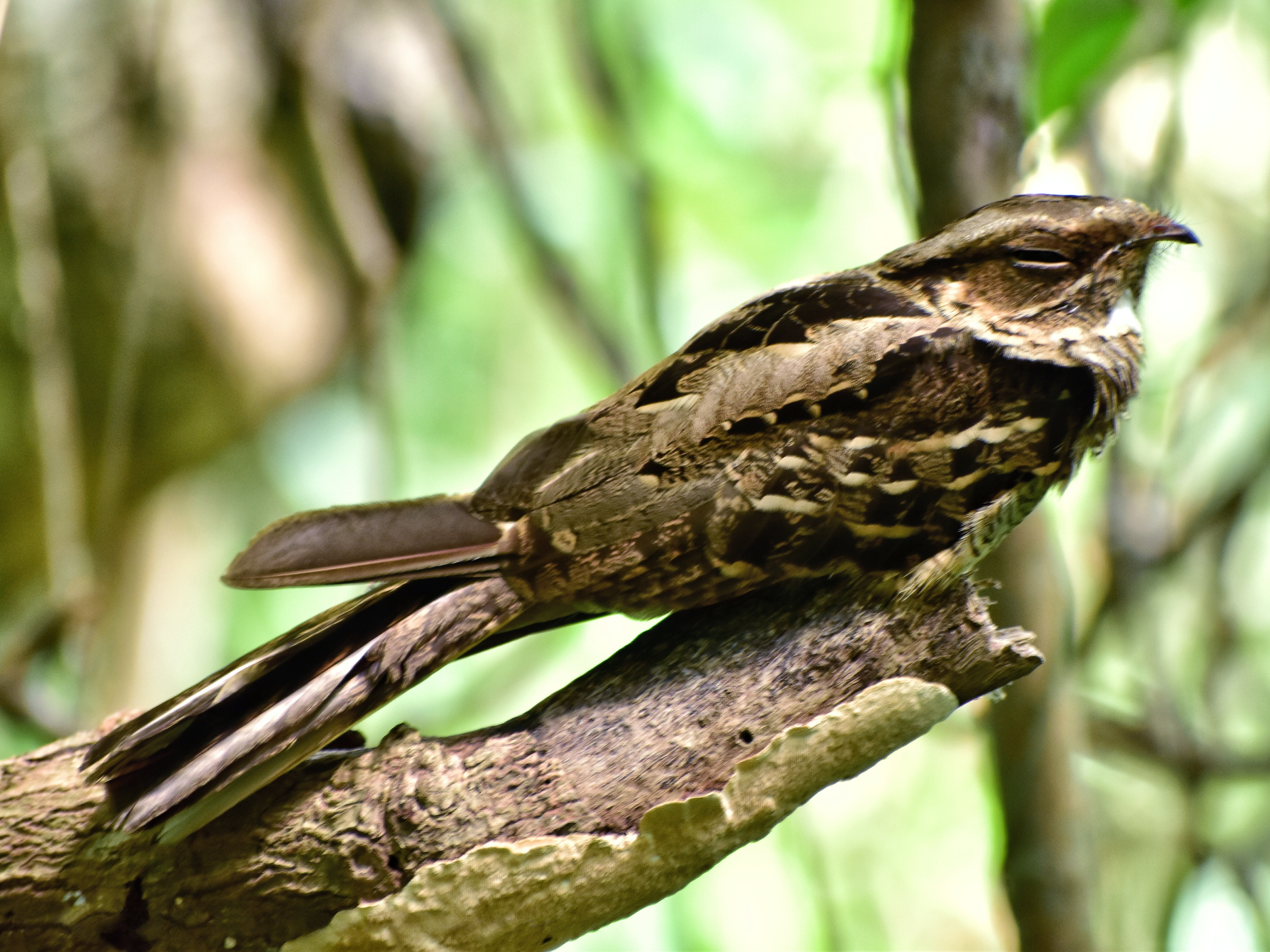
Large-tailed nightjar at Chintamani Kar Bird Sanctuary, West Bengal, India
