= Platter (dishware) =

Large flat dish

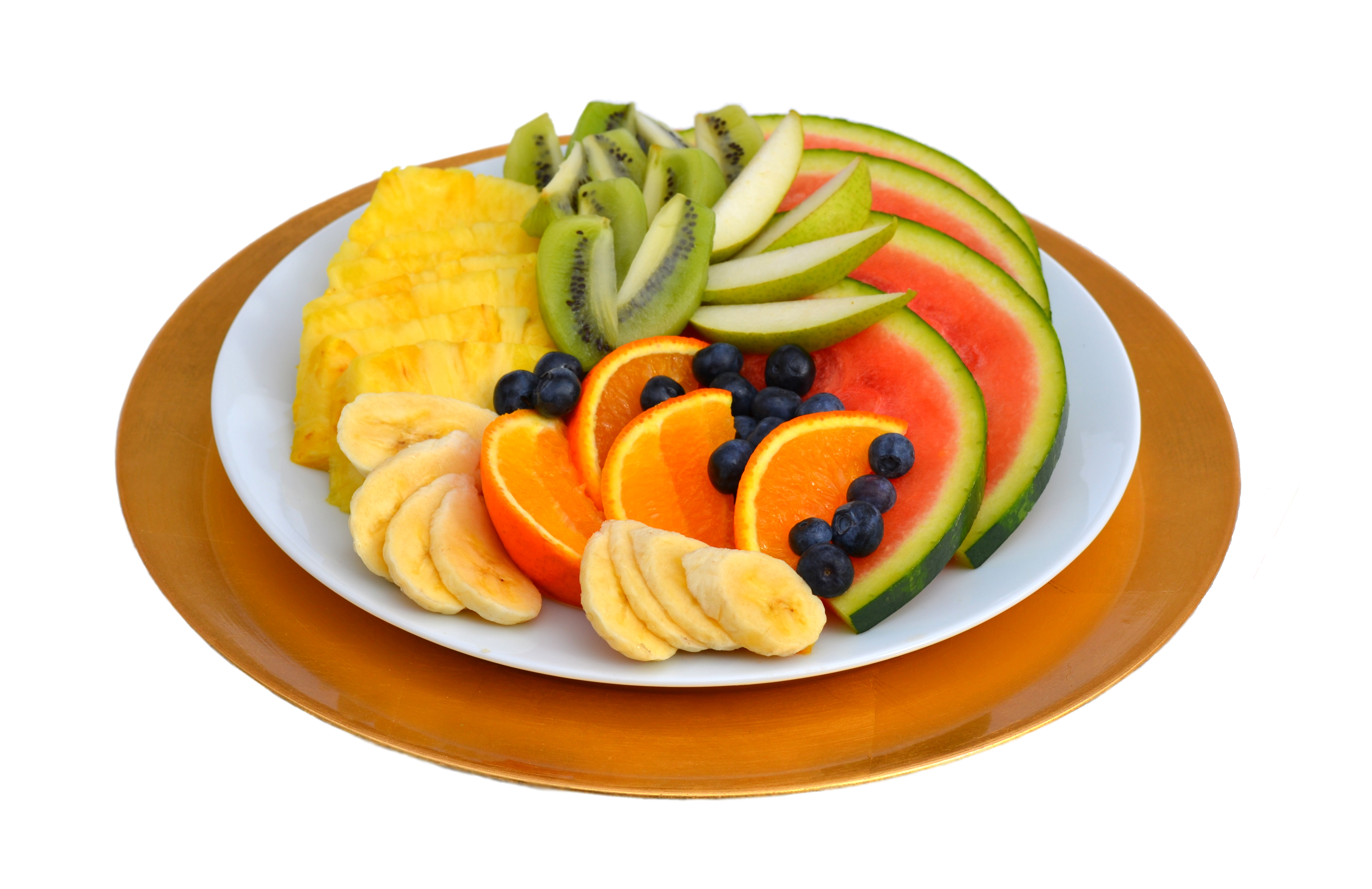
A platter of fruits

A platter is a large type of dishware used for serving food. It is a tray on which food is displayed and served to people. Its shape can be oval, round, octagonal, rectangular, or square.

It can be made of metal, ceramic, plastic, glass or wood. Plain and ornate platters suitable for more formal settings or occasions are made of, or plated with, silver, and antique examples are considered quite valuable. Especially expensive and ceremonial platters have been made of gold. Sizzling platters are heated so that the food on them sizzles; they are usually made of metal with an underliner.

In restaurant terminology, a platter is often a main dish served on a platter with one or more side dishes, such as a salad or french fries.

Notable platters includes the Colombian bandeja paisa, Indian thali or Arabic mixed-meat platters.

== Gallery ==
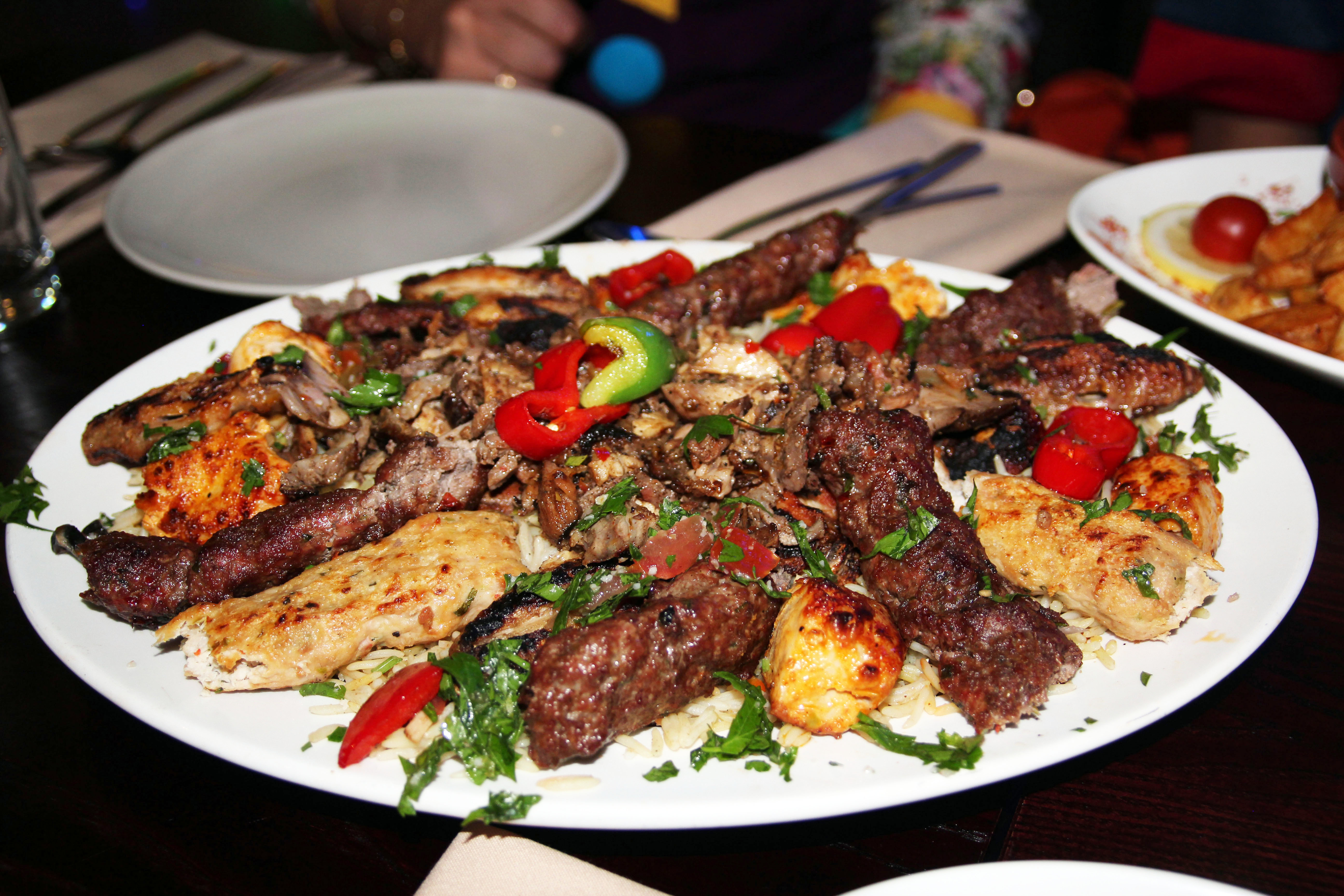
Mixed Arabic meat platter served on a bed of rice, in a restaurant in the United Kingdom

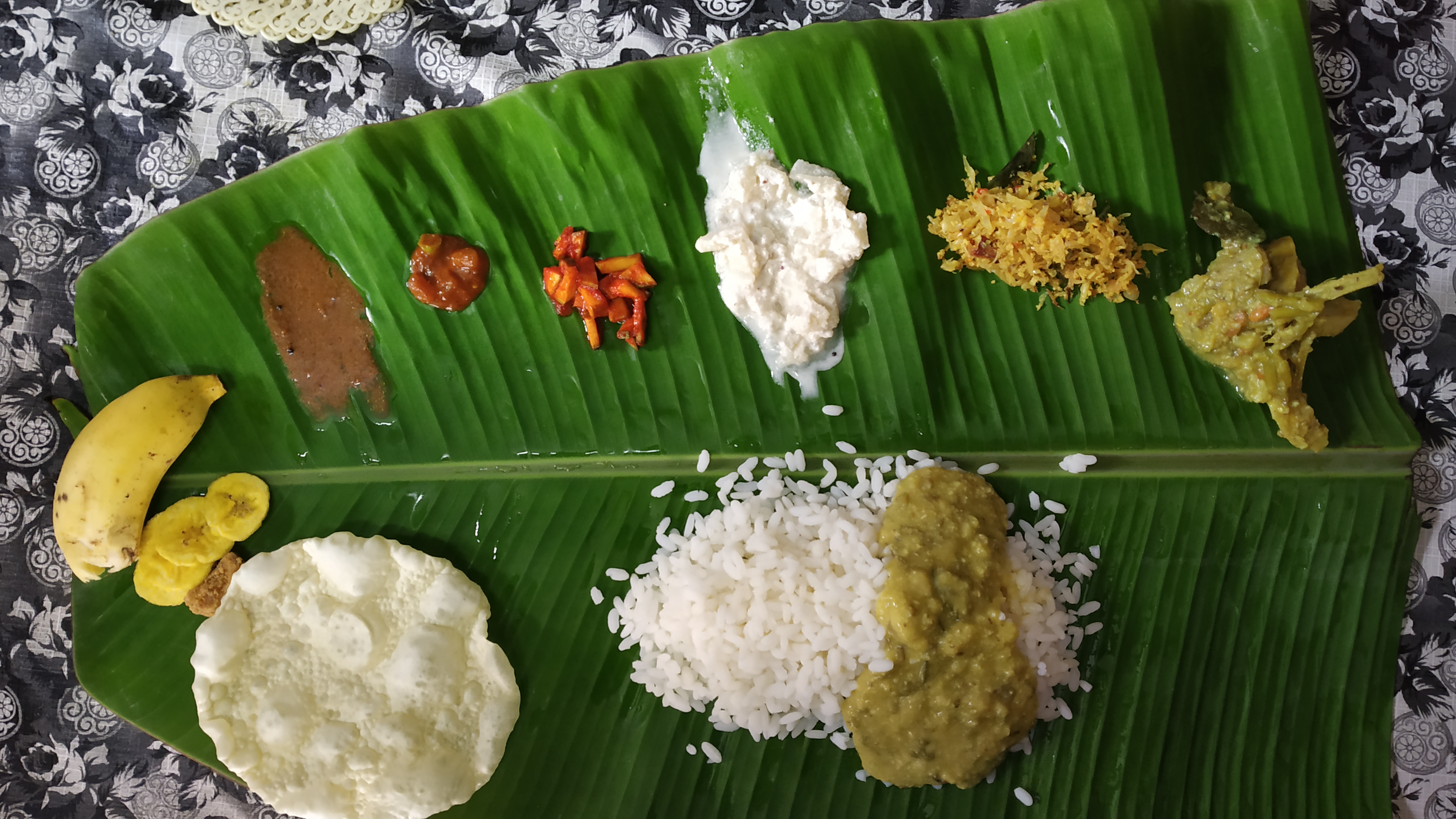
Sadya, a traditional platter originated from the Indian state of Kerala, served on Banana leaf

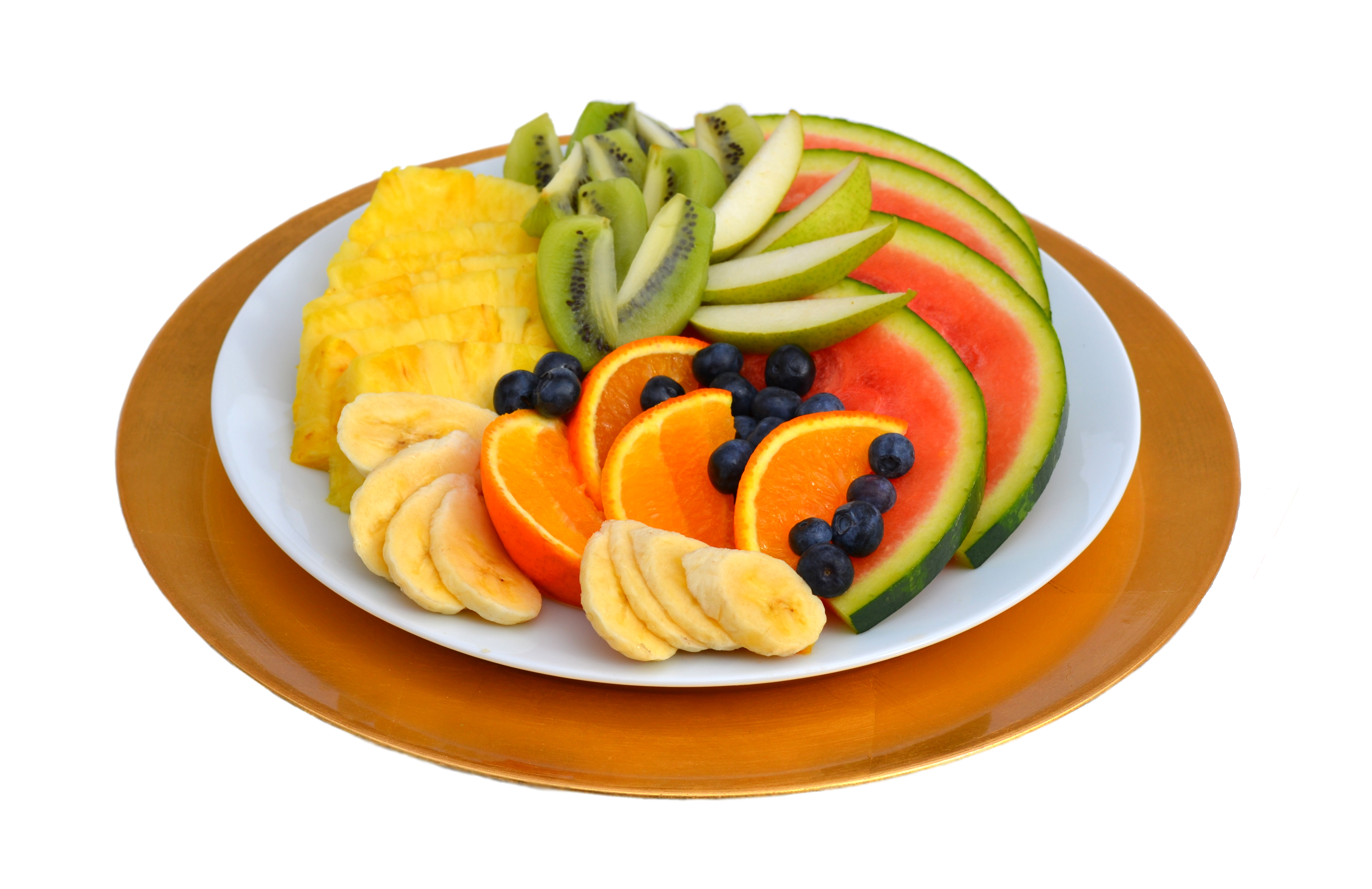
A platter of fruits

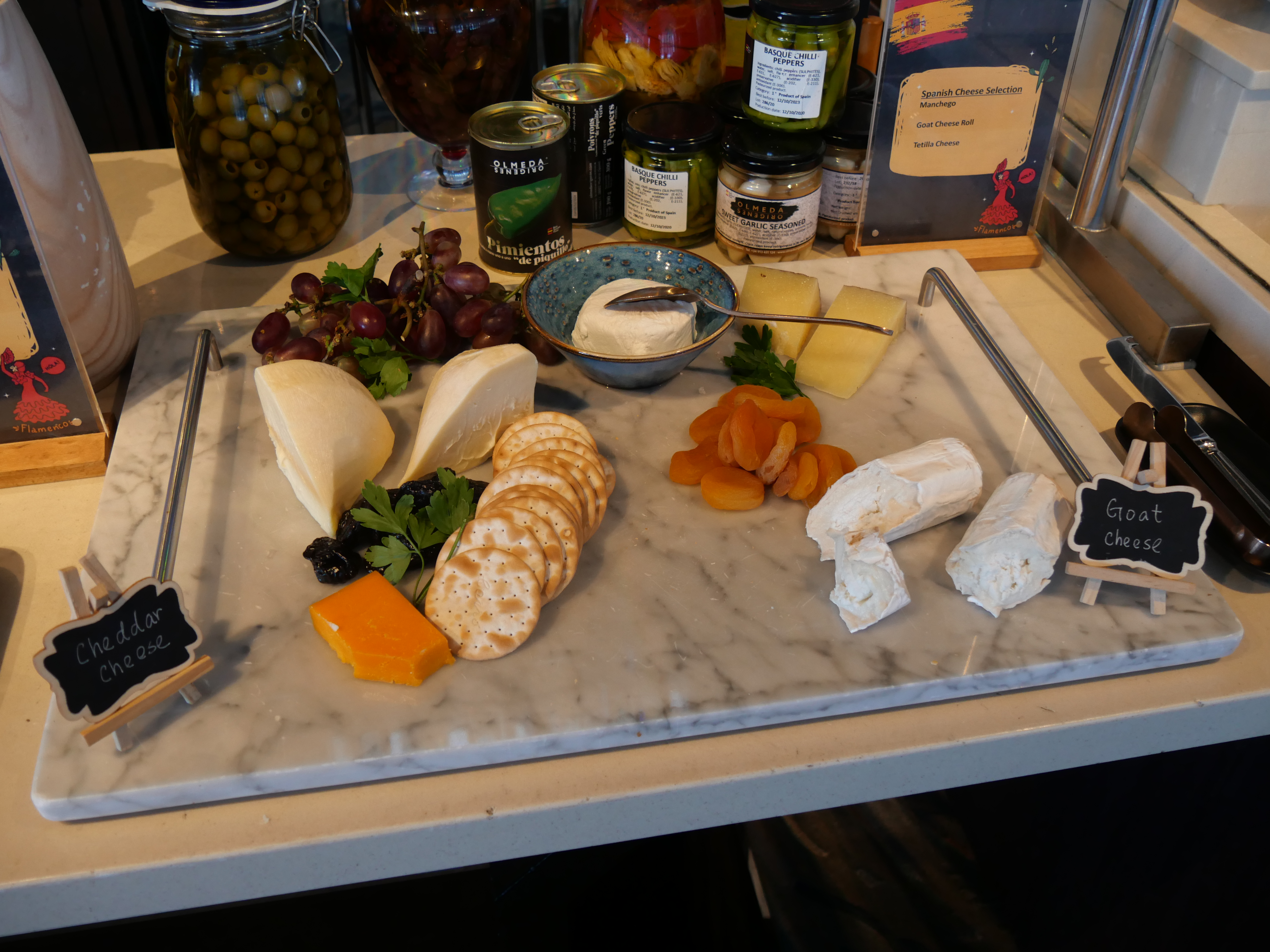
Five of Cheese on the platter

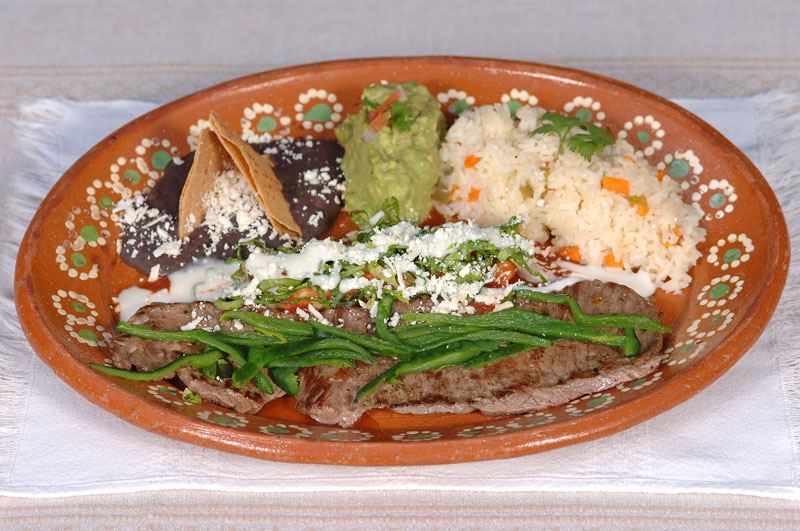
Carne a la tampiqueña on a platter.

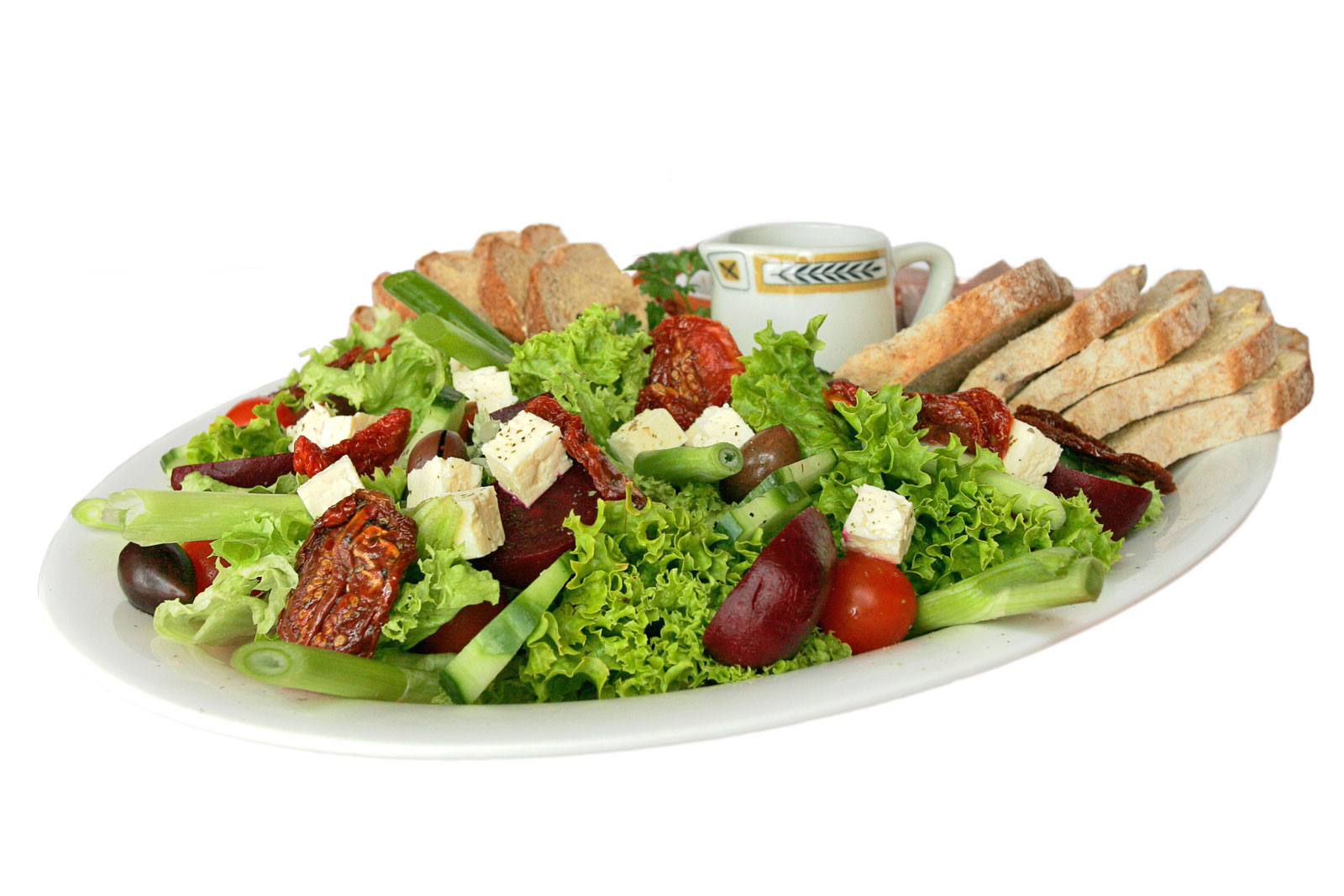
A salad platter.

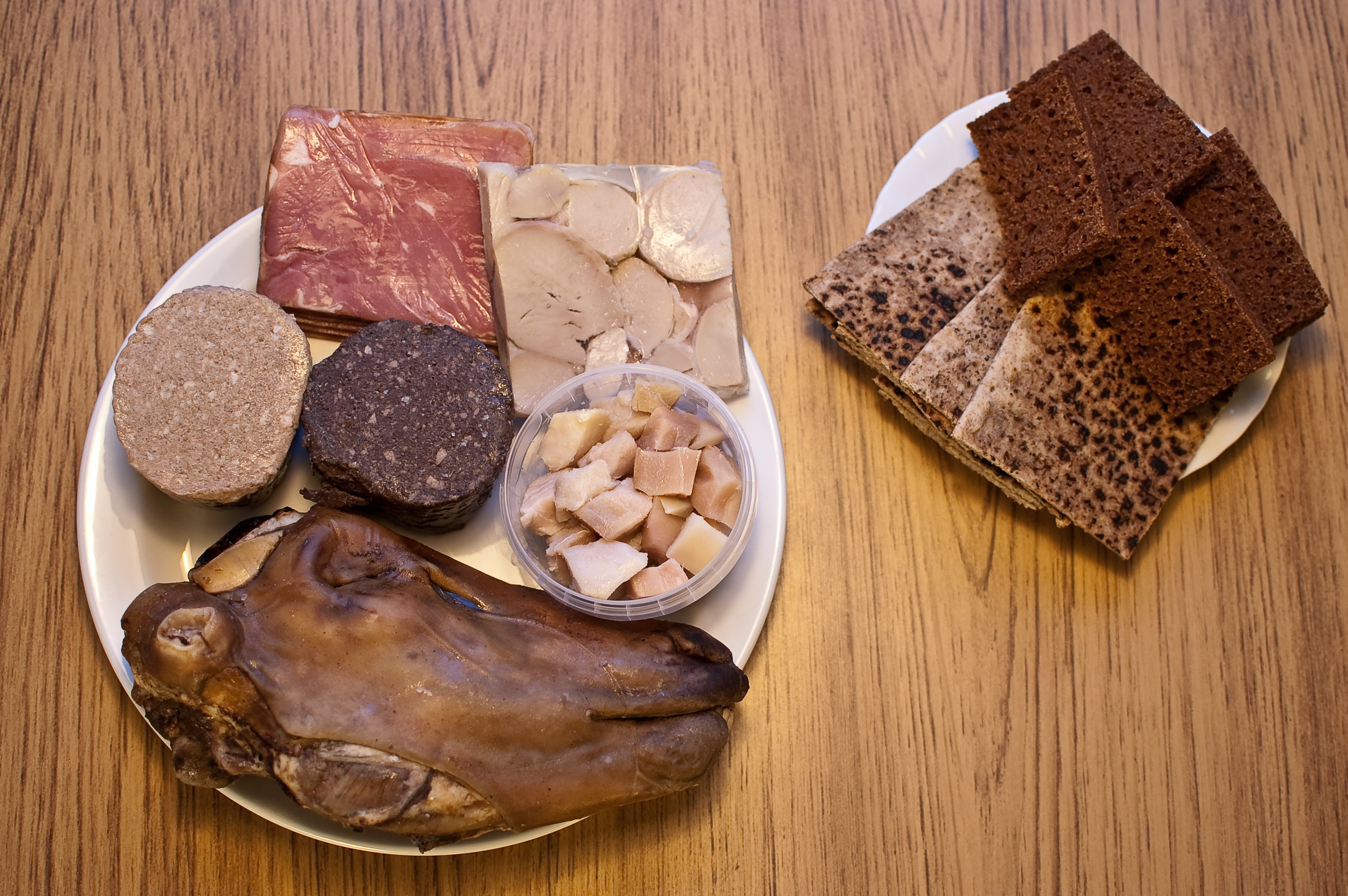
An Icelandic platter with goat head, head cheeses and cold meat

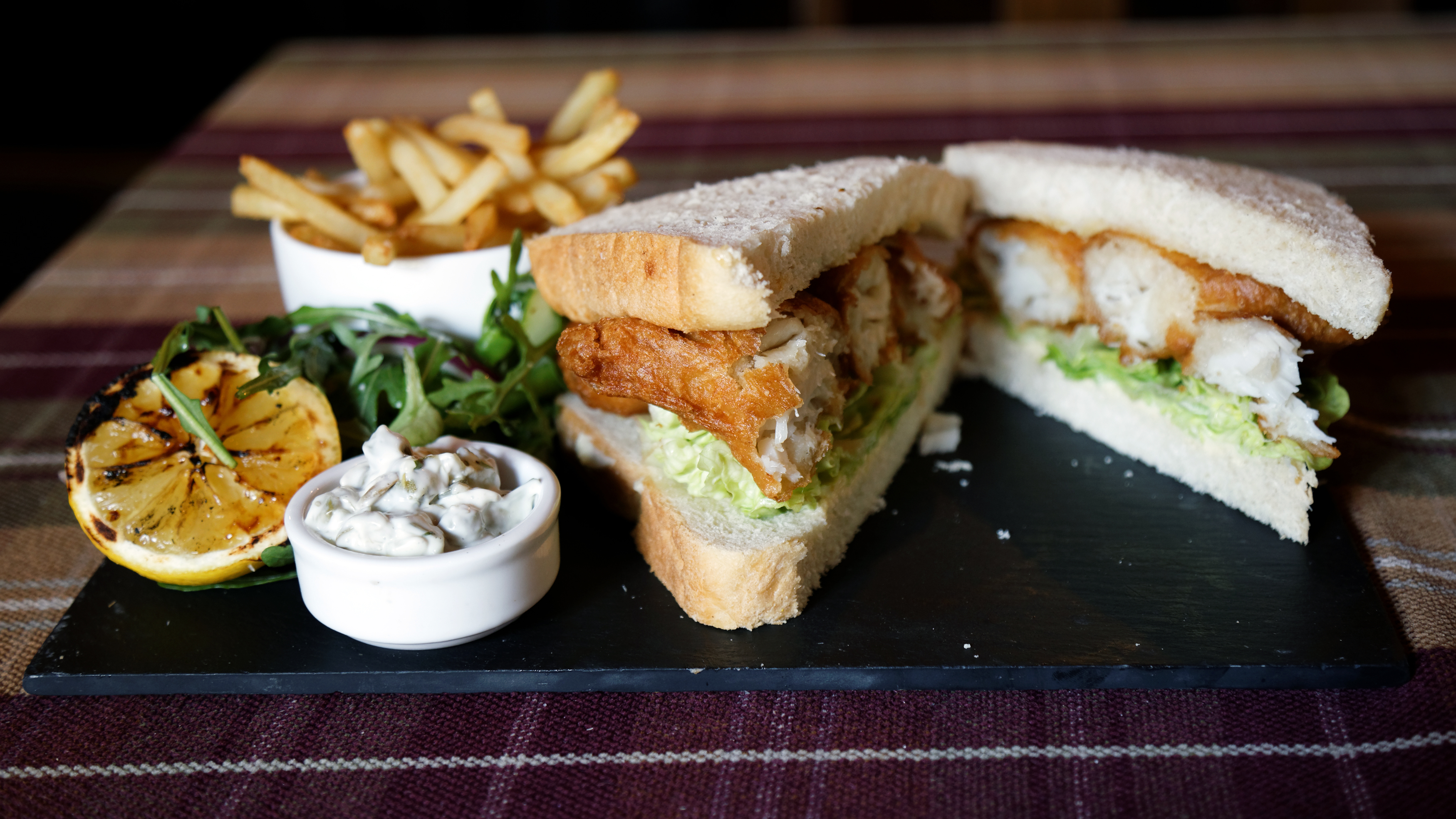
Fish Finger Sandwich platter

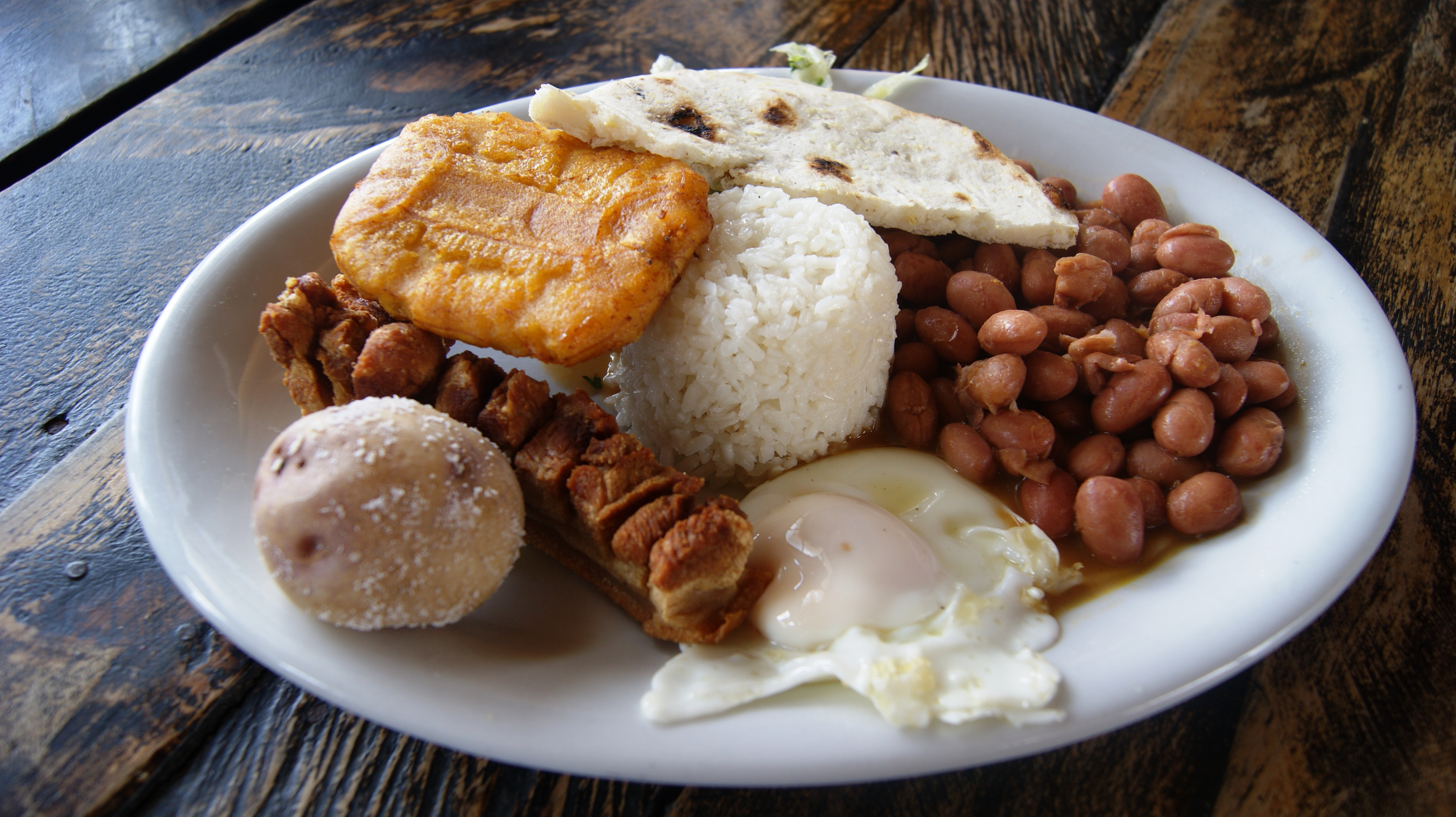
Bandeja paisa is a typical meal popular in Colombian cuisine. Paisa refers to the Paisa Region and bandeja is Spanish word for platter.

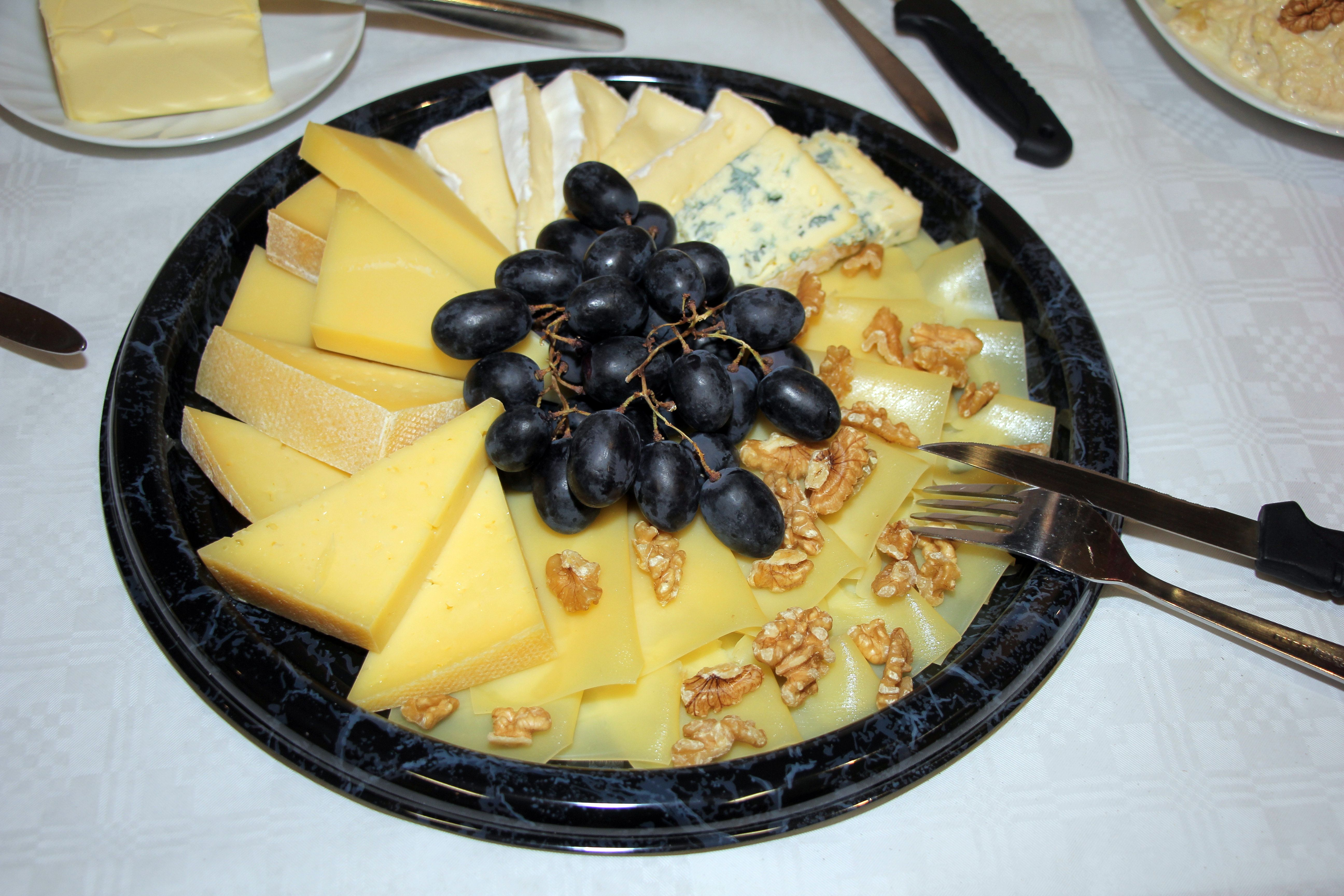
Cheese on a platter

== See also ==
- Thali
- In a basket
- Blue-plate special
- List of restaurant terminology
- Meat and three
- Nantaimori
