= Diner lingo =

Type of slang

An order being taken at Finch's Diner in Raleigh, NC

Diner lingo is a kind of American verbal slang used by cooks and chefs in diners and diner-style restaurants, and by the wait staff to communicate their orders to the cooks. Usage of terms with similar meaning, propagated by oral culture within each establishment, may vary by region or even among restaurants in the same locale.

== History ==
The origin of the lingo is unknown, but there is evidence suggesting it may have been used by waiters as early as the 1870s and 1880s. Many of the terms used are lighthearted and tongue-in-cheek and some are a bit racy or ribald, but are helpful mnemonic devices for short-order cooks and staff. Some of the terms are pre-existing slang, such as "Adam's ale" for water. Diner lingo was most popular in diners and luncheonettes from the 1920s to the 1970s.

== List of terms ==
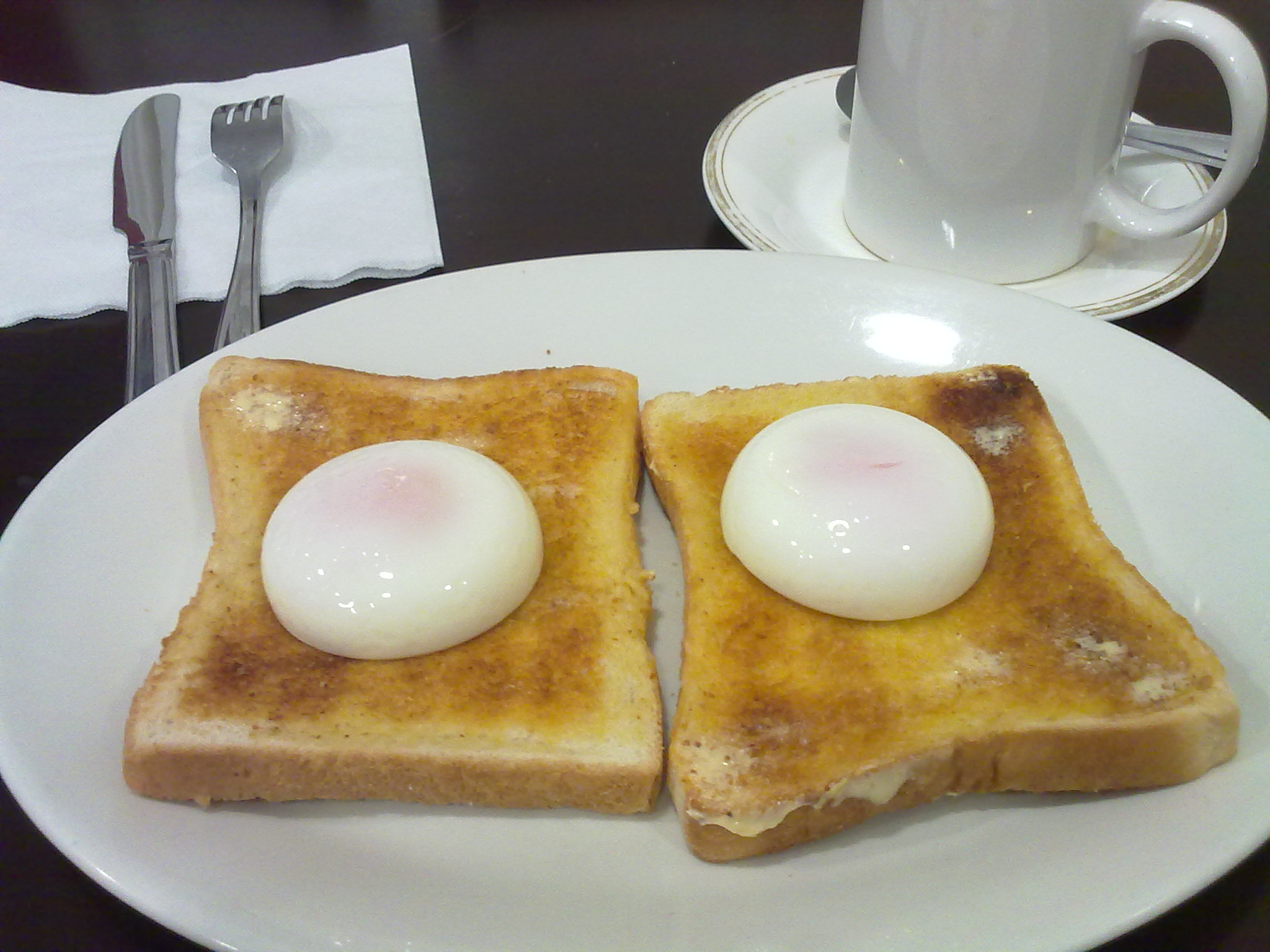
"Adam and Eve on a raft" – two poached eggs on toast

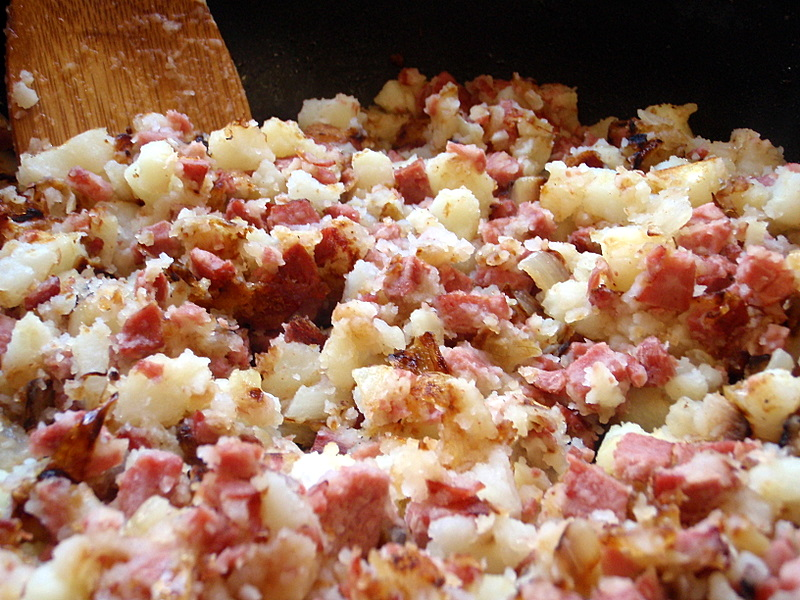
"Take a chance" – corned beef hash

- 86 – omit from an order; "hold"
- Adam and Eve on a raft – two poached eggs atop toast
- Adam's ale – water
- Angels on horseback – oysters wrapped in bacon
- Axle grease – butter or margarine
- B&B – bread and butter
- Baled hay – shredded wheat
- Bad breath – onions
- Bark – frankfurter (derived from the term 'hot dog' and the barking performed by dogs)
- Battle Creek in a bowl – bowl of corn flakes cereal; Battle Creek, Michigan is the birthplace of breakfast cereal
- Belly warmer – coffee
- BLT – bacon/lettuce/tomato sandwich
- Biddy board – French toast; "biddy" was a slang term for hens
- Blue plate special – a discount-priced meal that usually changes daily
- Blowout patches – pancakes
- Board – slice of toast
- Boiled leaves – hot tea
- Bowl of red – chili con carne
- Bow wow – hot dog
- Brick – biscuit
- Bridge/Bridge party – four of anything
- Bullets – beans
- Burn the British – toasted English muffin
- Cackleberries – eggs (cackle can refer to the cry of a hen when she lays an egg)
- Cats' eyes – tapioca pudding
- Checkerboard – waffle
- City juice – water (because water is supplied by the city)
- Coffee high and dry – black coffee (no cream or sugar)
- Cow paste – butter
- Dead eye – poached egg
- Dogs and maggots – crackers and cheese
- Drown the kids – boiled eggs
- Echo – repeat of the last order
- Eve with a lid – apple pie, alluding to the forbidden fruit
- Fish eyes – tapioca pudding
- Foreign entanglements – spaghetti
- Greasy spoon – slang term for a diner
- Guess water – soup
- Hemorrhage – ketchup
- Hockey puck – a well-done burger
- Halitosis – garlic; originated in the 1920s.
- Hot blond in sand – coffee with cream and sugar
- Hot top – hot chocolate or chocolate sauce
- Houseboat – banana split
- In the alley – served as a side dish
- In the weeds – overwhelmed
- Irish cherries – carrots
- Jamoka – coffee (blend of java + mocha)
- Java – coffee
- Jayne Mansfield – tall stack of pancakes, referring to her large breasts and the slang term stacked
- Jewish round – bagel
- Joe – coffee
- Life preserver – doughnut
- Looseners – prunes
- Lumber – a toothpick
- Machine oil – syrup
- Maiden's delight – cherries
- Make it cry – add onion
- Moo juice – milk
- Mug of murk – black coffee
- Mully – beef stew, from "mulligatawny"
- Nervous pudding – Jell-O
- O'Connors – potatoes, alluding to their stereotypical association with the Irish
- On the hoof – cooked rare (for any kind of meat, implying that it is so slightly cooked that the animal is still alive)
- Punk – bread; derived from the use of punk to refer to crumbling, dry wood suitable for lighting fires (as in a fireworks punk); it later was used to refer to moldy, crumbling bread
- Put wheels on it – carry-out order; to go
- Rabbit food – lettuce
- Radio sandwich – tuna fish sandwich, punning on tuner
- Ripper – a deep fried hot dog; the process sometimes causes the casing to rip
- Rush it – Russian dressing
- Sand – sugar
- Shingles with a shimmy and a shake – buttered toast with jam
- Shit on a shingle (S.O.S.) – chipped beef and milk gravy served on toast
- Sinker – doughnut, for its resemblance to a lifering
- Skid grease – butter
- Squeal – ham
- Sunny side up – a fried egg cooked on one side
- Sweepings – hash
- Take a chance – hash
- Tube steak – hot dog
- Two dots and a dash – two fried eggs and a strip of bacon
- Wet mystery – beef stew
- Whiskey down – rye toast; whiskey is often made from rye
- With the works – with everything on it (for a sandwich)
- Wreck 'em – scrambled eggs
- Yard bird – chicken, from Southern slang
- Yum yum – sugar

== See also ==
- List of restaurant terminology
