= List of restaurant terminology =

This is a list of restaurant terminology. A restaurant is a business that prepares and serves food and drink to customers in return for money, either paid before the meal, after the meal, or with a running tab. Meals are generally served and eaten on premises, but many restaurants also offer take-out and food delivery services. Restaurants vary greatly in appearance and offerings, including a wide variety of the main chef's cuisines and service models.

== Restaurant terminology ==
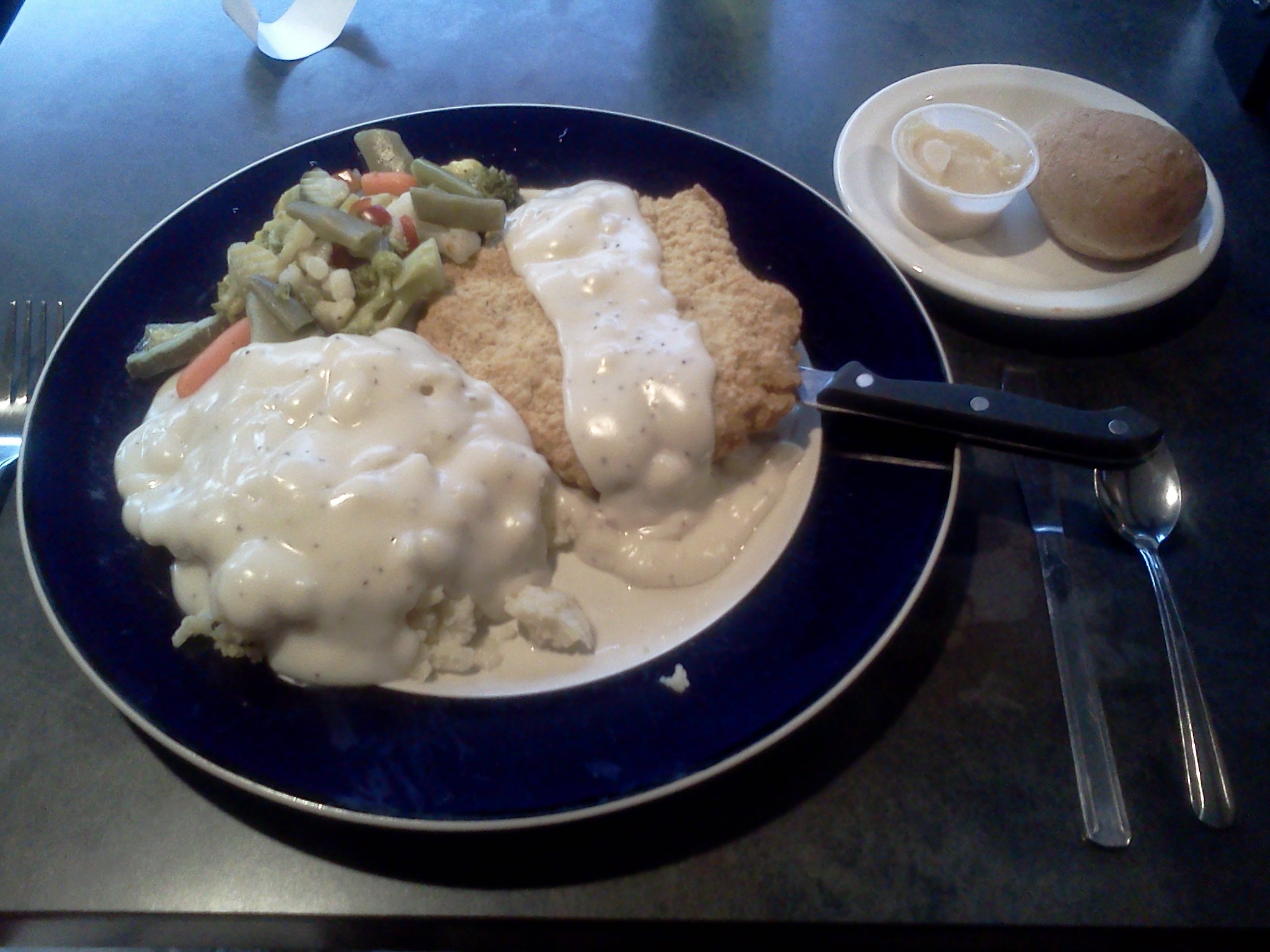
A blue-plate special

A garde manger chaud froid dish, used as a display piece

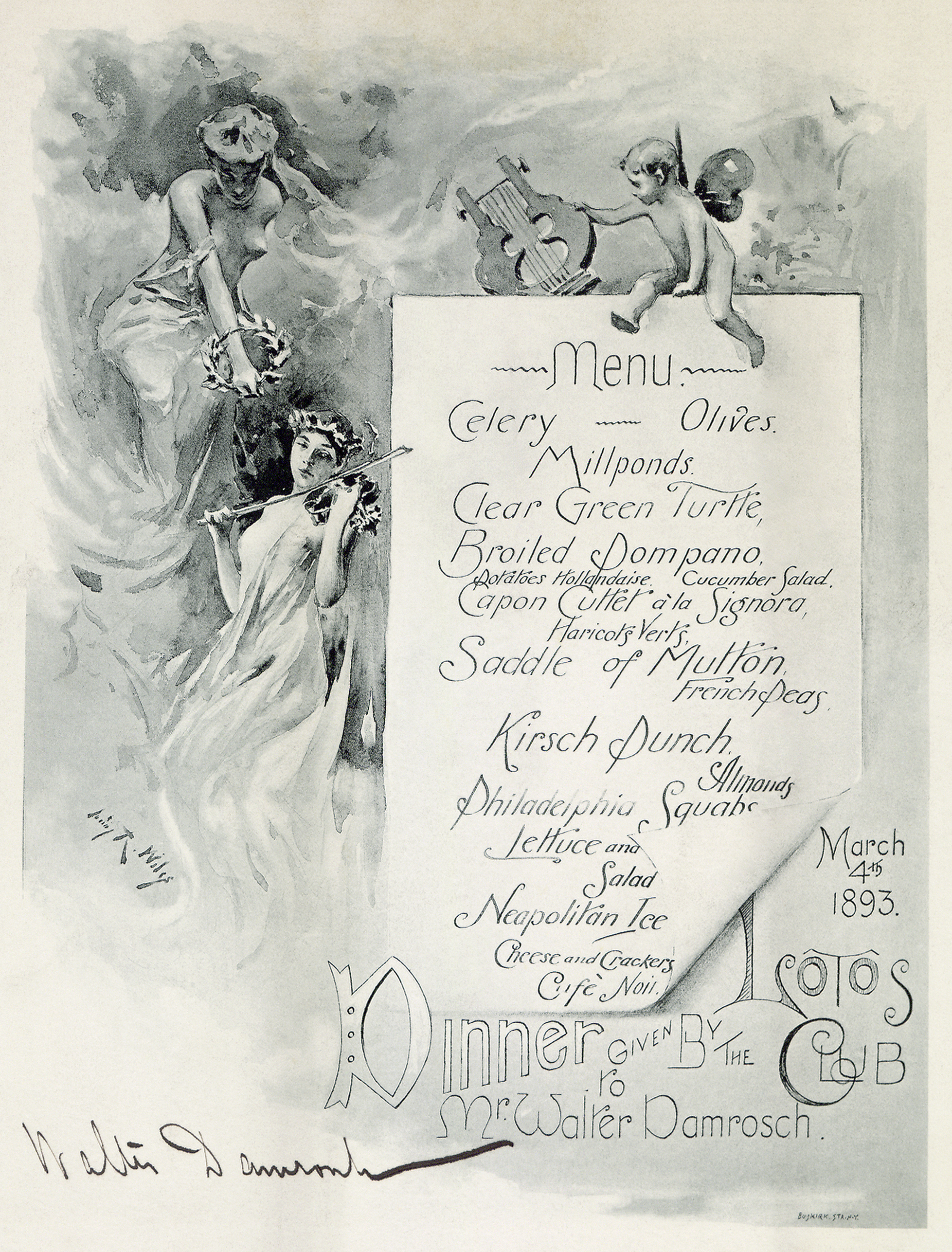
A table d'hôte menu from the New York City Lotos Club, 1893

- 86 – a term used when the restaurant has run out of, or is unable to prepare a particular menu item. The term is also generally used to mean getting rid of someone or something, including the situation where a bar patron is ejected from the premises and refused readmittance.
- À la carte
- All you can eat
- Bartender
- Blue-plate special
- Brigade de cuisine
- BYOB – an initialism standing for "bring your own bottle", "bring your own beer", "bring your own beverage", or "bring your own booze"
- Charcuterie
- Chef
- Chef de cuisine - also called "head chef" or "master chef"
- Chef's table
- Combination meal
- Cooked to order – food that is cooked to a patron's directions
- Counter meal
- Counter service
- Dine and dash
- Early bird dinner
- Entrée
- Family meal
- Fast food
- Free lunch
- Garde manger
- Ghost restaurant – a restaurant that operates exclusively via food delivery
- Gueridon service
- Happy hour
- Hotel manager
- Kids' meal
- Main course
- Maître d'hôtel
- Meat and three
- Meat and two veg – a British dish consisting of meat served with two varieties of vegetables
- Menu
- Mise en place
- Monkey dish – a small (3" or 5 cm) bowl used for sauces, nuts, or as a repository for bones or citrus peel
- Omakase
- On the fly
- One bowl with two pieces
- Online food ordering
- Plate lunch
- Platter (dinner)
- Rôtisseur
- Saucier
- Serving cart
- Signature dish
- Sous-chef – the chef who is second in command within a kitchen; sous meaning "under"
- Waiter
- Table d'hôte – a menu in which multi-course meals with only a few choices are charged at a fixed total price
- Table reservation
- Table service
- Table sharing
- Take-out
- Three-martini lunch
- Value meal

== See also ==
- Brigade de cuisine of Culinary arts
- Diner lingo – a kind of American verbal slang used by cooks
- Food industry
- Types of restaurants
- Waiting staff
