= Early bird dinner =

Meal options

Early bird dinner is a dinner served earlier than traditional dinner hours, particularly at a restaurant. Many establishments offer a seating prior to their main dinner seating with a reduced price menu, often more limited in selection than the standard dinner menu. Some restaurants offer specific meals or meal options which are sometimes referred to as "early bird specials". The term was first used for a clothing sale in 1904, and then in restaurants in the 1920s.

The hours which are deemed as "early bird" hours differ, depending on the locale and the establishment. Early bird seating may be as short as one hour or may be several hours long. It may use a prix fixe menu.

Generally, the idea is for the restaurant to increase revenue and profitability by offering lower-cost meals to attract price-sensitive customers, such as middle-class families and retired people, at a time when the restaurant would otherwise be empty.

== Rise and fall ==
The prevalence of early bird dinners at American restaurants increased in the 1970s, as inflation caused a rise in Social Security payments, and more retired people could afford to eat at a restaurant. In the early 21st century, the offer became less common, as retiring baby boomers avoided things they associated with their parents' generation, and other options, especially fast food restaurants and delicatessens within grocery stores, offered hot food at lower costs all day long. The offer has become more popular with some younger groups, especially when the economy is weaker.

== Stereotypes ==
Early bird dinners are often stereotypically associated with elderly people.. The association with lower-income elderly people has produced a stigma. This is sometimes avoided by re-branding the offering with names such as "twilight dinner", "sunset dinner" or "happy hour". Another approach is to offer other kinds of discounts, such as coupons or a menu with smaller portions at a lower cost.

== See also ==
- List of restaurant terminology
- Blue-plate special
- Happy hour
