= Aiseki =

Aiseki may refer to:

- Table sharing, common custom in crowded restaurants in Japan and elsewhere
- Sō Aiseki (僧愛石), late Edo period landscape painter in Japan
- Track 2 on Miyuki Nakajima's 2001 album Lullaby for the Soul
- 2010 episode of Japanese cartoon series Queen's Blade
