= Family meal =

Meal for staff at a restaurant

A family meal or staff meal is a group meal that a restaurant serves its staff outside of peak business hours. The restaurant provides the meal free of charge, as a perk of employment. Typically the meal is served to the entire staff at once, with all staff being treated equally, like a "family". The restaurant's own chefs (traditionally, but not always, the lowest in the pecking order) prepare the meal, often using leftover or unused ingredients. As a result, usually the meals do not involve dishes on the restaurant's regular menu. Chefs may also use the family meal to experiment with new recipes, or simply whip up something from their own ethnic backgrounds.

Several cookbooks have been published describing family meals at well-known restaurants. Examples include:

- The Family Meal: Home Cooking with Ferran Adria by Ferran Adrià of elBulli (2011)
- Staff Meals from Chanterelle by David Waltuck (2000)
- Off the Menu: Staff Meals from America's Top Restaurants by Marissa Guggiana (2011)
- Come In, We're Closed: An Invitation to Staff Meals at the World's Best Restaurants by Christine Carroll and Jody Eddy (2012)

== See also ==
- List of restaurant terminology
