= Greasy spoon =

Small and affordable restaurant

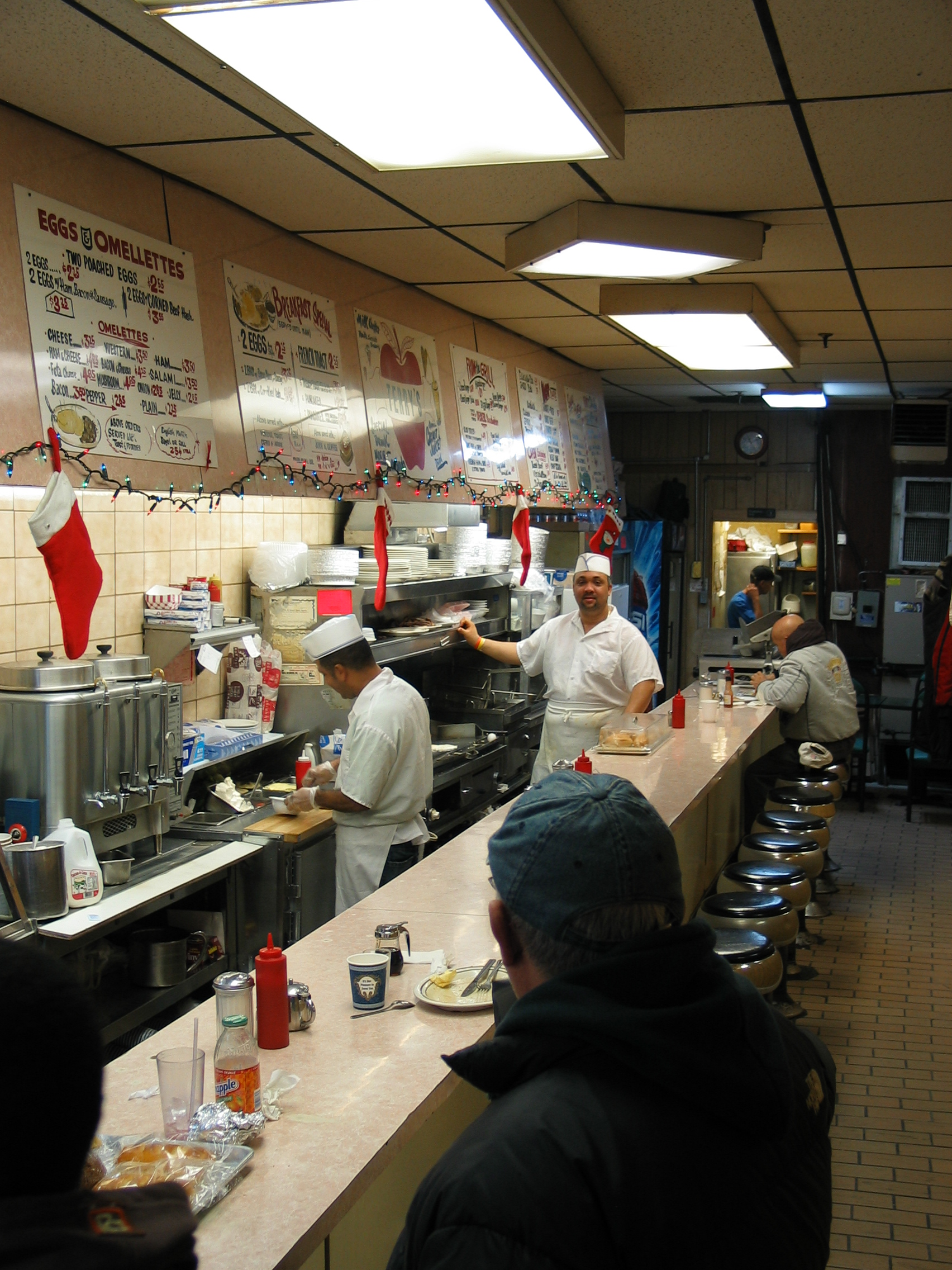
A counter in a diner in Brooklyn, New York

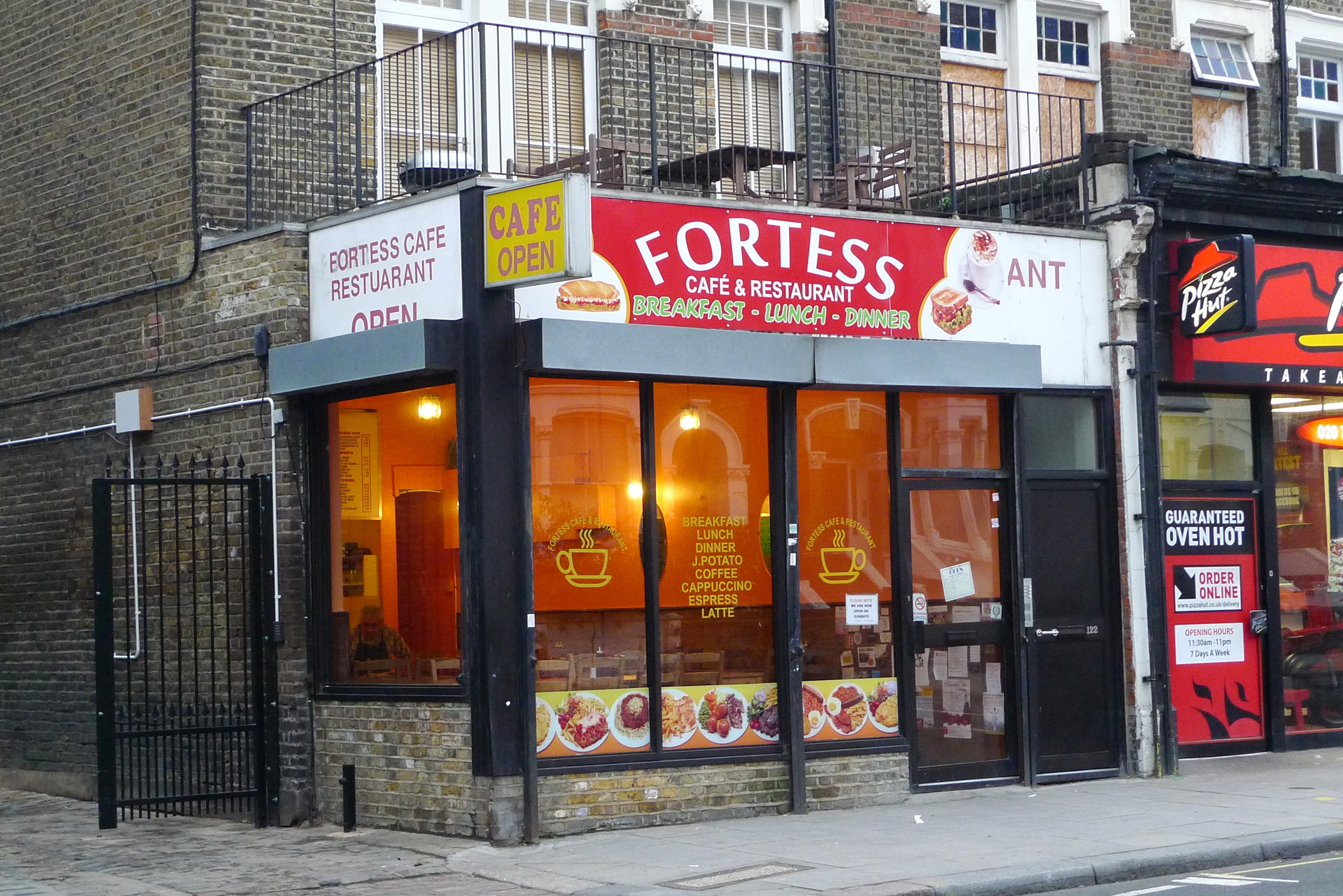
A typical British budget cafe in Tufnell Park, London

A greasy spoon is a small, cheap restaurant typically specializing in short order fare.

The term is also used in the UK, along with the informal term "caff" for café, to refer to a small, privately owned eatery that traditionally serves fry-ups and other quick meals.

== Term ==
The term greasy spoon—used to describe small and inexpensive diners and coffee shops—became popular in the United States as early as the 1920s.

Nicknaming cheap restaurants after an unwashed spoon dates back at least to 1848:

The Gabbione [in Rome] ... has withal an appearance so murky and so very far removed from cleanliness, that the Germans have bestowed upon it the appellation of the "Dirty Spoon".

The earliest appearance in print of the specific term "greasy spoon" was in 1906, in a story in Macmillan's Magazine, referring to an eatery in Paris frequented for a time by Robert Louis Stevenson:

A tradition exists in the studios of Montparnasse, where Stevenson has already become almost a legendary figure, that "cousin Bob" (R. A. M. Stevenson, the well-known art-critic) one day found his relative moping in the darkest corner of the Cremerie in the Rue Delambre, – an eating-house much frequented by artists, and familiarly known as The Greasy Spoon...

== Menu ==
Many typical American and Canadian greasy spoon diners focus on griddled, grilled, or fried food, such as hamburgers, french fries, chili, eggs and omelettes, bacon, sausages, pancakes, waffles, fried chicken, Spam, and fish and chips.

Sandwiches are also popular, as are beef stew, baked beans, and hearty soups. Regional fare is often served. Since the 1970s, many Greek immigrants have entered the business. Coffee, iced tea, and soft drinks are the typical beverages, as alcohol is usually not offered due to the prohibitive cost of a liquor license. Pie, savouries and ice cream are popular snacks and desserts.

A typical American greasy spoon or diner may offer a full meal for a special price, sometimes called a blue-plate special. A British or Irish cafe will typically offer a "full cooked breakfast" all day.

== Popular culture ==
Although there are now far fewer establishments due to the dominance of corporate fast food restaurant chains, a certain nostalgia exists surrounding a greasy spoon. Evocative characteristics include "counter service", jukeboxes, and hearty comfort cuisine. The greasy spoon as a setting is a common trope in movies and TV shows.

Restaurateur and television personality Guy Fieri, on Food Network's Diners, Drive-Ins and Dives, pays homage to such eateries across the United States.

Comic strips and humorous magazines have often lampooned the greasy spoon diner. The Better Half had Bert's Beanery, and Dagwood Bumstead continues to eat at Lou's Diner in Blondie. The kitchen and mess hall in Beetle Bailey provide the military equivalent of a greasy spoon. The cartoon series Bob's Burgers takes place in a modern-day greasy spoon. The Krusty Krab from popular cartoon SpongeBob SquarePants is sometimes referred to in the show itself as a greasy spoon, though its more comparable to a standard fast food restaurant, minus the drive-thru. Cooks featured in these tropes tend to be unkempt in some way – hirsute, unshaven, tattooed, wearing a stain-covered apron, or smoking a cigarette while working.

== See also ==
- Bar mleczny
- Cafe (British)
- Cha chaan teng, Hong-Kong style greasy spoon
- Coney Island (restaurant)
- Dhaba, an Indian diner
- List of diners
- Lunch counter
- Mamak stall
- Meat and three
- Mickey's Diner
- Nick Tahou Hots
- Pat's Hubba Hubba
- Public house
  - List of public house topics
- Salisbury House (restaurant)
- Waffle House
