= Happy hour =

Marketing term for a sales promotion of alcoholic drinks

Happy hour is a marketing term for a time of day when a venue such as a restaurant or bar offers reduced prices on alcoholic drinks. Menu items like appetizers are also often offered at a discounted price during happy hour. This is a way for bars and restaurants to draw in more business before or after peak business hours.

== Origin ==
The words "happy" and "hour" have appeared together for centuries when describing pleasant times. In Act I, Scene 2 of William Shakespeare's Henry V, he says, "Therefore, my lords, omit no happy hour/That may give furtherance to our expedition..." The use of the phrase "happy hour" to refer to a scheduled period of entertainment is, however, more recent.

One possible origin of the term "happy hour," in the sense of a scheduled period of entertainment, is from the United States Navy. The name "Happy Hour Club," "Happy Hour Social Club," and similar variants had been in use as the names of social clubs, primarily by women's social clubs, since at least the early 1880s.

In early 1913, a group of homemakers called the "Happy Hour Social" organised "semi-weekly smokers" on board USS Arkansas. By June 1913, the crew of Arkansas had started referring to their regularly scheduled smokers as happy hours. The happy hours included a variety of entertainment, including boxing and wrestling matches, music, dancing, and movies. By the end of World War I, the practice of holding happy hours had spread throughout the Navy.

The idea of drinking before dinner has its roots in the Prohibition era. When the 18th Amendment and the Volstead Act were passed banning alcohol consumption, people would host "cocktail hours", also known as "happy hours", at a speakeasy before eating at restaurants where alcohol could not be served. Cocktail lounges continued the trend of drinking before dinner.

The Random House Dictionary of American Slang dates "Happy hour," as a term for afternoon drinks in a bar, to a Saturday Evening Post article on military life in 1959. The article detailed the lives of government contractors and military personnel who worked at missile-tracking facilities in the Caribbean and the Atlantic. "Except for those who spend too much during 'happy hour' at the bar – and there are few of these – the money mounts up fast." Barry Popick's online etymology dictionary The Big Apple lists several pre-1959 citations to "Happy Hour" in print, mostly from places near naval bases in California, from as early as 1951.

== Regulations ==
=== Canada ===
The Province of Alberta created restrictions to happy hours that took effect in August 2008. All such promotions must end at 8:00 p.m, and drink prices must conform to the Alberta Gaming and Liquor Commission's minimum price regulations at all times.

In Ontario, while establishments may vary liquor prices as long as they stay above the minimum prices set by the Alcohol and Gaming Commission of Ontario, they are not permitted to advertise these prices "in a manner that may promote immoderate consumption." Formerly, the phrase "happy hour" could not be used in such advertisement. That restriction was removed in 2019.

=== Ireland ===
Happy hour has been illegal in the Republic of Ireland since 2003, under the Intoxicating Liquor Act.

=== Netherlands ===
The Koninklijke Horeca Nederland (KHN), a hospitality sector lobby group, agreed with its members to stop happy hours to discourage binge drinking by youth, but only if the government would vote to not raise the minimum drinking age. In March 2013, the law to raise the drinking age to 18 was passed.

=== United Kingdom ===
The National Mandatory Licensing Conditions introduced in 2010 required licensees to take "all reasonable steps" to prevent irresponsible drinks promotions which effectively banned traditional happy hours. Under the 2014 revision to these conditions, the licensee "must ensure" such promotions do not take place, although there is a subjective test, that takes account of the kind of establishment and its track record, for any promotions that offer unlimited or unspecified alcohol free or for a fixed or discounted fee.

==== Glasgow ====
In 2004, Glasgow banned happy hours to reduce binge drinking.

=== United States ===
Massachusetts was the first U.S. state to implement a statewide ban on happy hours in 1984. Several other U.S. states also have similar restrictions. The reasons for each ban vary, but include preventing drunk driving, avoiding the nuisance to neighbors from loud crowds and public drunkenness, and discouraging unhealthy consumption of a large amount of alcohol in a short time.

In 1984, the U.S. military abolished happy hours at military base clubs. In 2011, the Utah State Legislature passed a ban on happy hours. In July 2011, Pennsylvania extended the period of allowable time for happy hour from two hours to four hours. In June 2012, happy hour became legal in Kansas after a 26-year ban. In July 2015, a 25-year happy hour ban was ended in Illinois.

As of July 2015, happy hour bans existed in Alaska, Hawaii, Indiana, Maine, Massachusetts, North Carolina, Oklahoma, Rhode Island, Utah, and Vermont. A bill filed in 2023 in the North Carolina General Assembly would end the state ban on happy hours, but the bill is still pending.

== For other services ==
By extension, certain file-hosting websites such as RapidShare and Megaupload use the term "happy hour" to designate periods during which users have complimentary access to certain premium features, such as increased bandwidth, elimination of queues, and bypassing of CAPTCHA verifications.

== See also ==
- Apéritif and digestif, drinks served before and after dinner
- Free lunch, another means of promotion
- List of public house topics
- List of restaurant terminology
- Early bird dinner, a time-based discounted restaurant meal
