= Chumley's =

Historic pub in New York City

Coordinates: 40°43′57″N 74°00′19″W

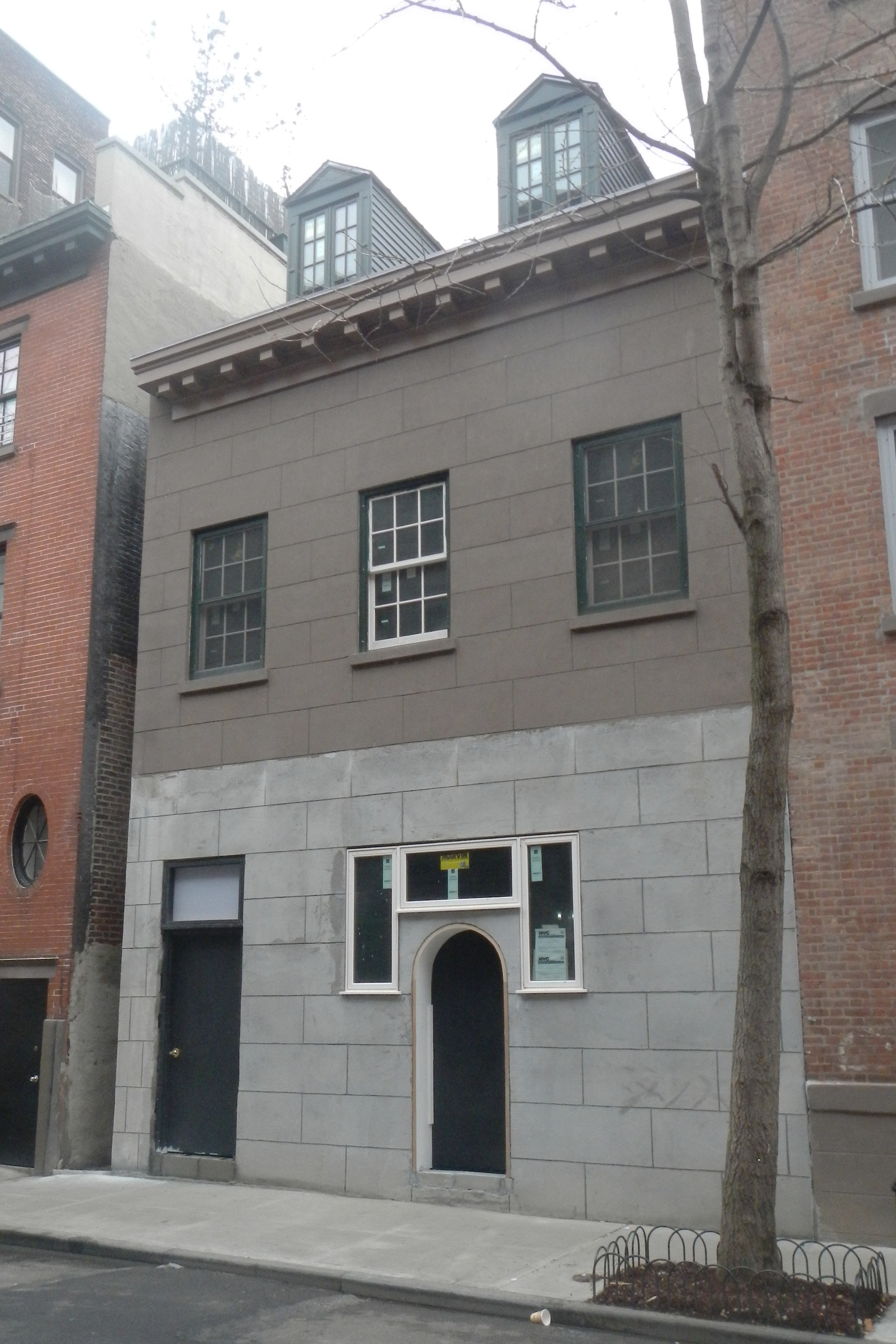
Chumley's on Bedford Street, closed for renovations in 2013

Chumley's was a historic pub and former speakeasy at 86 Bedford Street, between Grove and Barrow Streets, in the West Village neighborhood of Greenwich Village, Manhattan, New York City. It was established in 1922 by the socialist activist Leland Stanford Chumley, who converted a former blacksmith's shop near the corner of Bedford and Barrow Streets into a Prohibition-era drinking business. The speakeasy became a favorite spot for influential writers, poets, playwrights, journalists, and activists, including members of the Lost Generation and the Beat Generation movements.

After a major renovation, it re-opened in October 2016 as a reservations-only dinner restaurant, but closed in March 2020 as a result of the New York City Coronavirus lockdown. A permanent closure was announced in July 2020.

== History ==
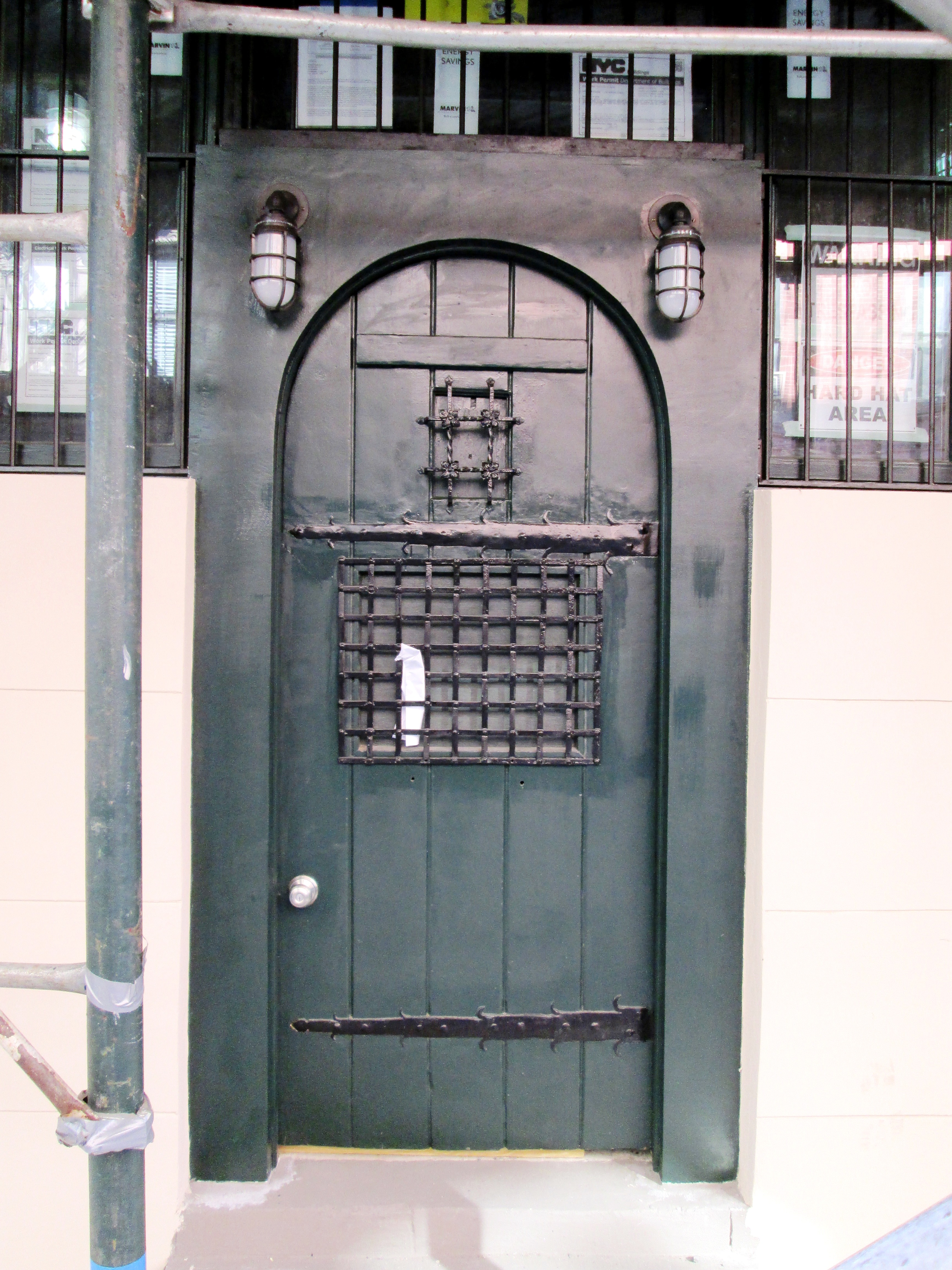
The unmarked Bedford Street door in 2015

Some features remain from Chumley's Prohibition-era history. Notably, the Barrow Street entrance has no exterior sign, being located at the end of an undistinguished courtyard ("The Garden Door"), while the Bedford Street entrance, which opens to the sidewalk, is also unmarked. Inside, Chumley's is still equipped with the trap doors and secret stairs that composed part of its elaborate subterfuge.

It is also rumored that the term "86" originated when an unruly guest was escorted out of the Bedford St. door, which held the address "86 Bedford St". A different version referencing Chumley's is offered in Jef Klein's book The History and Stories of the Best Bars of New York: "When the cops would very kindly call ahead before a [prohibition-era] raid, they'd tell the bartender to '86' his customers, meaning they should exit via the 86 Bedford door, while the police would come to the Pamela Court entrance."

A plaque at the tavern, dated September 22, 2000, and placed by Friends of Libraries USA, stated that Chumley's has been placed on a Literary Landmarks Register and goes on to describe Chumley's as:

A celebrated haven frequented by poets, novelists and playwrights, who helped define twentieth century American literature. These writers include Willa Cather, E.E. Cummings, Theodore Dreiser, William Faulkner, Ring Lardner, Edna St. Vincent Millay, Eugene O'Neill, John Dos Passos, and John Steinbeck.

Posted on the walls of Chumley's were the covers of books supposedly worked on there. Owing to its historical significance, Chumley's is a stopping-place for various literary tours. Reportedly, Edna St. Vincent Millay was not only a patron, but an occasional bartender.

Chumley's was closed after the chimney in its dining room collapsed on April 5, 2007.

=== Rebuilding and reopening (2012-2019) ===
An article in The New York Times of December 31, 2012, detailed the rebuilding process. The building that housed Chumley's was linked to four others, all damaged since the wall collapse in 2007. Several buildings were completed and became condominiums. The space that housed Chumley's needed to obtain a new permit before it could re-open as a bar.

After extensive renovation, Chumley's officially re-opened on October 18, 2016, as a reservations-only dinner restaurant featuring upscale bar food and "mixology" drinks. The dining room was about 10% smaller in height and width than it had been before, because of the extent of the damage caused by the collapse. The "Garden Door" was also permanently closed. The new owner was Alessandro Borgognone, who also owned the nearby Sushi Nakazawa.

=== Closure (2020-2021) ===
TimeOut noted that in its five-year run, it was "well regarded and stayed popular". Chumley's was closed on March 22, 2020, due to the COVID-19 pandemic in New York City. After a few months of lockdown, a permanent closure was announced in July 2020. The contents were scheduled for auction by A. J. Wilner Auctions on July 29, 2020; this date was changed to April 2021. It remained closed in October 2021.

=== Frog Club (2024) ===
In February 2024, a new restaurant named Frog Club opened in the former Chumley's building. It closed in December 2024.

=== The Eighty Six (2025 - Present) ===
In September 2025, a new steakhouse named the Eighty Six opened in the former Chumley's building.

== In popular culture ==
- Chumley's was fictionalized as "Cleary's" in the 1943 film noir The Seventh Victim, set in Greenwich Village.
- Chumley's was mentioned in Mad Men (Season 1, Episode 7, "Red in the Face" and Season 4, Episode 7, "Christmas Comes but Once a Year") as a place where the staff were going for after-work drinks.
- Chumley's was mentioned in the television series Elementary (Season 3, Episode 14, "The Female of Species"). Sherlock determined that a suspect evaded police surveillance by using an old tunnel which was underneath the floor of the suspect's apartment. On the other side of that tunnel was the 86 Bedford St. door to Chumley's. Sherlock also explains the origins of the term "86".
- Chumley's was mentioned in the John Connolly book "Every Dead Thing".
- Chumley's was mentioned in the Teddy Wayne book "Apartment".
- Chumley's was mentioned in Kinky Friedman's book "Greenwich Killing Time".
- Chumley's was mentioned in Alison Bechdel's graphic memoir "Fun Home".
