= Short order cooking =

Fast preparation of restaurant foods

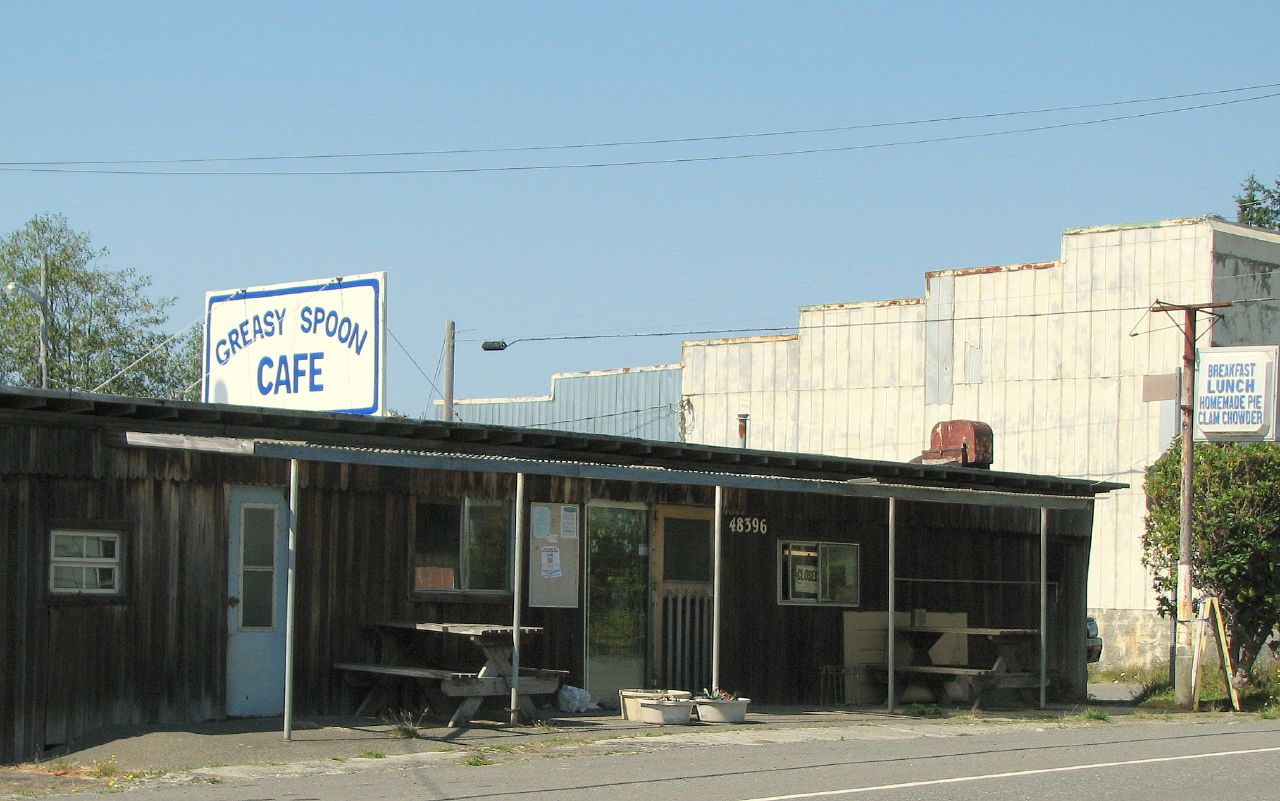
Short order cooking is common at greasy spoon and diner restaurants.

Short order cooking is the preparation of inexpensive restaurant foods that are quick to cook. Many small eateries serve only short-order items, which include griddled, fried, and grilled foods and sandwiches. Short order cooking is common at greasy spoons and diners.

A cook responsible for short order cooking is a short order cook. The U.S. Bureau of Labor Statistics defines the role of short order cooks as those who "prepare and cook to order a variety of foods that require only a short preparation time. May take orders from customers and serve patrons at counters or tables", and it specifically excludes fast food cooks. As of May 2019, the U.S. Bureau of Labor Statistics estimates there were more than 150,000 short order cooks in the United States.

Diner lingo is a language associated with short order cooking.
