= BYOB =

Acronym concerning alcohol (or marijuana)

BYOB or BYO is an initialism and acronym concerning wine ("bring your own bottle"), liquor ("bring your own booze"), beer ("bring your own beer"), or marijuana ("bring your own bud").

BYOB is stated on an invitation to indicate that the host will not be providing alcohol, and that guests should bring their own. Some restaurants and business establishments (especially in areas where liquor licenses are difficult to obtain) allow patrons to bring their own bottle, sometimes subject to opening fees or membership conditions.

== Etymology ==
Today, BYOB may mean "bring your own bottle" or "bring your own booze". BYOB is a later variant of the earlier expression, BYOL, meaning "bring your own liquor." The earliest known examples of BYOL appeared in two panels of a cartoon by Frank M. Spangler in the Montgomery Advertiser (Montgomery, Alabama), December 26, 1915, page 5. The joke was that a man received an invitation with the mysterious letters "BYOL" in place of RSVP. He looked up the initials in a "social directory" and learned that it stood for "Bring Your Own Liquor".

Other early examples of the expression appeared in newspapers in Alabama or stories relating to Alabama, suggesting that it may have originated there, perhaps coined by Spangler himself. At the time, Alabama had recently enacted a new statewide prohibition law prohibiting the sale, but not the consumption of alcohol, making it necessary to bring one's own alcohol.

A variant of BYOB is BYOS, meaning "bring your own sugar". This was used in England and the United States amid wartime rationing during World War I and again in World War II.

Shortly after passage of the Eighteenth Amendment to the United States Constitution prohibiting the sale of alcohol nationwide, a joke about BYOL replacing RSVP on formal invitations began circulating in newspapers across the country. The joke appeared as early as June 1919 in the Des Moines (Iowa) Daily News, and was in wide circulation by the end of the year.

BYOB appeared occasionally during the 1920s, and when defined was usually rendered as "bring your own booze", although "beer", "bottle" and "beverage" were all suggested on at least one occasion. BYOL was the dominant form of the expression until the 1950s. But when BYOB became more popular in the 1950s, it was regularly defined as "bring your own bottle", frequently in circumstances involving restaurants without liquor licenses. "Bring your own beverage" was in common use by the 1970s and was in wide circulation by the end of the year.

In the 21st century, BYOF – "bring your own food" – appeared on the scene, referring to bars lacking full kitchens, encouraging patrons to bring their own food.

== Corkage ==
Establishments that sell alcoholic beverages for on-site consumption, such as bars or restaurants, may also allow patrons to bring their own alcohol. That alcohol is usually subject to an opening fee. Often the rule is limited to bottles of wine, where the fee is known as corkage or a corking fee. Such policies are greatly regulated by local liquor control laws and licensing restrictions.

== Bottle club ==
As an alternative to the traditional full-service liquor license, some jurisdictions, such as Florida and Delaware, offer a similar license known as a bottle club license. It allows the business establishment to serve alcohol on the premises, but only if patrons brought the alcohol from elsewhere. The license generally prohibits the business from selling its own stock of alcoholic beverages and may require that patrons be members of the establishment. Such licenses may be preferred in situations where fees or zoning conditions imposed by a full-service liquor license are unwanted or impractical. They may also be the only license available, as some jurisdictions, 18 states, impose full-service liquor license quotas or business class restrictions.

In the United States, no license is required for private clubs that do not sell alcohol but allow patrons to bring their own. As obtaining a license to serve alcohol is complicated and expensive, and laws about what may happen on the premises are sometimes quite restrictive, strip clubs and other establishments providing some sexually related service or environment often use a BYOB approach, sometimes announcing that they provide "mixers" (cocktail ingredients other than alcohol).

== Regional variations ==
In Australia and New Zealand, the term "BYO" (Bring Your Own) emerged to describe business establishments that offered corkage. It is believed that restaurants in Melbourne, in the state of Victoria, were advertising as "BYO" establishments by the 1960s with the concept becoming popular in New Zealand in the late 1970s.

In New Zealand if a premise only holds an on-licence-endorsed (BYOB license), an owner who is also a duty manager with a General Manager's Certificate is forbidden to have a wine list and sell alcohol on the premises. The owner must have both On-License & On-License-Endorsed to have a wine list and allow BYOB, thus calling the restaurant 'fully licensed'.

In Taiwan whisky served at banquets is often brought from home.

== See also ==
- List of restaurant terminology
- Bring your own device - derivative term
