= Red Arrow Diner =

Diner in New Hampshire

Coordinates: 42.993449°N 71.461400°W

- Industry: Diners
- Founded: 1922
- Founder: David Lamontagne
- Headquarters: Manchester, New Hampshire, United States
- Number of locations: 4
- Areas served: Manchester, Londonderry, Nashua, and Concord, New Hampshire
- Key people: George Lawrence (co-owner), Amanda Wihby (co-owner)
- Products: Burgers; sandwiches; steak; chicken; salads; breakfast food; soft drinks; desserts
- Website: www.redarrowdiner.com

The Red Arrow Diner is a 24-hour diner located in the state of New Hampshire in the United States. The diner currently has four locations, in Manchester, Concord, Londonderry, Nashua, and previously had a location in Milford. Media outlets have repeatedly rated the diner one of the best in the United States, and the diner became known as a recurrent stop for politicians on the New Hampshire primary campaign trail—one of the first in the nation—during presidential primary season.

== History ==
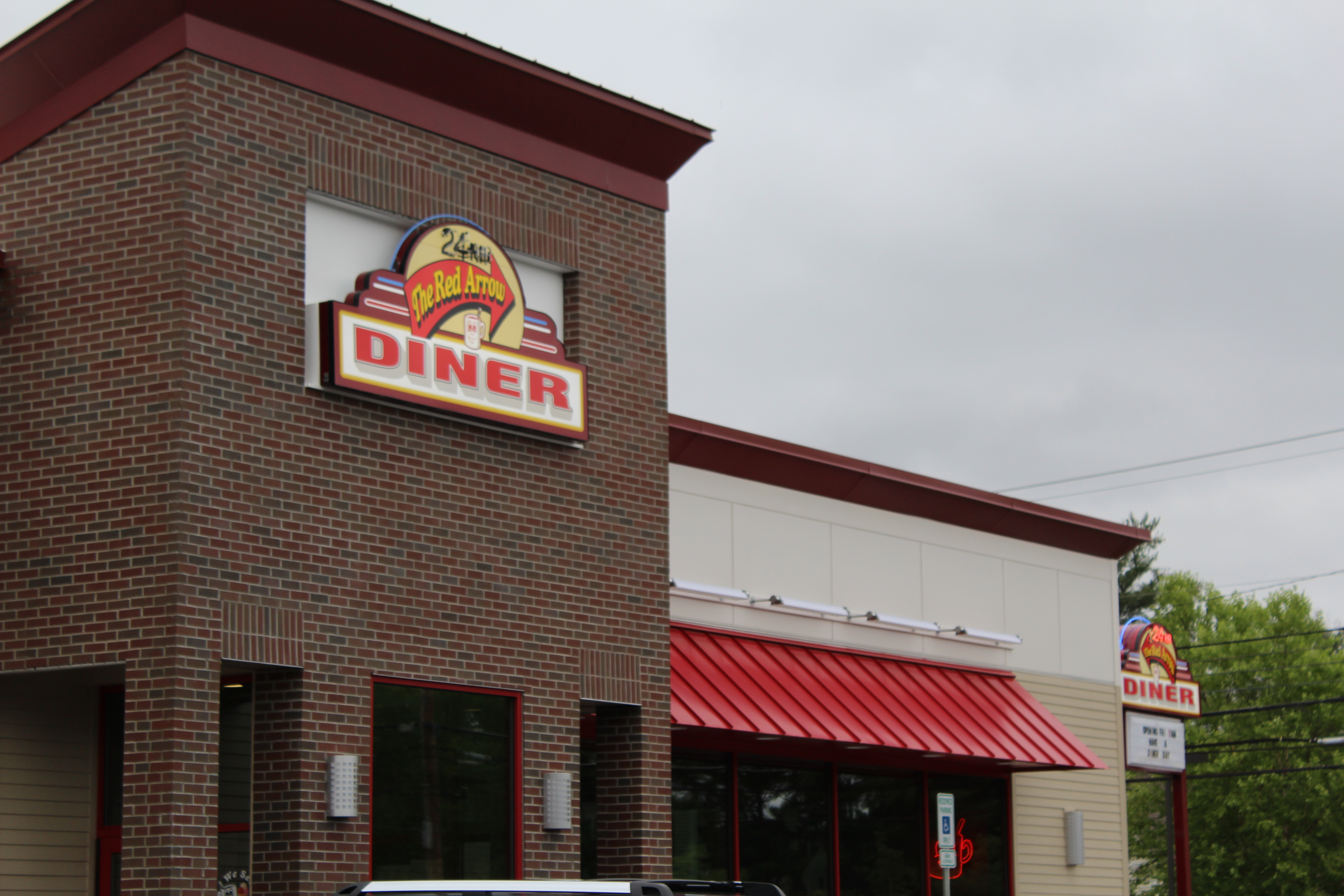
Red Arrow Diner in Concord

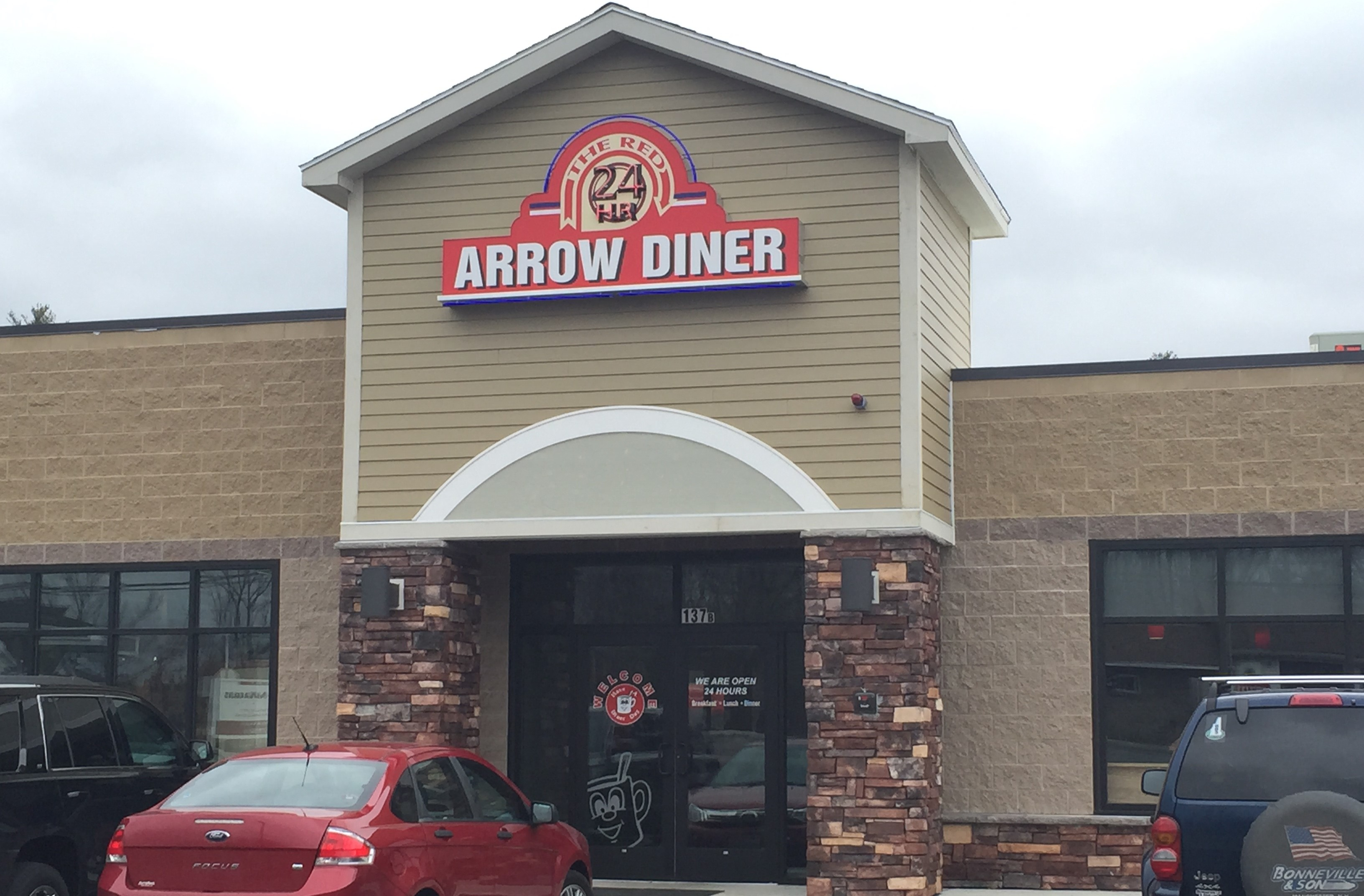
Red Arrow Diner in Londonderry

The first location, in Manchester, opened in 1922 and was founded by David Lamontagne, who was a boxer and iceman. It closed in 1985 and was bought and reopened in 1987 by Carol Lawrence, who remains its owner and president. Manchester designated the Red Arrow a city historic landmark in 2000. A Milford location opened in 2008, and a Londonderry location in 2015. The Concord location opened in 2017. The Milford location suddenly closed on December 1, 2019. On May 8, 2020, the diner opened a new location in Nashua, New Hampshire.

== Media attention ==
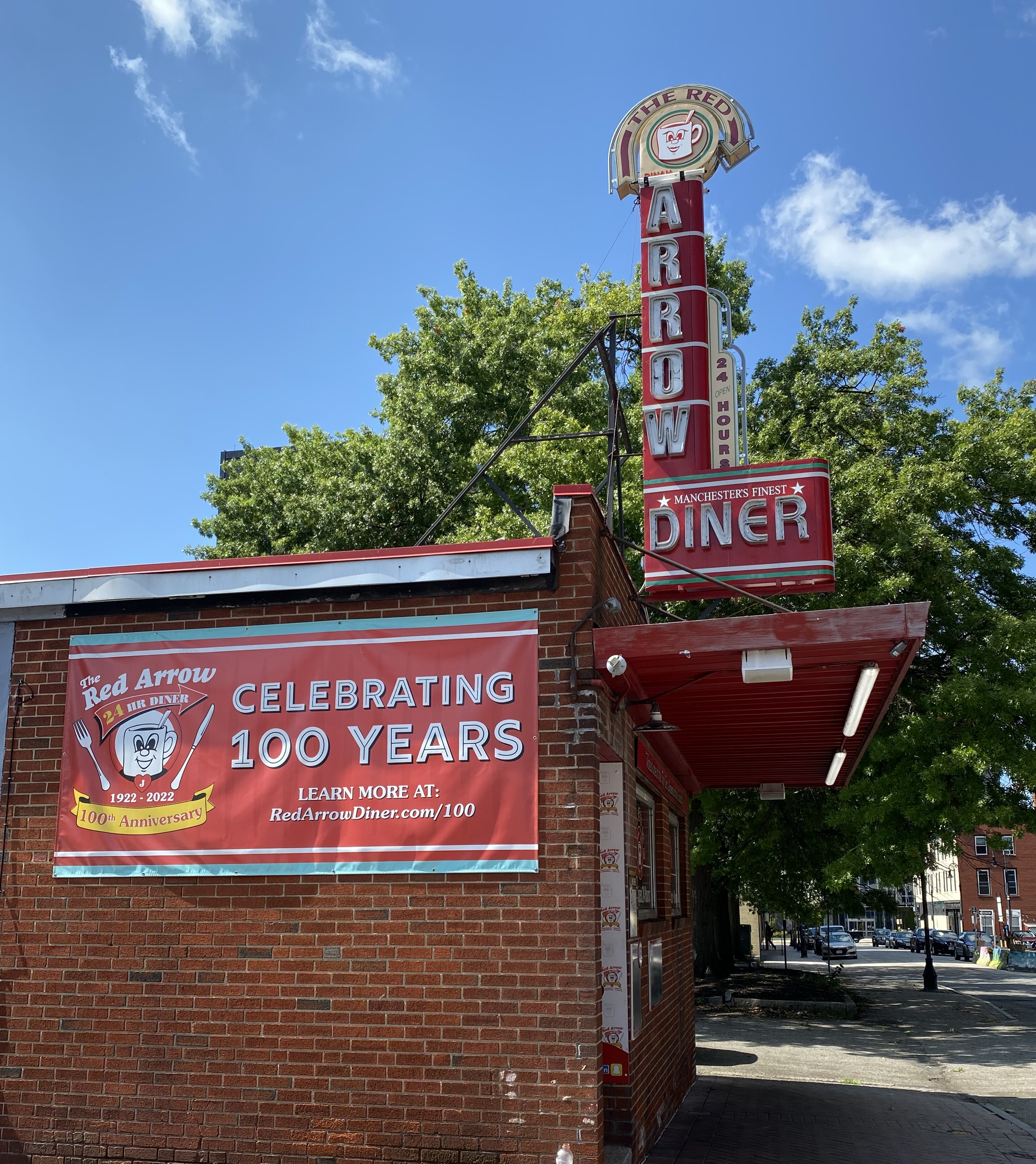
Red Arrow Diner in Manchester

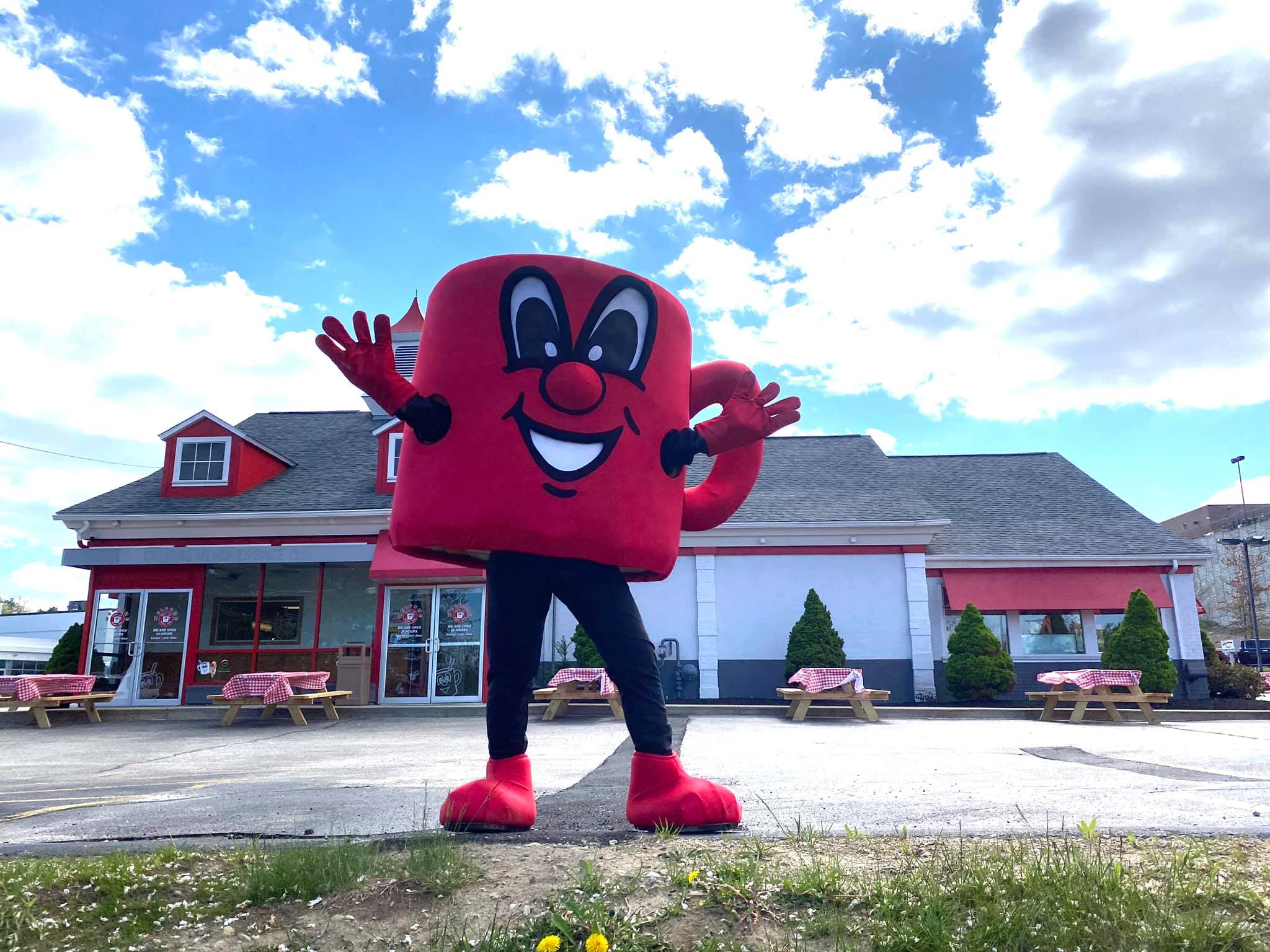
Red Arrow Diner in Nashua

News outlets and food journalists have rated the diner one of the best in the nation on several occasions. USA Today rated it one of the ten best diners in 1998. In 2014, Business Insider named it the best diner in New Hampshire. New England Today declared it one of the 15 best diners in New England in 2018, and also in 2018, The Daily Meal rated it the best 24-hour diner in America. In 2007, the Manchester location appeared in episode 7 of the first season of Diners, Drive-Ins, and Dives. In 2012, the diner was re-created in Massachusetts to be used for filming of the Adam Sandler film Grown Ups 2. In 2019, the Red Arrow Diner was used to frame a "Daily Double" question on Jeopardy!.

== Campaign stop ==
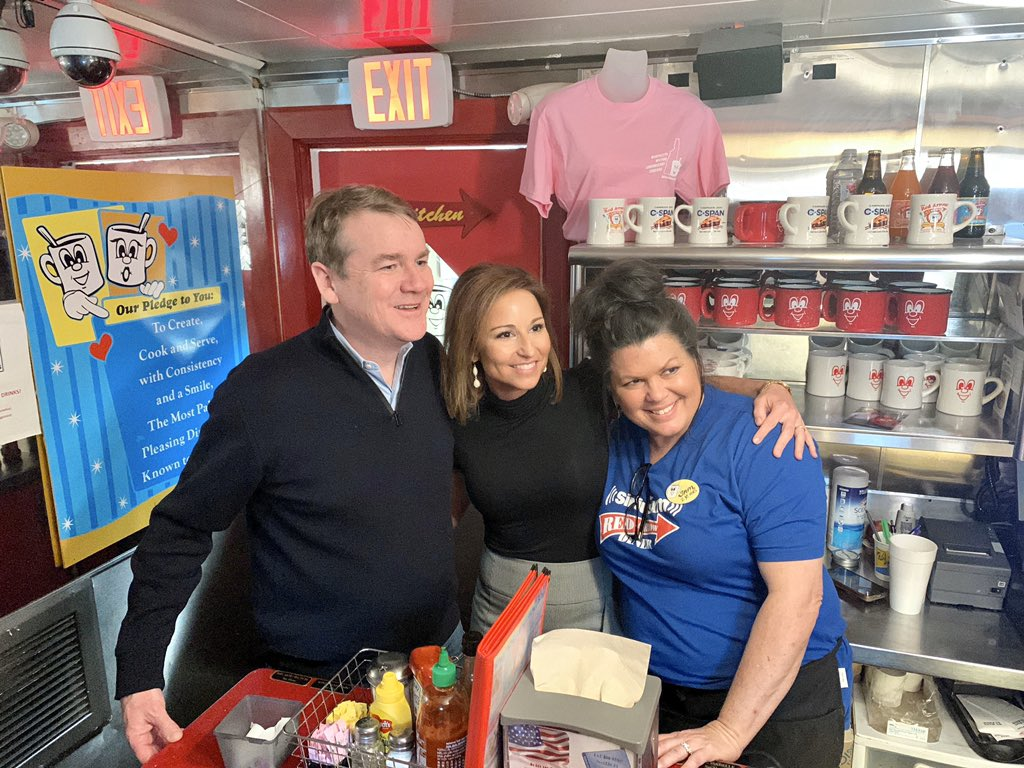
Presidential candidate Michael Bennet at the Red Arrow Diner in 2020

The restaurant became "a requisite stop for political candidates" campaigning in New Hampshire, in part because New Hampshire's presidential primary is held earlier than any presidential-election-related contest in the nation other than the Iowa Caucuses. In 2014, an Associated Press writer noted, "you really can't run for president without grabbing some grub at the Red Arrow Diner. Every four years during New Hampshire's first-in-the-nation presidential primary, pretty much every White House wannabe makes a pilgrimage to this tiny 100-year-old diner tucked onto a side street of the state's largest city." Eater attributed the Red Arrow's prominence to the influence of the 1992 Bill Clinton campaign, which prioritized diner visits as a means of outreach to rank-and-file voters; Al Gore's 2000 campaign took a similar tack, and "by the 2008 election cycle, it had become a must-stop for both Democrats and Republicans". The diner has a tradition of "de-virginizing" patrons who are visiting for the first time; in her 2008 campaign trail stop, Hillary Clinton's campaign asked that this tradition not be applied to her. NPR interviewed dinees at the Red Arrow the day after Donald Trump's 2016 presidential victory; Trump's visit to the diner on the campaign trail was marked by a citizen protest.
