= Meat and three =

Meal format in the southern United States

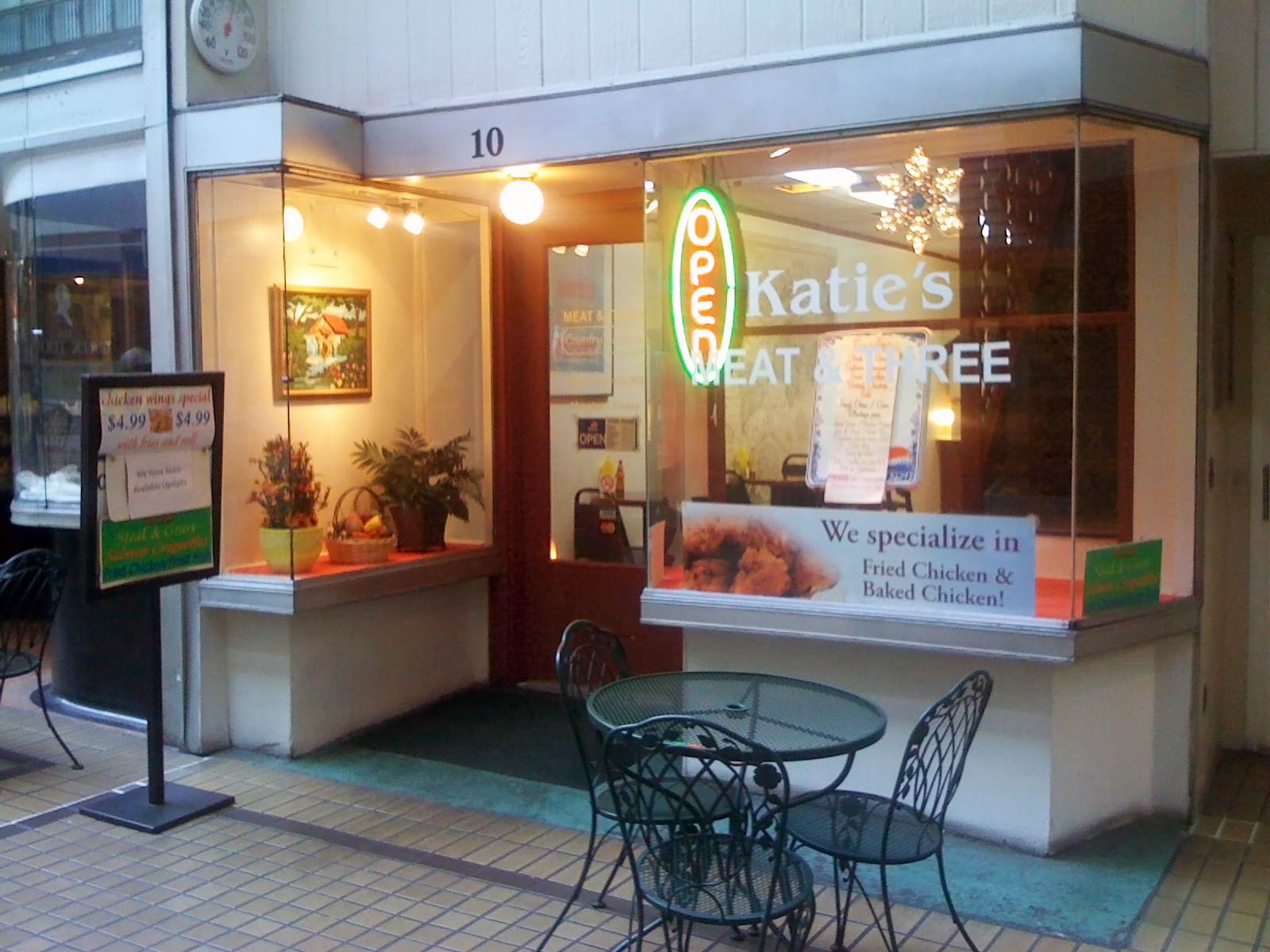
A meat and three restaurant in Nashville, Tennessee

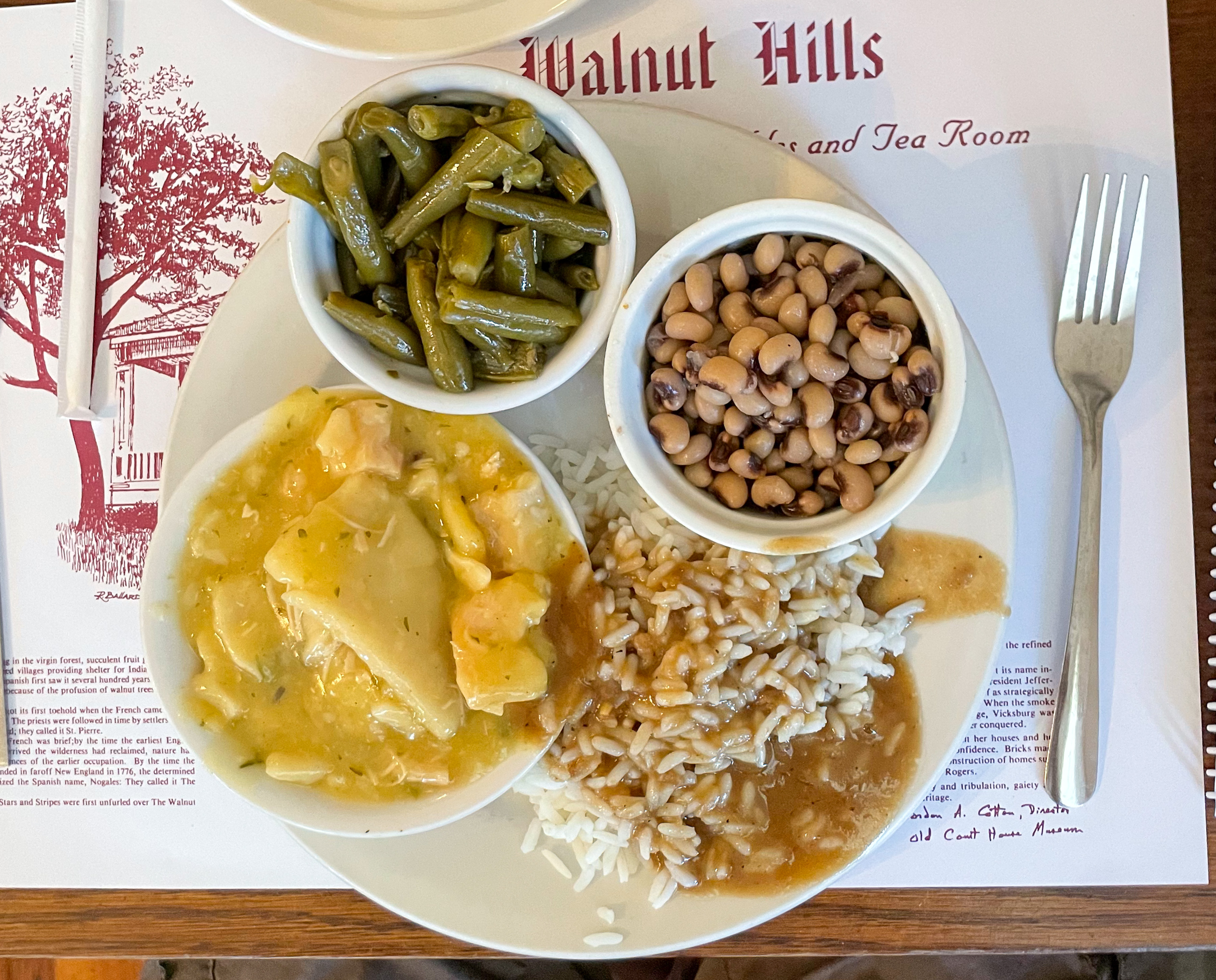
A plate of meat and three at Walnut Hills restaurant, Vicksburg, Mississippi

A meat and three is a meal where the customer picks one meat and three side dishes as a fixed-price offering. Meats commonly include fried chicken, country ham, beef, country-fried steak, meatloaf, or pork chop; and sides span from vegetables such as potatoes, corn, and green beans, to macaroni and cheese, hush puppies, and spaghetti. A dessert, such as gelatin, is often offered. Typical accompaniments include cornbread and sweet tea.

“Meat-and-three” is a regional term popular in the cuisine of the Southern United States for both the meal and restaurants offering such a menu. Variants of meat and three can be found throughout the United States, but its roots can be traced to Tennessee and its capital of Nashville. It is also associated with soul food.

Similar concepts include the Hawaiian plate lunch, which features a variety of entrée choices with fixed side items of white rice and macaroni salad, and the southern Louisiana plate lunch, which features menu options that change daily. It is somewhat similar to a blue-plate special but with a more fixed menu. Boston Market and Cracker Barrel chains of restaurants offer a similar style of food selection. Another similar dish is the Japanese bento box.

== See also ==
- List of restaurant terminology
