= Table sharing =

Seating separate groups at the same restaurant table

Table sharing is the practice of seating multiple separate parties (individual customers or groups of customers) who may not know each other at a single restaurant table.

== Overview ==
By practising table sharing, two (or more) groups of customers who may not know each other sit together at a table in a restaurant, and are able to get a table faster than waiting for the first group to finish. However, in many cultures, the act of sharing food with another person is a highly emotionally charged act; even in cultures which take a more casual attitude towards it, sharing a table with strangers in a restaurant can create some awkwardness.

== Diffusion ==
Table sharing is a common practice in busy restaurants in Japan. In Japanese culture, being invited to a person's home to share a meal is rather uncommon and indicates a close relationship. However, sharing a table in public with strangers is just a routine occurrence with no special meaning. It is an example of how Japanese concepts of personal space are adapted to crowded urban living conditions.

The custom of table sharing (Chinese: 搭枱) is also widespread in old-style yum cha Chinese restaurants, dai pai dongs and cha chaan tengs in Hong Kong, Taiwan, and parts of China. The Chinese restaurant process, referring to certain random processes in probability theory, is a mathematical allusion to this custom.

Harry G. Shaffer reported in the 1960s that it was a common practice in Soviet restaurants. He used the opportunity of being seated with strangers to strike up conversations with his fellow diners.

Table sharing is also practised in Germany, but mostly in informal or festive settings like in a beer hall, and rarely in restaurants.

Restaurants in Italy, unless very informal, do not usually practise table sharing. However sagre, popular festivals mostly involving food, and celebrations for local patron saints are very common throughout the country. In these occasions it is customary to share big tables in ample outdoor spaces.

== Business aspects ==
American business author Cheryl L. Russell points out that promoting sharing of tables can be an effective part of creating a friendly atmosphere in a restaurant, and would also enable the restaurant owner to free up a table for another party. However, a hospitality industry training guide from the same publisher recommends that waitstaff avoid seating strangers together unless crowded conditions demand it. The authors suggest one way of bringing up the topic is to explain to the guest the length of the wait for a private table, and then to suggest sharing a table with a stranger. They also advise against seating a man at a table where a woman is dining alone, or vice versa. In South Korea, McDonald's found that customers would leave more quickly if they were seated next to strangers, thus effectively increasing the restaurant's capacity.

== Etiquette ==
In Japan, diners who are strangers to each other will generally be seated together only by their mutual consent. In Canada, advice columnist Mary Beeckman pointed out in 1948 that the head waiter would generally ask a patron before seating a stranger at his or her table, but that refusal to do so would be regarded as "stuffy and selfish". South Korean McDonald's customers tended to feel awkward asking for permission to sit at a stranger's table, and were more comfortable being conducted to a seat by an employee. Being asked by the waiter to share a table may or not may be a function of party size. For example, in restaurants with tables seating four to six people, a party of two or three may be requested to share a table, as one author pointed out in the context of Belarusian etiquette.

Japanese etiquette does not require that one converse with the unknown party with whom one is seated. In the United States, Emily Post advised that it was not necessary to say anything to a stranger with whom one shared a table, not even a "good-bye" when leaving the table. However she pointed out that one would of course naturally say good-bye if there had otherwise been previous conversation during the course of the meal. Similarly, Mary Beeckman advised that the safest rule was not to try to start a conversation when sharing a table with strangers. A travel guide to Germany advises that one would generally say Mahlzeit (literally "mealtime," idiomatically equivalent to "bon appétit" or "Enjoy your meal") and goodbye, but that no other small talk would be required. In contrast, in some African cultures, it is considered impolite to share a table with strangers without exchanging some words.

== See also ==
- List of restaurant terminology
- Chinese restaurant process
