= 86 (term) =

American English slang term

Eighty-six or 86 is American English slang term originating in the hospitality industry, especially food or drinks establishments, meaning that an item is no longer available, or that a person is not welcome on the premises. Its etymology is unknown, but it seems to have been coined in the 1920s or 1930s.

== Etymology ==
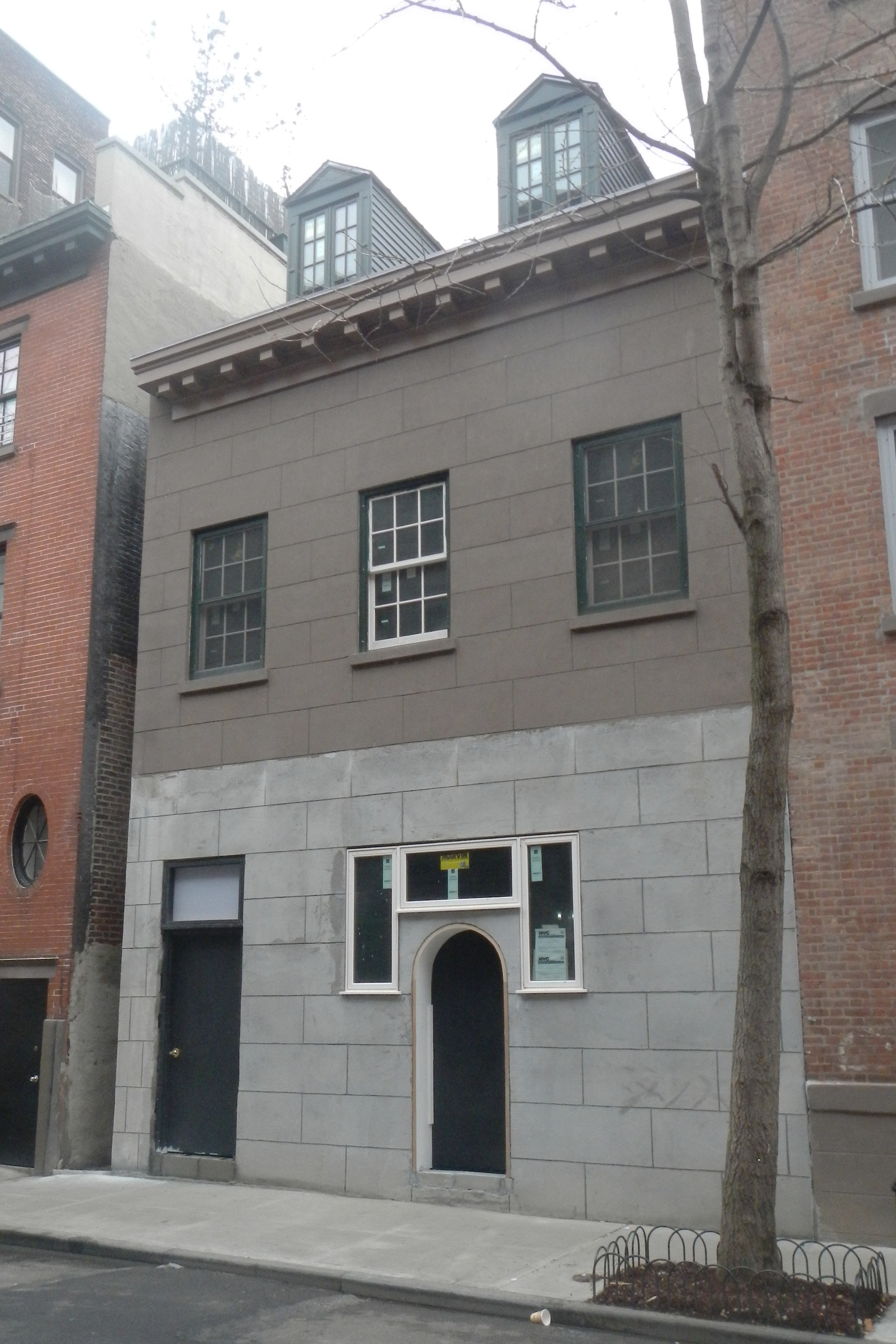
The address of Chumley's—86 Bedford Street, West Village—is one of several origin stories of the term

A 2019 article in St Louis Magazine quips that there are "about 86 theories" explaining the term's origin and lists eighteen. Possible origins include:

- Rhyming slang for nix. The fact-checking website Snopes posits that the most likely derivation is from the slang "nix," which "carries a clear meaning of 'say no to, turn down, forbid,' which is the primary meaning ascribed to 86".
- Part of the jargon used by soda jerks. Walter Winchell wrote about this in 1933, in his syndicated On Broadway column. In this, the code 13 meant that a boss was around, 81 was a glass of water and 86 meant "all out of it". In 1936, Professor Harold Bentley of Columbia University studied soda jerk jargon and reported other numeric codes such as 95 for a customer leaving without paying.
- The author Jef Klein theorized that the bar Chumley's at 86 Bedford Street in the West Village in Lower Manhattan was the source. Chumley's had multiple entrances on different streets, and Klein's book The History and Stories of the Best Bars of New York claims that, during Prohibition, the police would call the bar before making a raid and tell the bartender to "86" his customers. This meant that they should exit out the 86 Bedford Street door, while the police would come to the Pamela Court entrance.
- Article 86 of the Uniform Code of Military Justice defines the offense of absence without leave.

== Usage ==
Eighty-six is used in restaurants and bars, according to most American slang dictionaries. It is often used in food and drink services to indicate that an item is no longer available or that a customer should be ejected. Beyond this context, it generally means to get rid of someone or something.

The Merriam-Webster dictionary defines the term as to "refuse to serve (a customer)", or to "get rid of" or "throw out" someone or something. The Oxford English Dictionary (OED) says it may be used as a noun or verb. As a noun, "In restaurants and bars, an expression indicating that the supply of an item is exhausted, or that a customer is not to be served; also, a customer to be refused service. Also transferred." As a transitive verb derived from the noun, it means "to eject or debar (a person) from premises; to reject or abandon". The OED gives examples of usage from 1933 to 1981; for example, in the 1972 film The Candidate, a media adviser says to Robert Redford's character, "OK, now, for starters, we got to cut your hair and eighty-six the sideburns".

According to Cassell's Dictionary of Slang, "to 86" can alternatively mean "to kill, to murder; to execute judicially". Other slang dictionaries, starting in 1971, also contain this definition.

== In popular culture ==
The term 86 is prominent in the light novel series 86 and its subsequent anime adaptation. In the world of the series, the main setting of the Republic of San Magnolia is divided into 86 districts, with the 86th housing all of the country's minority populations that are collectively given the pejorative "86", meaning that they were discarded by society.

=== Music ===
- The 1947 song "Boogie Woogie Blue Plate", by Louis Jordan and his Tympany Five, uses soda-jerk lingo, among which is "86 on the cherry pie".
- The narrator of the 1975 song "Eggs and Sausage" by Tom Waits says, "I've been 86ed from your scheme" .
- The song "86" by Green Day on their 1995 album Insomniac is about them being rejected from their punk rock community when they started achieving commercial success.
- The song "The Remedy" by Puscifer on their 2015 album Money Shot contains the lyrics "Trolls receive 86s".
- The song "Cliches" by Jimmy Buffett, includes the line: "She's eighty-sixed from the chartroom..." suggesting that the woman in the song was no longer allowed in the local Key West bar frequented by Buffett “The Chartroom.”

=== Stage and screen ===
- Agent 86 in the 1960s TV show Get Smart gets his code number from the term.
- Character Sherlock Holmes, in Season 3, Episode 4 of Elementary (originally broadcast in 2015) explains a suspect has used a secret tunnel from Chumley's to 86.
- The 2018 comedy crime film 86'd by Alan Palomo depicts five stories taking place at a 24-hour deli.

=== Literature ===
- The 1989 novel Eighty-sixed by David B. Feinberg refers to "the gay community wiped out by AIDS". It won Feinberg the Lambda Literary Award for Gay Men's Fiction and the American Library Association Gay/Lesbian Award for Fiction.
- The 2009 novel 86'd by Dan Fante is loosely based on his own struggles with alcoholism and substance abuse.

=== United States politics ===
In 1986, California voters removed the state's Supreme Court Chief Justice Rose Bird, along with Justices Cruz Reynoso and Joseph Grodin. Campaign buttons included slogans such as "86 the Bird."

In 1996, The Nation dismissed the Bill Clinton administration's firing of travel office employees by writing, "assume that Hillary [Clinton] personally eighty-sixed seven travel office employees ... AT&T fired 44,000 and nobody said a word."

8664 was a freeway removal advocacy group in Louisville, Kentucky, who in the early 2000s advocated for the removal of Interstate 64 along Louisville's riverfront.

A 2017 TMZ article described then President Donald Trump as having "86'd Black History Month." In 2018, a restaurant owner asked then White House press secretary Sarah Huckabee Sanders to leave, and later described the request as "I'd 86'd Sanders."

In October of 2020, Michigan governor Gretchen Whitmer appeared from her home on the television show Meet the Press, displaying a small pin in the background featuring the numbers "86 45". Many on the right and in the administration of the 45th president, Donald Trump, claimed it was a reference to assassination, though there is no evidence the incident was investigated by the Justice Department.

In 2022, alt-right conspiracy theorist Jack Posobiec tweeted "8646", and also used it as a code for merchandise calling for then-president Joe Biden's impeachment. The sale of T shirts, hats and stickers with "86 46" was widespread during the Biden presidency.

In a February 2024 tweet, Matt Gaetz, then member of the U.S. House of Representatives from Florida's 1st congressional district, wrote that House speaker Kevin McCarthy, Republican National Committee chairwoman Ronna McDaniel, and Senator Mitch McConnell had been "86'd" from their leadership positions.

==== 86 47 ====
Former FBI director James Comey, who had previously criticized Trump, was indicted in April 2026 for, the government argued, using the term "86 47" on social media to incite violence against Trump, who had been reelected as the 47th president. Later that year, the second Trump administration attempted to force a number of anti-Trump protesters not to show the symbol in Washington, D.C. In June, a federal judge found that displays of the sign were protected by the First Amendment to the United States Constitution. Later that month, the phrase "86 47" was imprinted on the National Mall's grass.

== See also ==
- 23 skidoo
- Deep six
- Diner lingo
