= Blue-plate special =

North American term for low-cost meal

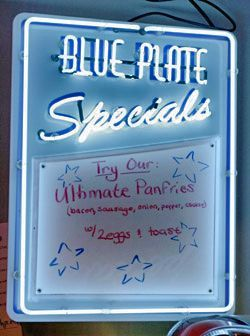
A typical blue-plate special board, from the Red Arrow Diner in Manchester, New Hampshire

A blue-plate special is a discount-priced meal that changes daily. The practice was common from the 1920s in American and Canadian restaurants through the 1950s, especially in diners and greasy spoons. As of 2026, there are still a few restaurants and diners that offer blue-plate specials under that name, sometimes on blue plates, but it is a vanishing tradition.

A collection of 1930s prose gives this definition: "A Blue Plate Special is a low-priced daily diner special — a main course with all the fixins, a daily combo, a square for two bits."

== History ==
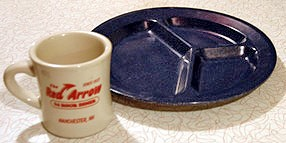
Some blue-plate specials are served on divided plates.

The origin and explanation of the phrase are unclear.

Etymologist Michael Quinion cites a dictionary entry indicating that the blue plates were, more specifically, inexpensive divided plates that were decorated with a "blue willow" or similar blue pattern, such as those popularized by the more expensive Spode and Wedgwood. One of his correspondents says that the first known use of the term is on an October 22, 1892, Fred Harvey Company restaurant menu and implies that blue-plate specials were regular features at Harvey Houses in the late 19th century. Alternatively, Kevin Reed says that "during the Depression, a manufacturer started making plates with separate sections for each part of a meal — like a TV dinner tray — it seems that for whatever reason they were only available in the color blue".

The term became common starting in the late 1920s. A May 27, 1926 advertisement in The New York Times for "The Famous Old Sea Grill Lobster and Chop House" at 141 West 45th Street promised "A La Carte All Hours", "Moderate Prices", and "Blue Plate Specials". A December 2, 1928 article, lamenting the rise in prices that had made it difficult to "dine on a dime", praised an Ann Street establishment where one could still get "a steak-and-lots-of-onion sandwich for a dime" and a "big blue-plate special, with meat course and three vegetables, is purchasable for a quarter, just as it has been for the last ten years". The first book publication of Damon Runyon's story "Little Miss Marker" was in a 1934 collection titled Damon Runyon's Blue Plate Special. A Hollywood columnist wrote in 1940: "Every time Spencer Tracy enters the Metro commissary, executives and minor geniuses look up from their blue plate specials to look at the actor and marvel."

"No substitutions" was a common policy on blue-plate specials. One 1947 Candid Microphone episode features Allen Funt ordering a blue-plate special and trying to talk the waiter into making various changes, such as replacing the vegetable soup with consommé, while the polite but increasingly annoyed waiter tries in vain to explain to Funt that "no substitutions" means what it says. In Five Easy Pieces (1970), the Jack Nicholson character, Bobby Dupea, gets into an argument with the waitress about the “no substitutions” policy. Our Man in Havana (1958) by Graham Greene has the following exchange regarding an "American blue-plate lunch":

"Surely you know what a blue-plate is, man? They shove the whole meal at you under your nose, already dished up on your plate – roast turkey, cranberry sauce, sausages and carrots and French fried. I can't bear French fried but there's no pick and choose with a blue-plate."

"No pick and choose?"

"You eat what you're given. That's democracy, man."

== Contemporary usage ==
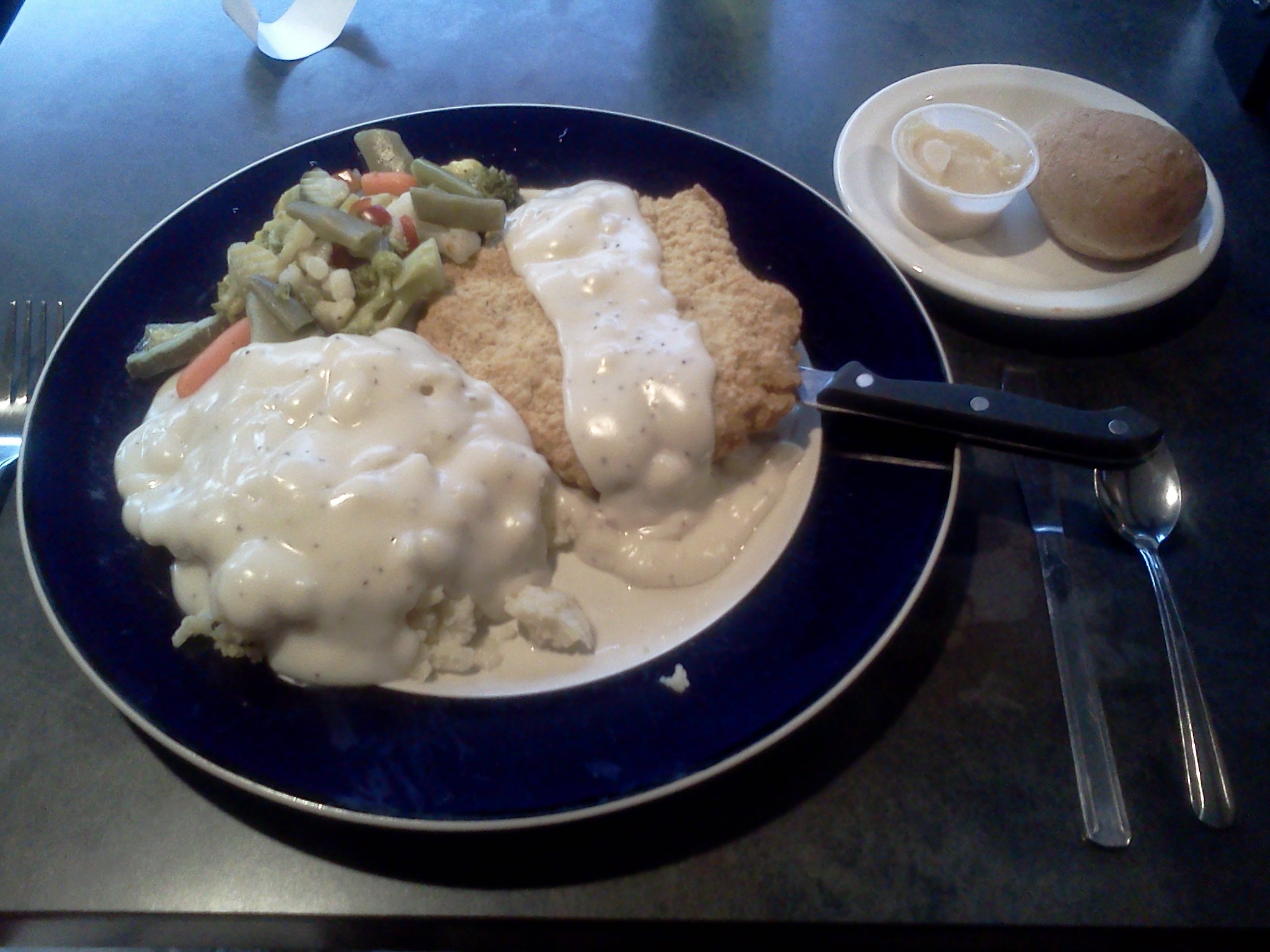
Blue-plate special in Mullan, Idaho

In contemporary usage, a "blue-plate special" can be any inexpensive full meal, a daily special, or merely a whimsical phrase for a home meal composed of odds and ends or leftovers.

=== In film and television ===
In the 1973 film The Sting, Robert Redford's character Johnny "Kelly" Hooker orders the blue-plate special at the diner. In the 1974 film The Front Page, condemned killer Earl Williams is said to be getting a "95-cent blue plate special from the greasy spoon across the street" for his last meal. In the 1997 movie Good Will Hunting, Matt Damon's character references a "blue plate special" in one of the movie's more memorable monologues when explaining why he does not wish to work for the government. In the television series Double Dare, one obstacle on the final course is called the Blue Plate Special. In The Devil All The Time (Netflix), Willard is offered the meatloaf "blue plate special" by the waitress in the Wooden Spoon Diner in Meade, Ohio; he opts instead for coffee and a doughnut. In the third-season episode of The X-Files, "Piper Maru", Skinner orders a “blue plate special” in a diner, just before getting shot.

=== In print ===
In Graham Greene's Our Man in Havana (first published in 1958), the protagonist, Mr. Wormold, is almost poisoned by a rival while eating a blue-plate lunch at a meeting of the European Traders' Association.

In the Blondie comic strip for July 8, 1964, Dagwood is curious about the blue plate special being served on a white plate, and the explanation is that it's named after the cook, Oscar Blueplate.

Richard Bernstein titled his New York Times review of Andrew Hurley's book Diners, Bowling Alleys, and Trailer Parks (2001), "The Red, White and Blue Plate Special".

Road food experts Jane and Michael Stern titled their guidebook Blue Plate Specials and Blue Ribbon Chefs: The Heart And Soul of America's Great Roadside Restaurants (2001).

== See also ==
- Blue light special
- List of restaurant terminology
