= Manipuri cuisine =

Cuisine of Manipur, a state of northeastern India

Manipuri cuisine refers to the cuisine of Manipur, a state of northeastern India. Daily meals are based on rice, with a few side dishes of vegetables, fish and meat. A meal would usually have a vegetable stew called ensaang or athongba, flavored with dried or fried fish; stir-fried vegetables called kanghou; and a spicy item, which could be morok metpa (a chili paste), eromba (boiled and mashed vegetables with chili and fermented fish), or singju (a piquant salad). All piquant side dishes are accompanied by a choice of fresh herbs, collectively called maroi. The base and essence of both Meitei Manipuri and non-Meitei (such as Naga and Kuki) Manipuri cuisine is the fermented fish called ngari. Several dishes of meat, mostly chicken and pork, are cooked with unique recipes. Due to religious taboos, Muslims living in Manipur do not cook pork.

A side dish of steamed (a-ngaanba) or boiled vegetables with a hint of sugar (cham-phut) is also quite common as palate cleansers in most meals. The aromatics of most dishes start with frying bay leaf, chives, onion, garlic, and ginger in mustard oil. The rest of the vegetables follow after that. Oil is sparingly used in most of the main stews ,but the side dishes of kanghou (stir-fried spicy vegetables) and bora (fritters) make up for that. Fish is also a staple,and appears in every meal, either as ngaari or as roasted or fried pieces. While fish is an essential part of the diet, due to increasing prices, fish curry is prepared only occasionally, or during feasts. The Meiteis live in the valley of Manipur ,where freshwater fish from lakes , rivers,and ponds had been plentiful until recent times. In Manipur, meals are known as chakluk.

Non-Meitei cuisine can be found in the hills of the state.

== Basic diet ==
The staple diet of Manipur consists of rice, fish, and large varieties of leafy vegetables (both aquatic and terrestrial). Manipuris typically raise vegetables in a kitchen garden and rear fishes in small ponds (pukhri) around their house. Since the vegetables are either grown at home or obtained from local market, the cuisines are very seasonal, each season having its own special vegetables and preparations. The taste is very different from other Indian cuisines because of the use of various aromatic herbs and roots that are peculiar to the region.

=== Aromatic herbs and roots used by Meiteis and non-Meiteis ===
1. Nungshi hidak (Mint)
2. Maroi napaakpi (Hooker chives)
3. Yenam (maroi nakuppi) (Chinese chives)
4. Awaa phadigom (Mexican coriander)
5. Mayang-ton (Lemon basil)
6. Toning-khok (Chameleon plant)
7. Khanghuman/Kanghu-maan (Salvia dianthera, formerly Meriandra dianthera and Meriandra bengalensis)
8. Mukthrubi (Zanthoxylum armatum) (Sichuan peppercorn)
9. Phakpai (Vietnamese coriander)
10. Chantruk (pepper cress)
11. Yaipan (Curcuma angustifolia)
12. Kang-hu mapaan (galangal)
13. Takhel-manao
14. Leibakmaroom (Calvatia gigantea)
15. Uyen (similar to shiitake mushroom)
16. Uchi-na (jelly ear)
17. Chengum (mushroom)
18. Charu-yen (Volvariella volvacea)
19. Kanglayen (split gill mushroom)
20. Ushoi (bamboo shoots)

There are also ingredients in the cuisine that require an acquired taste, such as hawaijaar (fermented soya bean, somewhat similar to the Japanese nattō), soibum (fermented bamboo shoot), ngaa-ri (fermented fish), and hentak (fermented fish powder and herbs).

=== Meats and seafood used by Meiteis and non-Meiteis ===
- Hameng (mutton)
- Khajing (shrimp)
- Nga (fish)
- Nganu (duck)
- Oak (pork)
- San (beef or buffalo)
- Tharoi (snail)
- Yen (chicken)

== Dishes ==
=== Meitei dishes ===
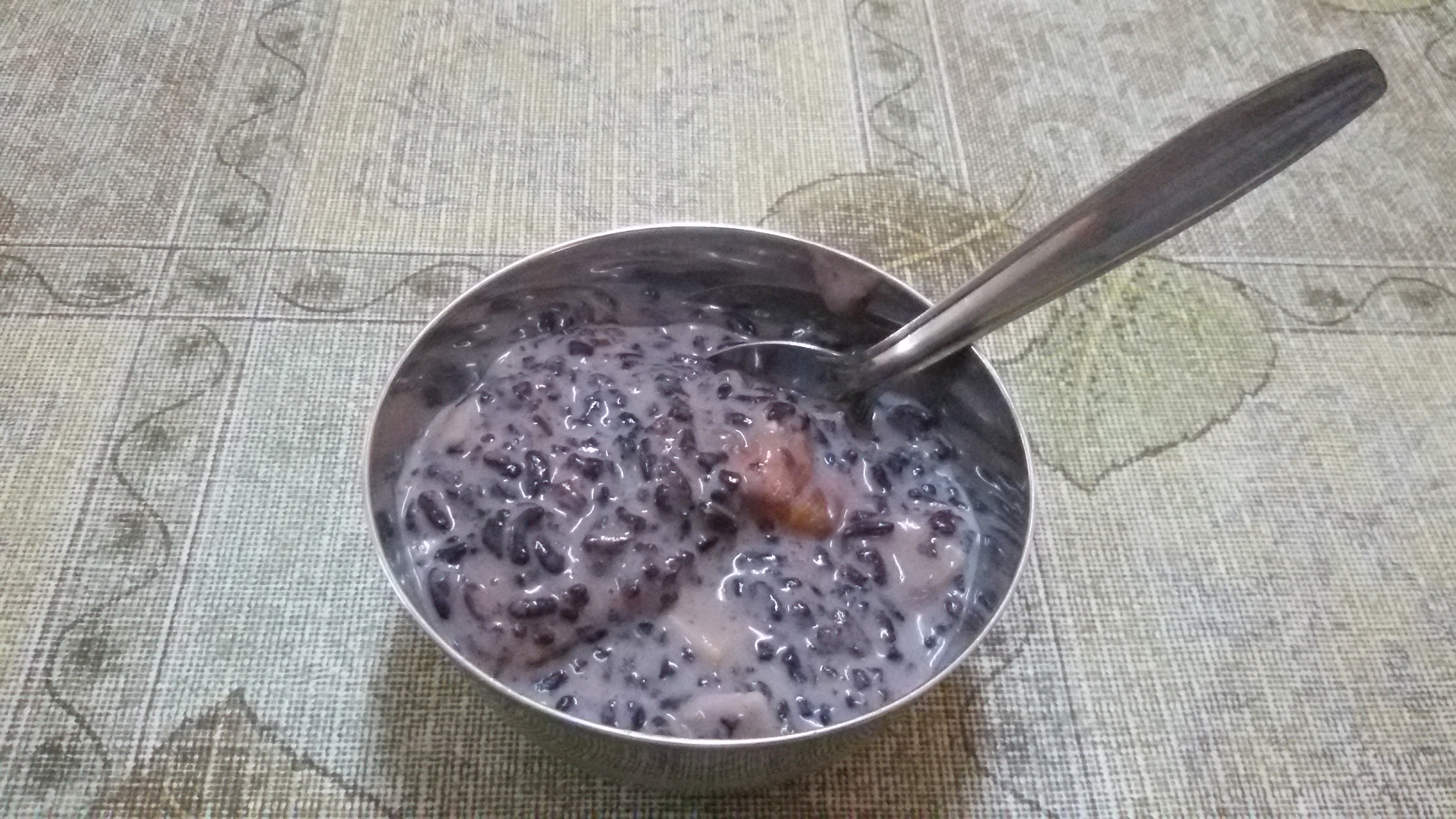
Chakhao kheer, a popular black rice dessert of Manipur made with Chak-Hao black rice

- Eromba: a chutney of vegetables boiled or steamed with a lot of red chillies or umorok (king chilli) with ngari (fermented fish), smoked or roasted fish, and mashed together. It is garnished with herbs like maroi (maroi nakuppi, phakpai, mayang-ton, toning-khok, kaanghumaan, lomba, tilhou, chaantruk, coriander leaves and many more).
- Singju: a piquant salad which is prepared with an assortment of raw vegetable, and can have varying combinations depending on preference or season. The vegetables are julienned, while the accompanying herbs and leaves are coarsely chopped or shredded. Some of the usual main ingredients are cabbage, lotus stem, laphu tharo (banana flower), komprek (a kind of scented herb), kollamni (another herb),and yongchaak (tree beans/stink beans/Parkia speciosa). The accompanying herbs and leaves include sweet pea shoots, toningkhok (Houtuniya cordata) leaves and roots, heibi mana, coriander leave,s etc. Most singju items are seasonal. Singju can be seasoned with a chili paste flavored with roasted ngari (fermented fish, or with roasted "thoiding" seeds (Perilla frutescens) powder and roasted chic pea powder/roasted besan, plus roasted red chili powder. Thoiding seeds are rich in healthy fats and vitamins, and when they are roaste,d they give a nutty flavor that is distinctive to a singju. Other additional ingredients include boiled beans and peas, and also savory crispies, though these are optional.
- Chamthong or kangshoi: a stew of any seasonal vegetables with coarsely chopped onions or spring onion, maroi - both yennam nakuppi and napakpi, ginger, ngari, and salt, topped with ngari, dried fish, or fried fish pieces and water. It is soupy in consistency and is eaten with rice.
- Morok metpa: a coarse paste prepared with green or dry red chilies mixed with chopped onions, coriander leaves and other local herbs for garnishing. The chilies are steamed or roasted with ngari or simply crushed and then mashed with salt and this fish condiment; fried fish pieces can also be added to it. This is something which accompanies both meals as a routine side dish.
- Kang-ngou or kaang-hou: various vegetables stir-fried with traditional spices
- Nganam: fish and maroi baked on a pan
- Paaknam: a pancake prepared with a mixture of pea flour, maroi napaakpi, laphu tharo, awa phadigom, and ngari wrapped in turmeric and banana leaves and either baked in a pan or steamed first and then roasted
- Nga thongba: a fish curry
- Nga ataoba thongba: a fried fish curry
- Nga atoiba: mashed fish
- Ooti: a typical vegetarian dish generally characterised by its slightly overcooked texture of having the ingredients slightly mashed. Baking soda is also frequently used for this dish.
- Pakoura thongba or bora thongba: a fritter curry
- Chagem pomba: a curry made with fermented soya, mustard leaves, roasted or smoked fish and other herbs; broken rice is also a main ingredient and so the name "chagem" in this dish
- Keli chana: a spicy chickpea snack
- Alu kangmet: boiled potatoes mashed with fried red chili and nakuppi with salt and/or dressed with mustard oil
- Sana thongba: a curry prepared with paneer
- Yen thongba: a chicken curry
- Nganu thongba: a duck curry
- Oak thongba: a pork curry
- San thongba: a beef curry
- Hameng thongba: a mutton curry
- Tharoi thongba: a snail curry
- Pan hawaijar thongba: a taro and fermented soybean curry
- Soibum thongba: a bamboo shoot curry
- Sagol hawai thongba: a black lentil curry
- A-nganba or champhut: steamed vegetables, such as pumpkin, peas, carrots, French beans, etc.
- Chak-hao kheer : a black rice pudding
- Tilhou kheer: an onion pudding
- Chemmeen kheer: a prawn pudding
- Sangom kheer: a white rice pudding
- Kabok: A puffed rice snack
- Hei thongba: a fruit curry
- Kangshubi: a ground seed snack
- Yerum tal: an omelette

=== Naga dishes ===
- Galho: a mixture of rice, vegetables and various meats

=== Kuki dishes ===
- Bai: combination of several herbs cooked with string beans and edible ferns
- Sanpiau: Rice porridge mixed with meat, sauce and spices
- Zû: a rice beer

== See also ==
- Burmese cuisine
