= Ngari (fish) =

Fermented fish product from Manipur

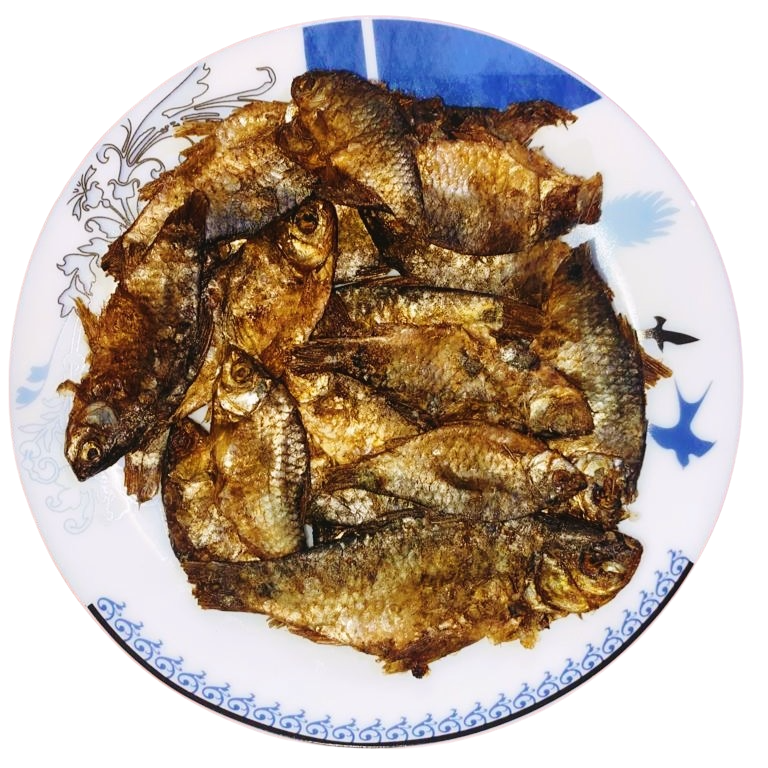
Ngari, a fermented fish product from Manipur and Nagaland

Ngari is a fermented fish product indigenous to the people of Manipur and Nagaland. Nga means fish in Meitei language and ri (riba/liba) means the process of fermentation. It is used as a condiment in Manipuri dishes like eromba, singju, kangshoi, morok metpa, and others.

Ngari is also consumed in other southwest states of India.

== Preparation and nutritional value ==
Ngari is made from small sun-dried pool barbs (Puntius sophore) locally known as phouba nga, which are 5-10 cm long. Traditionally, the fish is packed tightly in an earthen pot called ngari chaphou or kharung with a small amount of vegetable oil. The pot is then sealed with a fish paste, leaves, and mud and kept for fermentation at room temperature for about six months. Each of these pots can hold up to 15-75 kg of fish.

It has a high source of protein, vitamins, and essential amino acids and fatty acids. It also aids in digestion and has pharmacological benefits.

== Production ==
There are families in Manipur who have been in the business of making ngari for generations.

Nowadays, there are multiple commercial units in the business of ngari production in Manipur. The government licenses these units and they need to comply with the rules of the Food Safety and Standard Act, 2006.

== Concerns ==
A 2015 study reported that the population of phabou nga has been rapidly declining due to rising commercial activity around the production of ngari, and increasing pollution in and around the Loktak Lake. Adulteration in the production process by adding chemicals such as urea to speed up the fermentation has been reported.

== In popular culture ==
Olympic medallist Mary Kom said that ngari was one of the fermented fish varieties her family frequently eats.

== See also ==
- Manipuri cuisine
- Naga cuisine
