= Titsal Wood, Shadingfield =

Protected area in Suffolk, England

Coordinates: 52.4°N 1.564°E

- Site of Special Scientific Interest
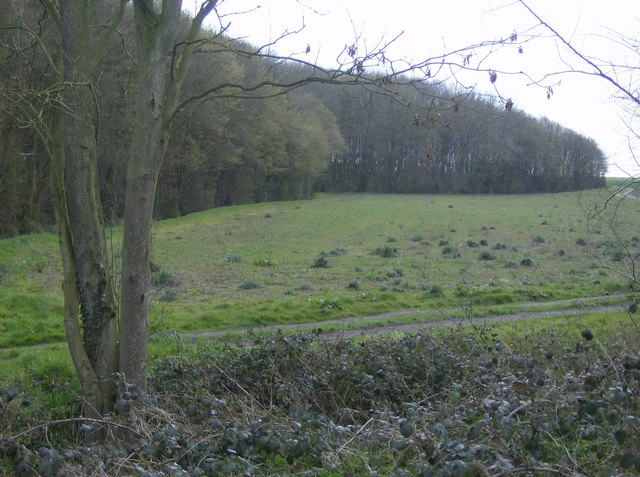
- Location of Titsal Wood, Shadingfield.
- Area of search: Suffolk
- Grid reference: TM 426 836
- Interest: Biological
- Area: 14.7 hectares
- Notification date: 1985
- Location map: Magic Map

Titsal Wood, Shadingfield is a 14.7-hectare (36-acre) biological Site of Special Scientific Interest south-west of Shadingfield in Suffolk.

This ancient coppice with standards wood is mainly hornbeam, but it also has young oak and ash standards. The ground flora is rich and ancient, including common spotted orchid, wood bitter-cress and the rare thin-spiked wood sedge.

The site is private land with no public access.
