= Rice and three =

Indian-style meal

In Indian cuisine, a rice and three restaurant is one where the customer picks three curries from a selection, which are served over rice. The concept is derived from the thali style of service.

The concept was claimed to have been created by the This and That restaurant in the Northern Quarter, Greater Manchester during the 1980s.

== See also ==
- List of restaurant terminology
- Meat and three
