= Singju =

Vegetable dish from Manipur, India

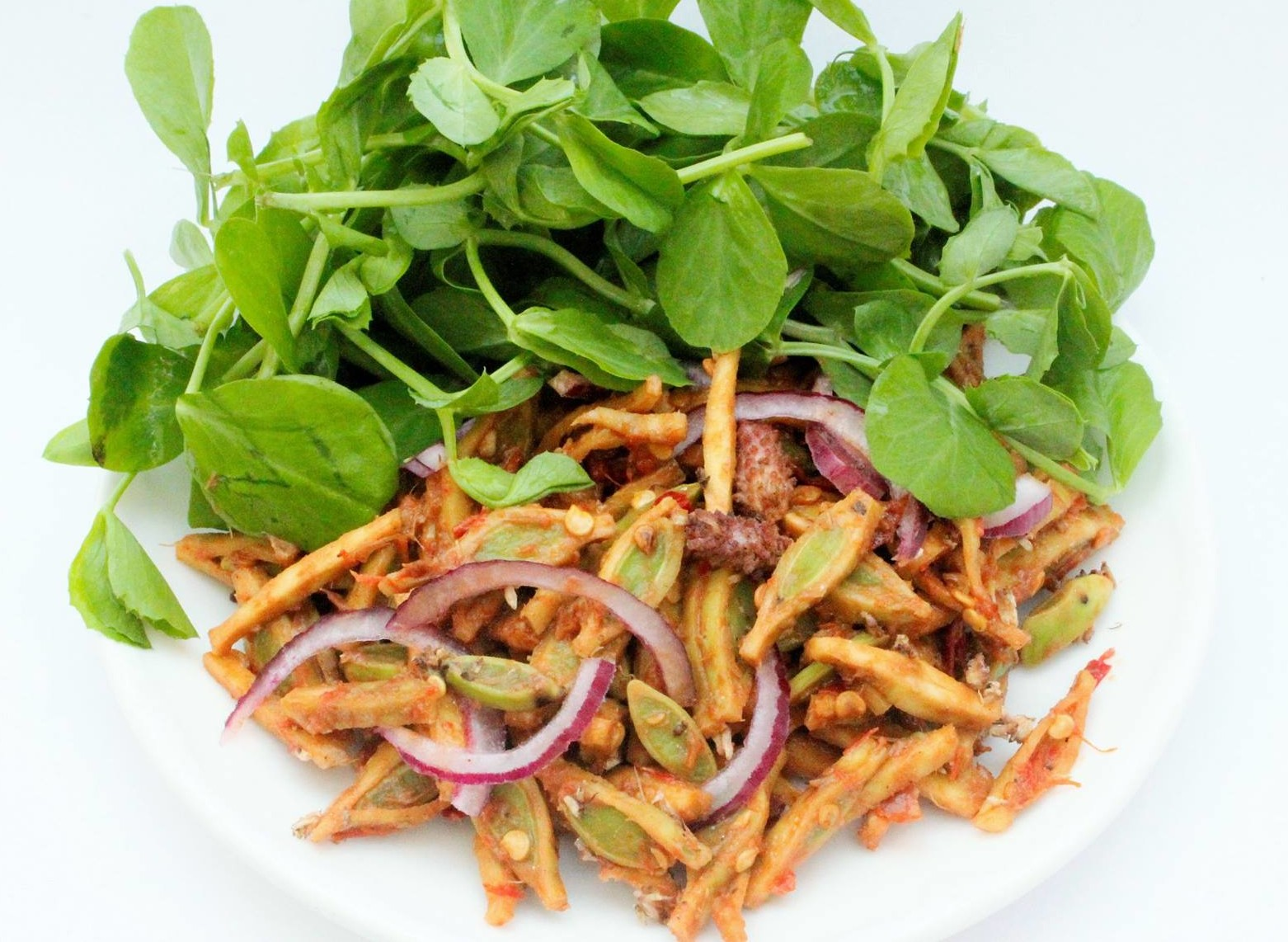
- Yongchaak singju. Yongchaak (stink beans) is accompanied by hawai maton (sweet pea shoots).
- Place of origin: India
- Region or state: Manipur
- Variations: seasonal vegetables

Singju (Meitei: ꯁꯤꯡꯖꯨ; pronounced sing-zoo) is a dish from Manipur. It originated within the Meitei culture but has been widely adopted by most of the ethnic communities of the state and in some neighbouring states of Northeast India. Often served as a spicy side dish, it is also popular as an afternoon or evening snack.

Given that its main ingredient is seasonal vegetables, singju has many variations. However, there are two main types: ngari-based and thoiding-besan-based. Ngari is a kind of fermented fish, the flavour of which forms the backbone of Manipuri cuisine. Roasted ngari-based singju is more popular; however, it is not usually sold by local singju vendors due to the high cost of ngari. The Thoiding-Besan version (with roasted perilla seeds and chickpea flour) therefore is more widely available from Singju vendors. Thoiding (Meitei: ꯊꯣꯢꯗꯤꯡ) is an oily seed obtained from the Korean perilla, which, when roasted, gives a nutty flavour. A mixture of roasted thoiding (perilla seeds) and roasted besan (chickpea flour) gives a flavour that is distinctive to singju. This latter non-ngari version is also served in religious feasts where fish and meat is prohibited (especially when there is the death of someone in the family; Meitei usually do not take fish or meat).

== History ==
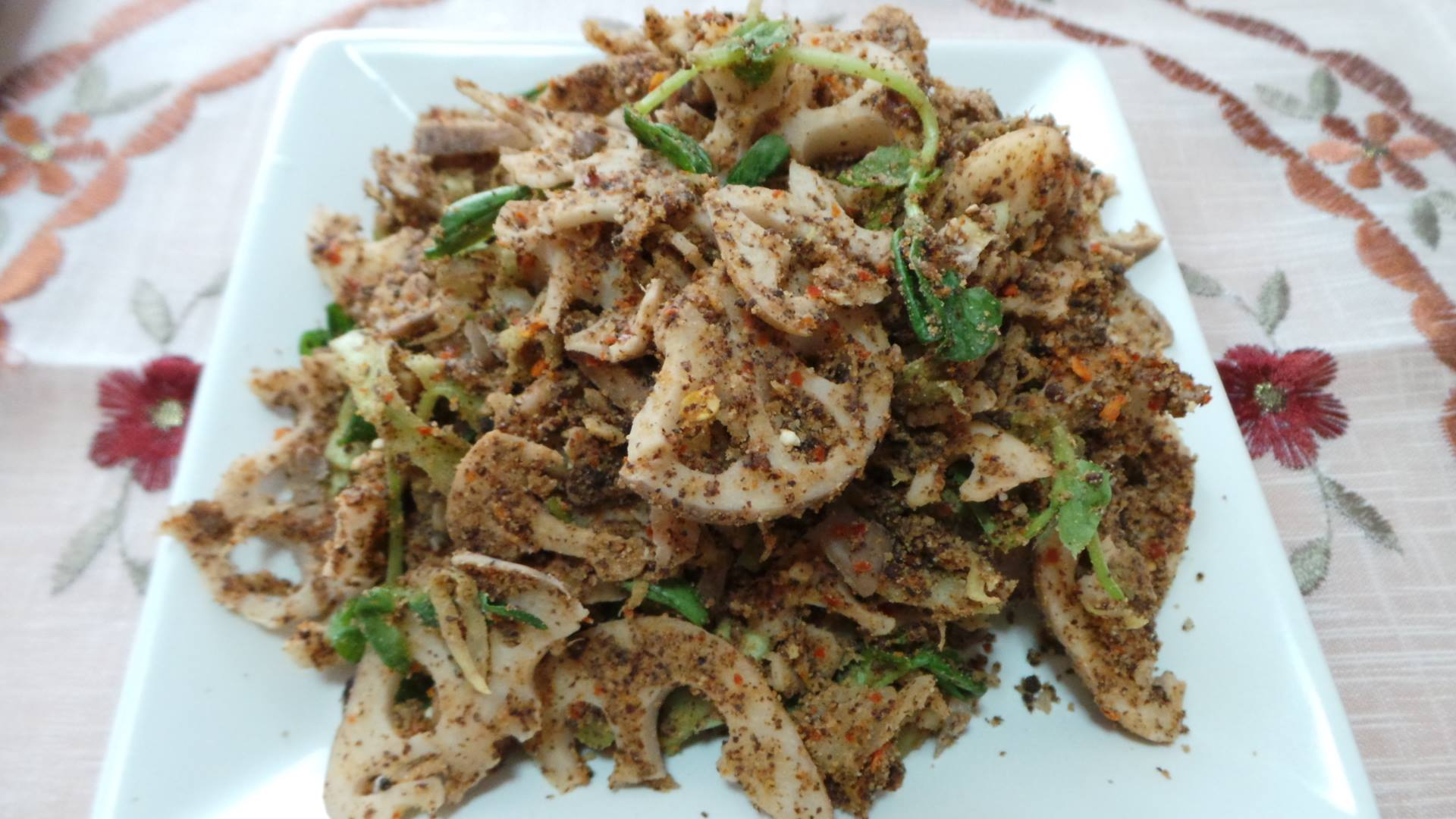
A vegetarian Singju with lotus root as the main ingredient

Manipur, being one of the most ancient independent kingdoms of South Asia, before becoming a part of India in 1949, has many distinctive local customs and traditions, owing to various influences throughout time. The word "Singju" comes from two words - "Manaa-Masing" and "Suba". "Manaa-Masing" means green vegetables and "Suba" means combining. Therefore, in rapid pronunciation the word "Manaa-Masing" drops to "Sing" and the word "Suba" transform to "Ju" for the better pronouncement. As a result, the word, "Singju" was born.

== Preparation ==
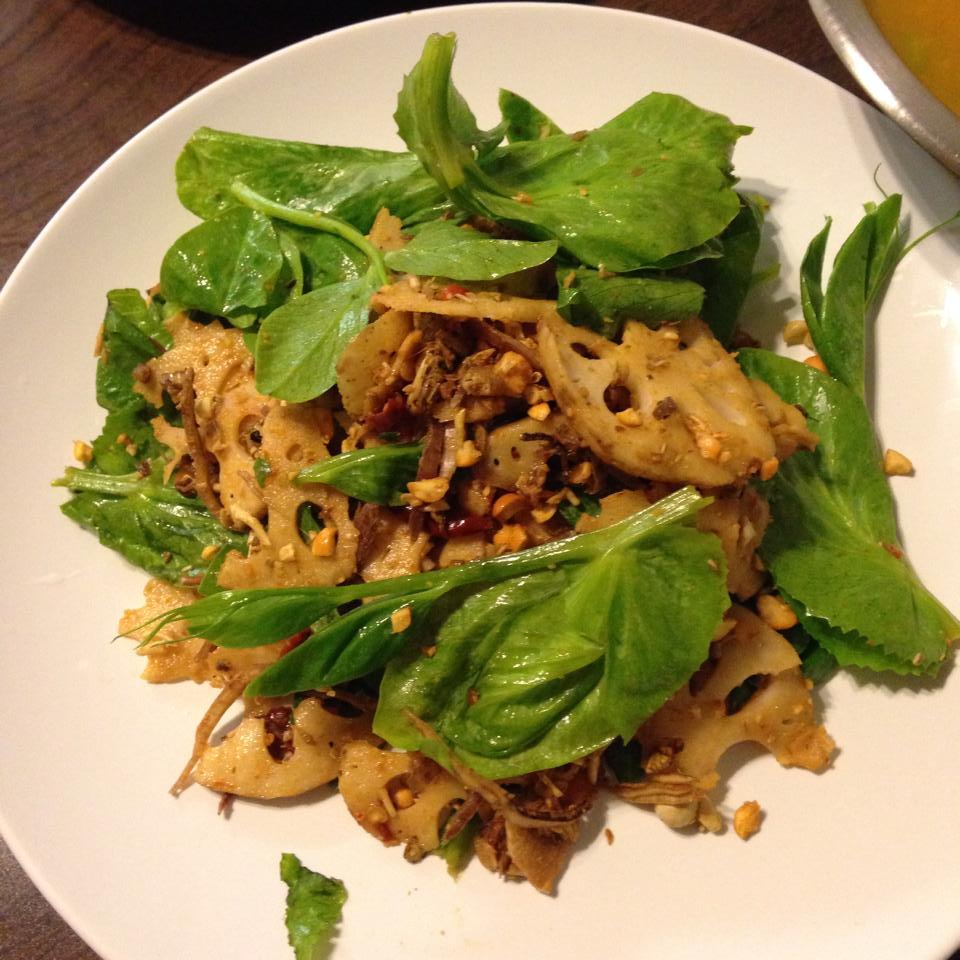
A non-veg Singju by Lotus stem as its main ingredient

Singju is a versatile dish that may be made vegetarian or non-vegetarian. There are two distinct ways to prepare singju.

=== Vegetarian ===
A vegetarian singju is mainly served in ritual feasts of the Meitei people, which are observed at home courtyards or shrine yards, or community complexes. It can be eaten at family homes too, but typically people prefer the non-vegetarian versions in a non-ritual context.

In this form of the dish, the main ingredients are perilla seeds (thoiding in Meitei), chanaa powder (Besan), salt, chillies and various green leafy vegetables (compatible vegetables are listed below).

This type of Singju is also prepared by combining fresh vegetables and herbs with uncooked instant noodles, called Mimi also known as Mimi Singju. This inclusion of uncooked noodles adds a satisfying crunch and texture to the dish, elevating it to new heights of culinary delight.

=== Non-vegetarian ===
A non-vegetarian version of singju is mainly eaten at home, and widely sold in restaurants all over Manipur, and in some other areas of India as well. The tag "non-veg" is because of the use of the fermented fish ingredient Ngari. Because of this, it cn not be served at ritual feasts of the community, which must be vegetarian.

In this type, the main ingredients are Ngari (a Manipuri form of fermented fish), salt, chillies, and green leafy vegetables (compatible vegetables' list are listed below).

It can also be made with chicken, beef, pork or shrimp. However, Meitei Pangals do not eat pork singju.

== Common singju vegetable ingredients ==
Any vegetable can be used to make singju, but some are more popular than others. Popular additions include:

1. Lotus stem (Thambou in Meitei)
2. Stink Bean (Yongchaak)
3. Cabbage (Kobiful)
4. Cauliflower (Kobi-Lei)
5. Hawai Debi or Tebi
6. Sweet Pea Shoots (Hawai Maton)
7. Unripe Papaya (Awaa Thabi)
8. Banana Flower (Laphu Tharo)
9. Rice Bean (Chakhawai)
10. Onion (Tilhou)

== Morok metpa or ametpa ==
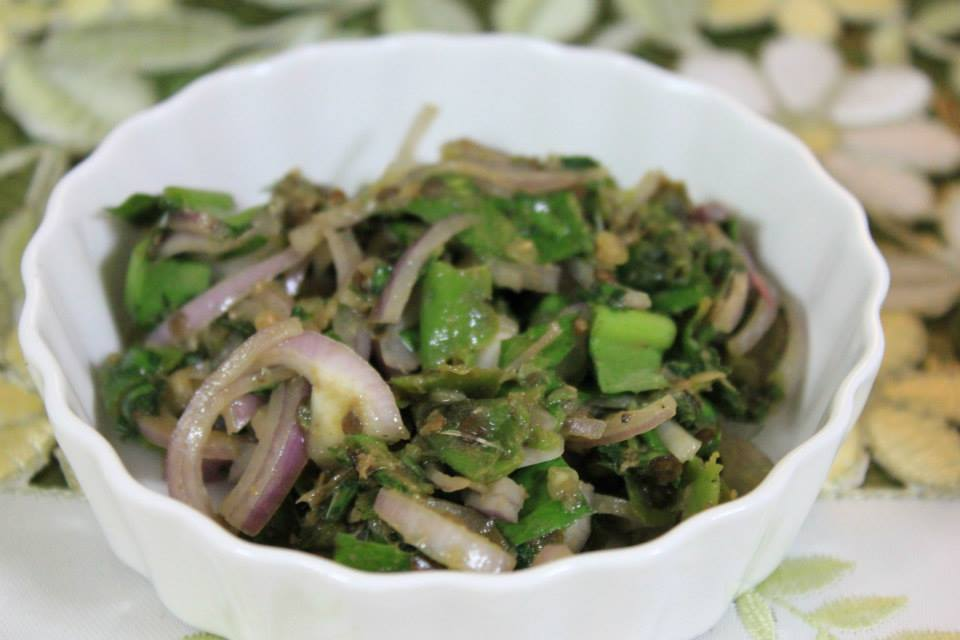
A smaller version of singju usually eaten with meals

Morok metpa or ametpa is another singju-like side dish. Morok means 'chilli' and metpa/ametpa means 'crush'. It is traditionally eaten along with daily meals at home but not served at rituals. Like singju, it can be prepared in two ways, vegetarian and non-vegetarian; the former is usually eaten during the mourning period until the shraddha ceremony (for Meitei Hindus) or the janazah ceremony (for Meitei Pangals) or after the burial ceremony (for Meitei Christians) or on days when people skip any type of fish or meat due to religious beliefs. It is usually made by frying red chillies, chives and onions as opposed to the usual steamed or roasted fermented fish and chillies eaten every day.

== See also ==
- Manipuri cuisine
- Eromba
- Kachumber
- Kosambari
