= Combination plate =

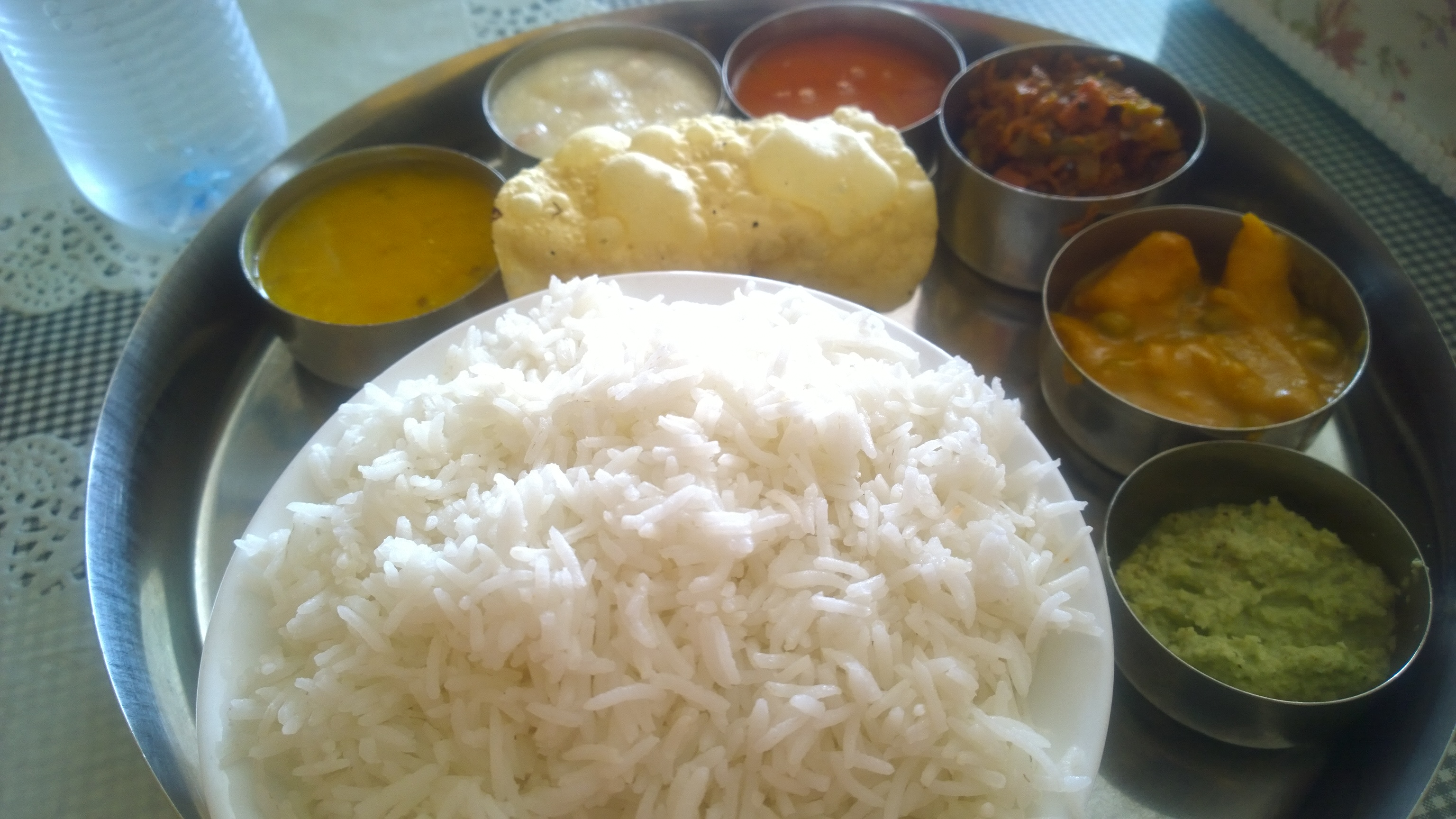
South Indian style vegetarian thali or unavu served in a restaurant.

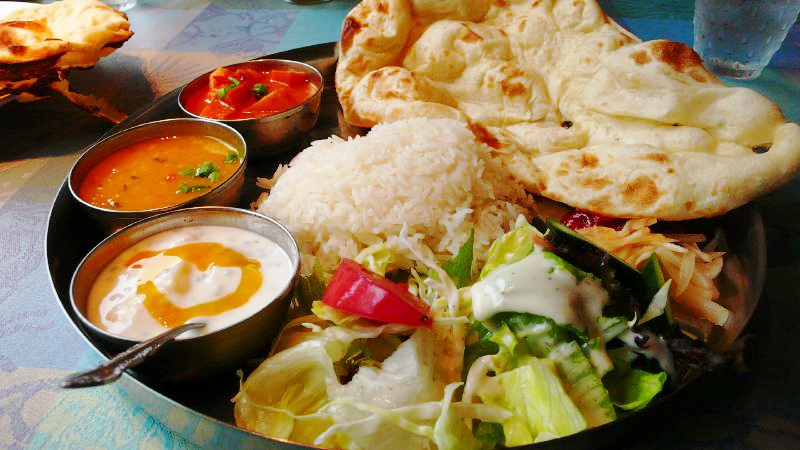
North Indian style vegetarian thali served in a restaurant.

A combination plate can refer to several things, including:

- A combination meal
- A type of tableware
- A type of dental dentures
- Crystals and/or minerals that have formed in a combination,
- A printing plate that has both line drawings and halftones
- A combination wall plate molded with a variety of ports for various electrical items, such as switches and plugs.

== Meal ==
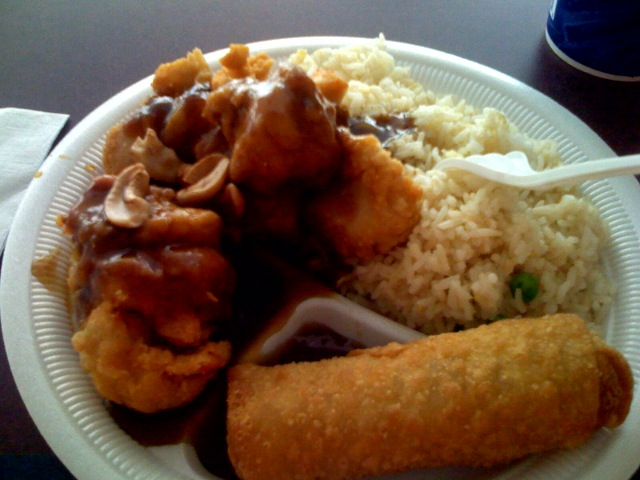
A combination plate of American Chinese food, served on a disposable compartment plate dish

A combination plate may refer to a meal or plate with a combination of foods, including:

- Plate lunch, a traditional Hawaiian meal consisting of rice, macaroni salad, and an entrée.
- Meat and three, a Southern American meal featuring one meat and three side dishes.
- Blue-plate special, a low-cost daily meal special served in diners.
- Thali, an Indian meal comprising various dishes served on a single platter.
- Airline meal, a pre-packaged meal served to passengers on an airplane.
- Bento, a Japanese single-portion meal typically packed in a box.
- Pu pu platter, a tray of American Chinese appetizers.
- Meze, a selection of small dishes served as appetizers in Mediterranean cuisine.
- Tiffin, a light meal or snack, especially popular in India.
- Charcuterie, a platter of cured meats, often accompanied by cheese, fruits, and nuts.
- Munchy box, a Scottish fast-food meal consisting of a variety of fried foods served in a pizza box.
- Prison food, meals provided to inmates in a prison.
- Garrison ration, a standardized meal provided to soldiers stationed in a military garrison.
- TV dinner, a pre-packaged frozen meal that can be heated and served.

== Tableware ==
A combination plate may refer to a type of tableware plate, dish or platter that is designed with separate compartments for foods to be placed in. This has also been referred to as a compartment plate and a partition plate. Combination plate meals are sometimes served on this type of plate. In Nepal, this type of plate is called a thaali, and is typically made of metal. In Nepalese cuisine, the dish daal bhaat is often served on a thaali. In the United States, compartment plates have been used to serve table d'hôte dinners. In the United States, combination plates have been used as a part of U.S. army mess kits.

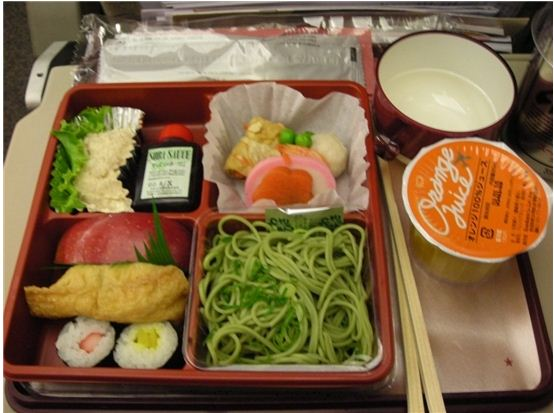
An airline meal served on a partition tray

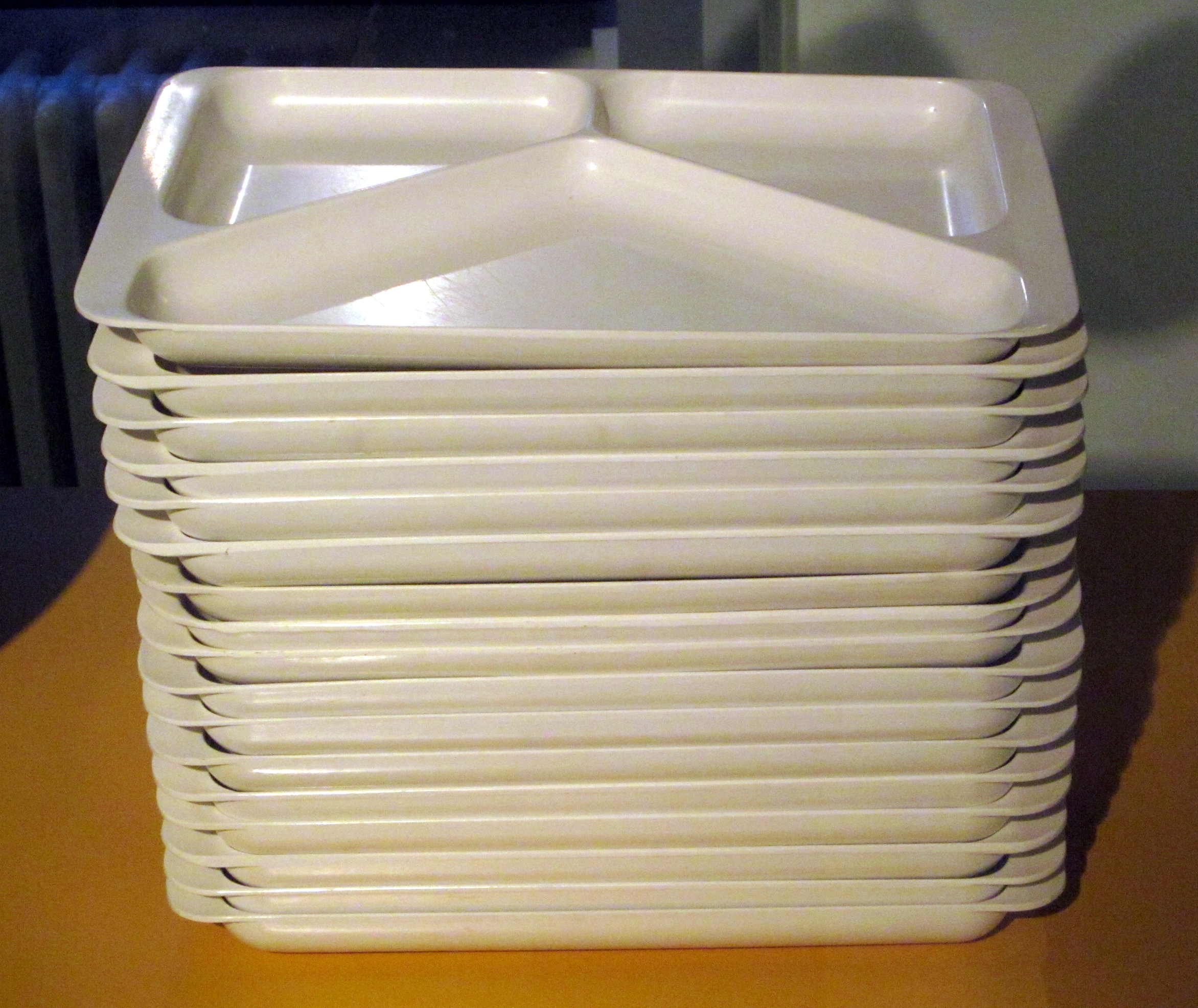
Plastic partitioned tableware

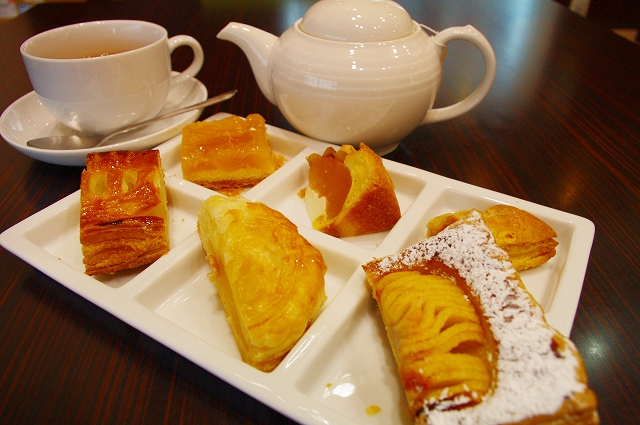
Apple pies served on partitioned tableware

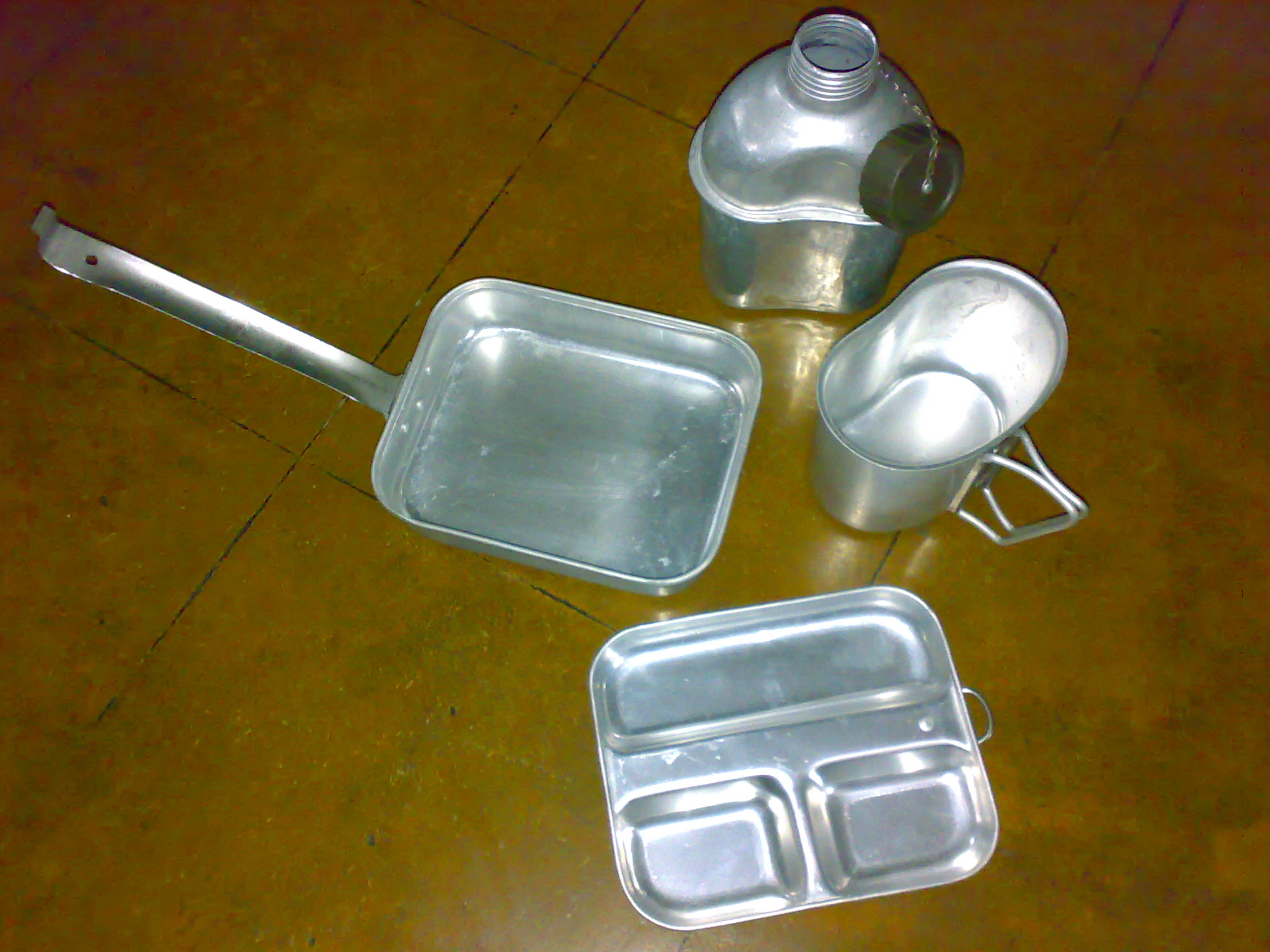
A mess kit with a combination plate (bottom)

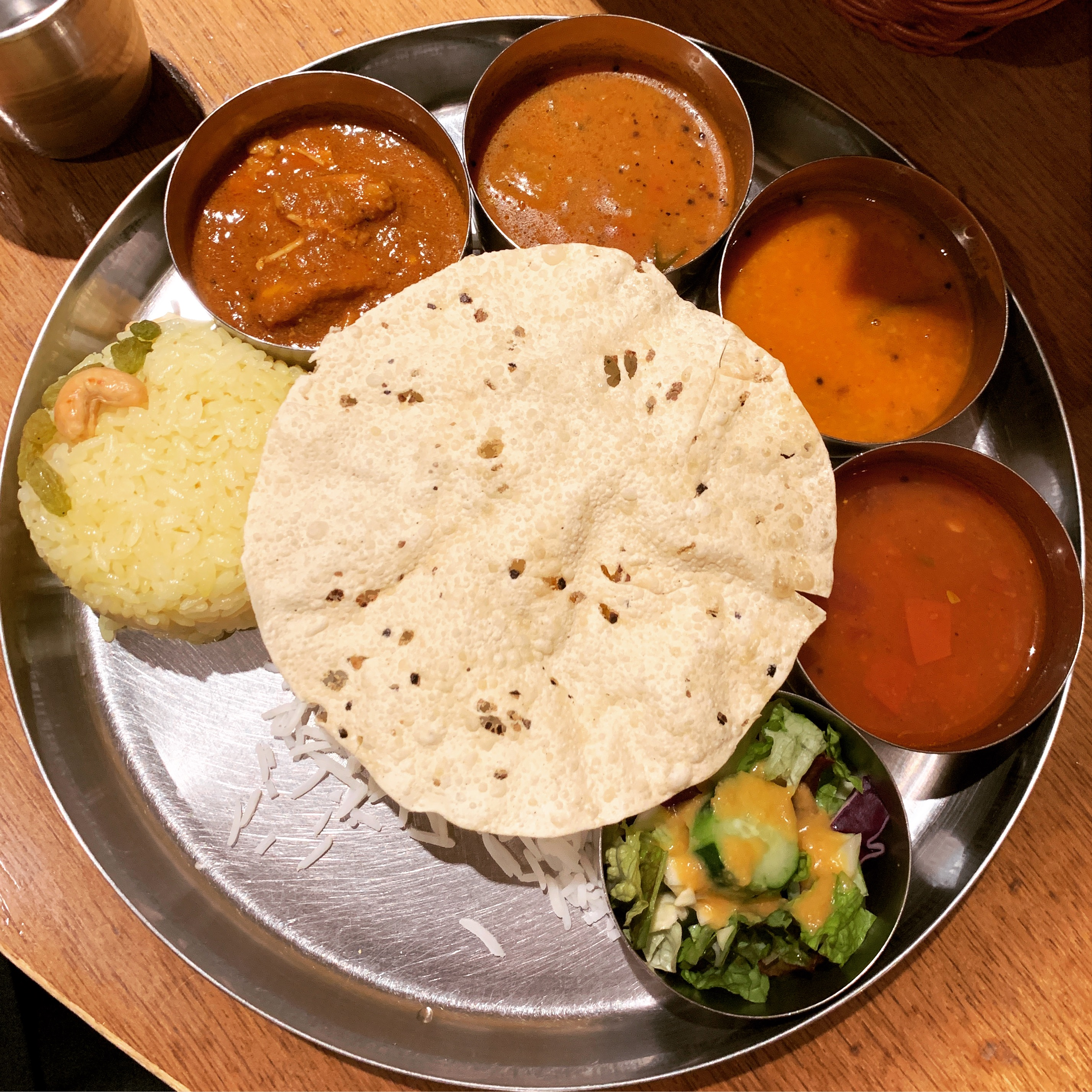
Round combination plates serving Indian food

== Dentures ==
In dentistry, the term has referred to dentures prepared and cast with a combination of materials, such as gold and rubber, plastic and metallic material, and gold and porcelain.

== Gemology ==
In gemology, a combination plate refers to two or more crystals and/or minerals that have formed in a combination.

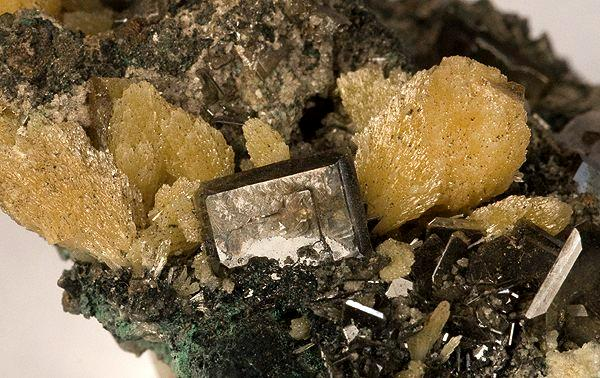
A rare and fine combination plate from the Tsumeb Mine. Glassy, mostly transparent, smoky-colored wulfenite crystals with sharp beveled edges are richly and aesthetically scattered on the matrix. Bundles of lustrous, yellowish-tan mimetite are concentrated at the top of the piece, and the largest wulfenite, at 9 mm, is aesthetically framed by two mimetite crystal clusters.

== Printing ==
In printing and graphic arts, a printing plate that has "both halftones and line drawings, often combined"

== Wall plate ==
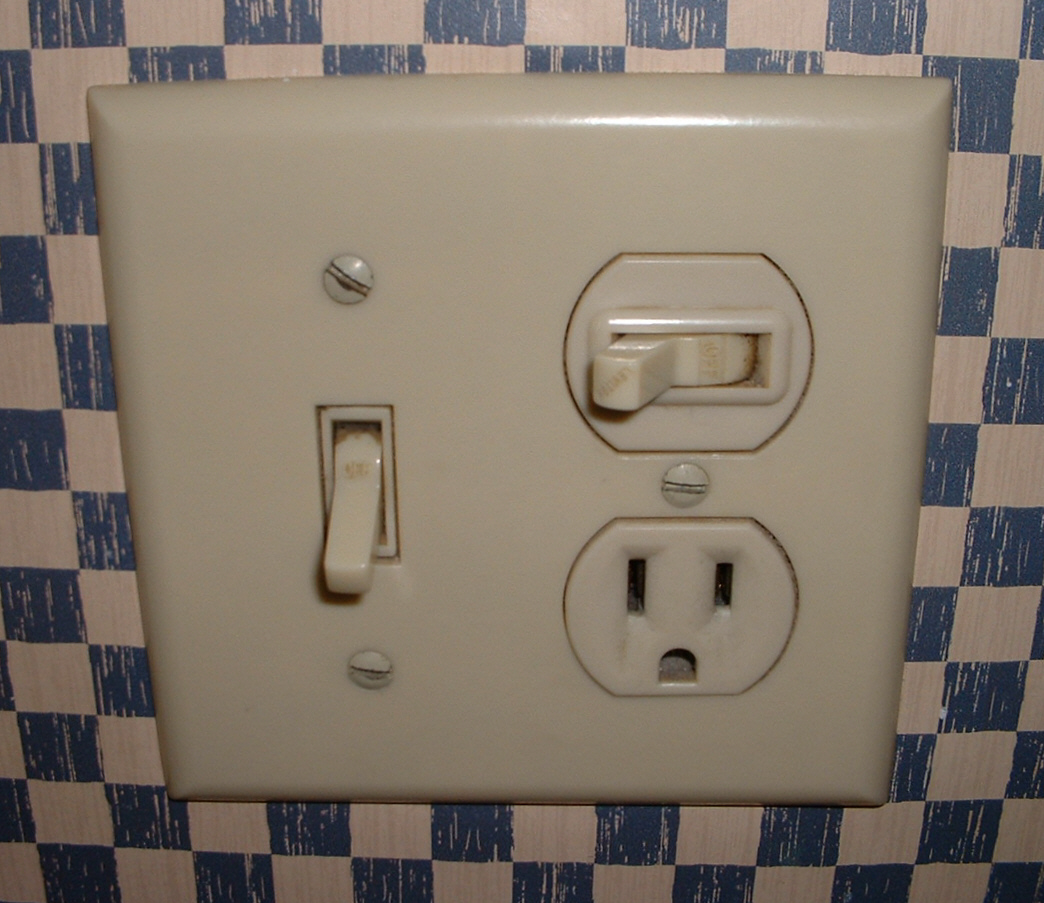
A combination wall plate

A combination plate can refer to a combination wall plate that has a combination of ports for switches, plugs, etc.

== See also ==
- Banchan
- Blue-plate special
- Foodpairing
- Meat and three
- Plate lunch
