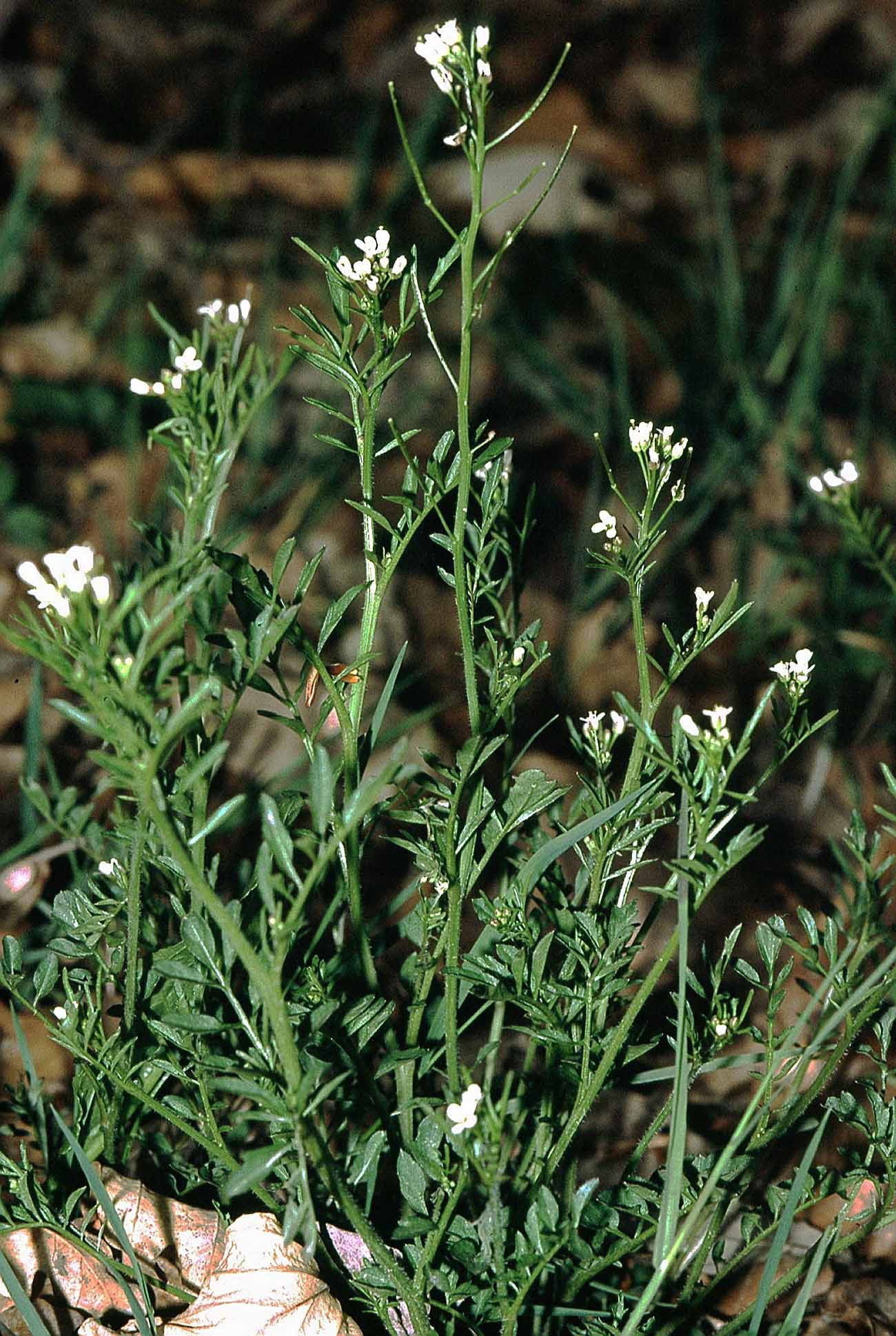

Scientific classification
- Kingdom: Plantae
- Clade: Tracheophytes
- Clade: Angiosperms
- Clade: Eudicots
- Clade: Rosids
- Order: Brassicales
- Family: Brassicaceae
- Genus: Cardamine
- Species: C. flexuosa

Binomial name
- Cardamine flexuosa With.

= Cardamine flexuosa =

Species of flowering plant in the cabbage family

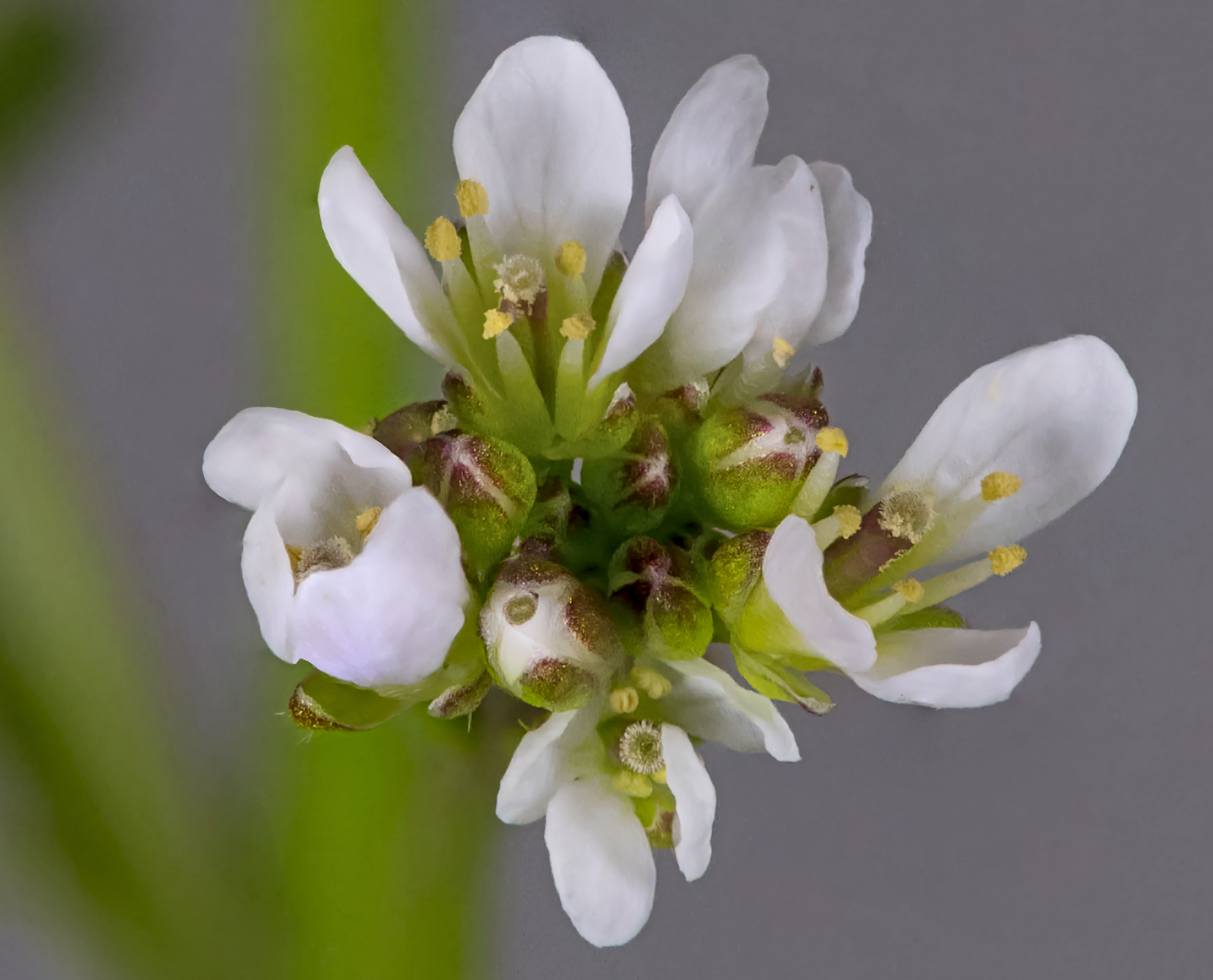
Inflorescence

Cardamine flexuosa, commonly known as wavy bittercress or wood bitter-cress, is an herbaceous annual, biennial, or short-lived perennial plant in the cabbage family (Brassicaceae).

== Description ==
This is a small flowering plant growing to a height of no more than 30 cm (12 in), usually annual or short-lived perennial, with few short, erect stems. The leaves pinnate, mostly at the base, each with about 5 pairs of rounded leaflets. Flowers very small, white, 3–4 mm across with 6 stamens. Fruits of C. flexuosa generally do not overtop the flowers, a feature distinguishing it from Cardamine hirsuta.

== Distribution ==
It is native to the British Isles, Europe, North Africa, Turkey and Iran and widely introduced elsewhere.

== Habitat ==
In Ireland common in woods shady and damp places.

== Uses ==
In the Northeast Indian state of Manipur, where it is known as chaantruk, C. flexuosa is eaten as an aromatic herb, often used to garnish eromba.
