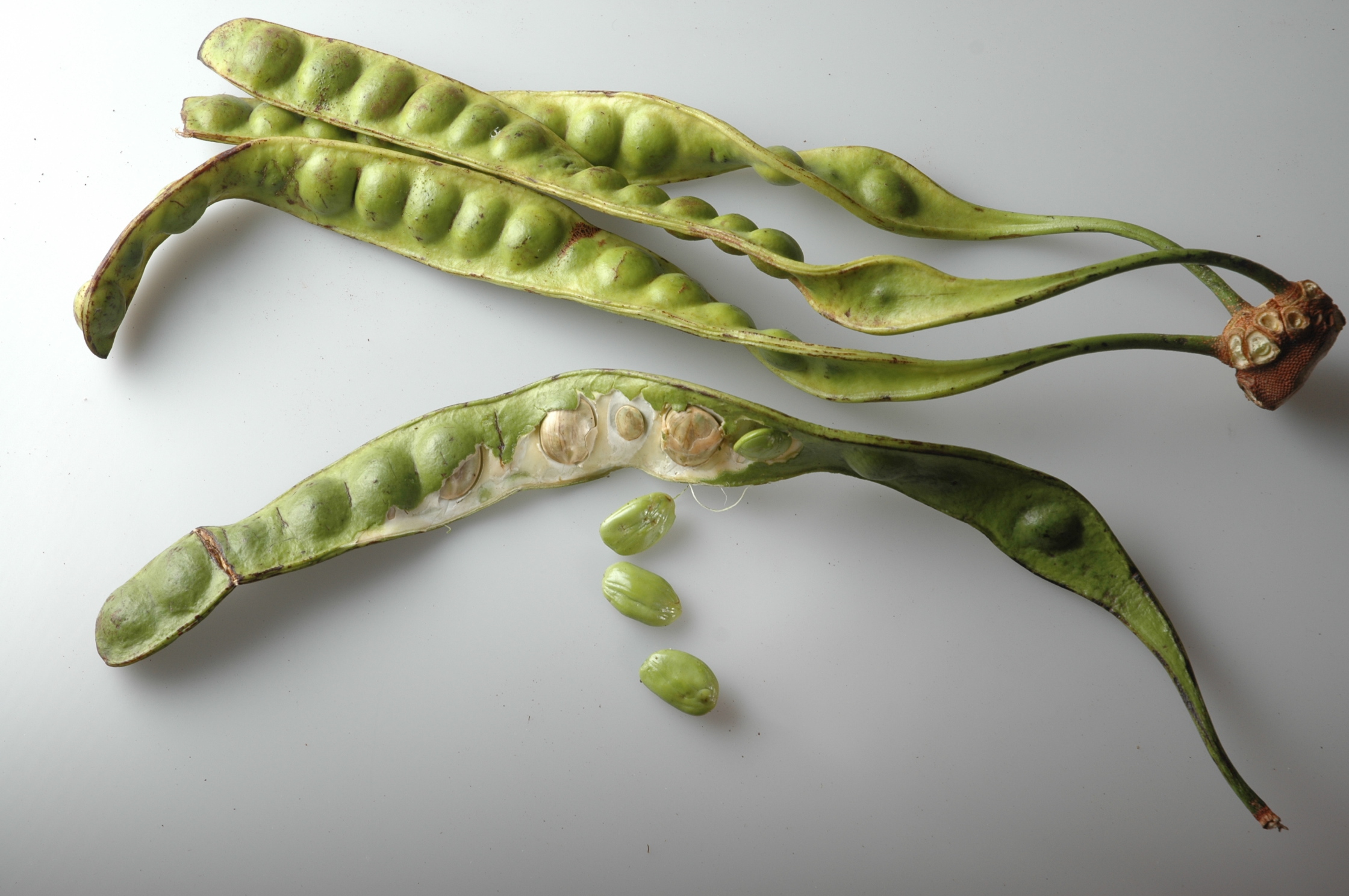
- Seed pods

Conservation status
- Least Concern (IUCN 3.1)

Scientific classification
- Kingdom: Plantae
- Clade: Tracheophytes
- Clade: Angiosperms
- Clade: Eudicots
- Clade: Rosids
- Order: Fabales
- Family: Fabaceae
- Subfamily: Caesalpinioideae
- Clade: Mimosoid clade
- Genus: Parkia
- Species: P. speciosa

Binomial name
- Parkia speciosa Hassk.

Synonyms
- Acacia gigantea Noronha; Inga pyriformis Jungh. ex Miq.; Mimosa pedunculata W.Hunter; Parkia graveolens Prain; Parkia harbesonii Elmer; Parkia macrocarpa Miq.

= Parkia speciosa =

Species of flowering plant

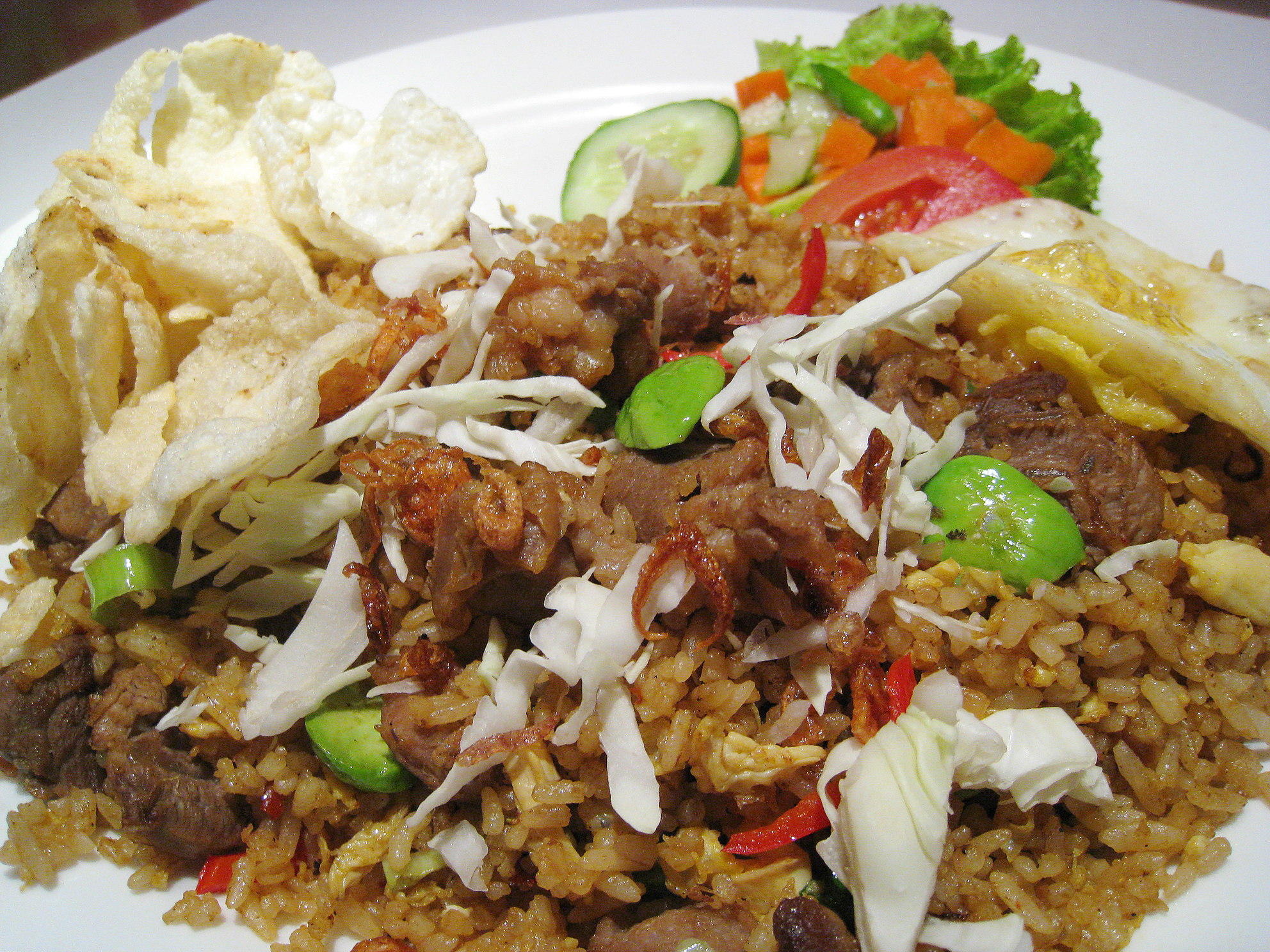
Nasi goreng kambing pete in Jakarta, fried rice with goat meat and stink beans

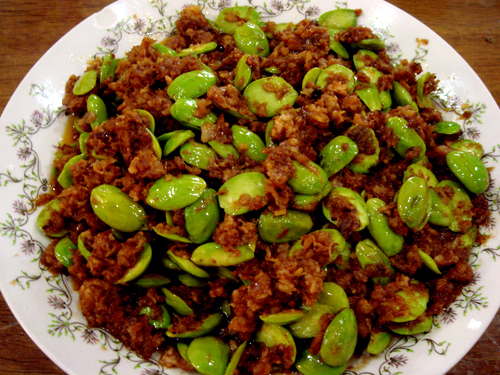
A Malaysian petai beans dish with minced meat, dried shrimp, chili, onions, belacan, and soy sauce

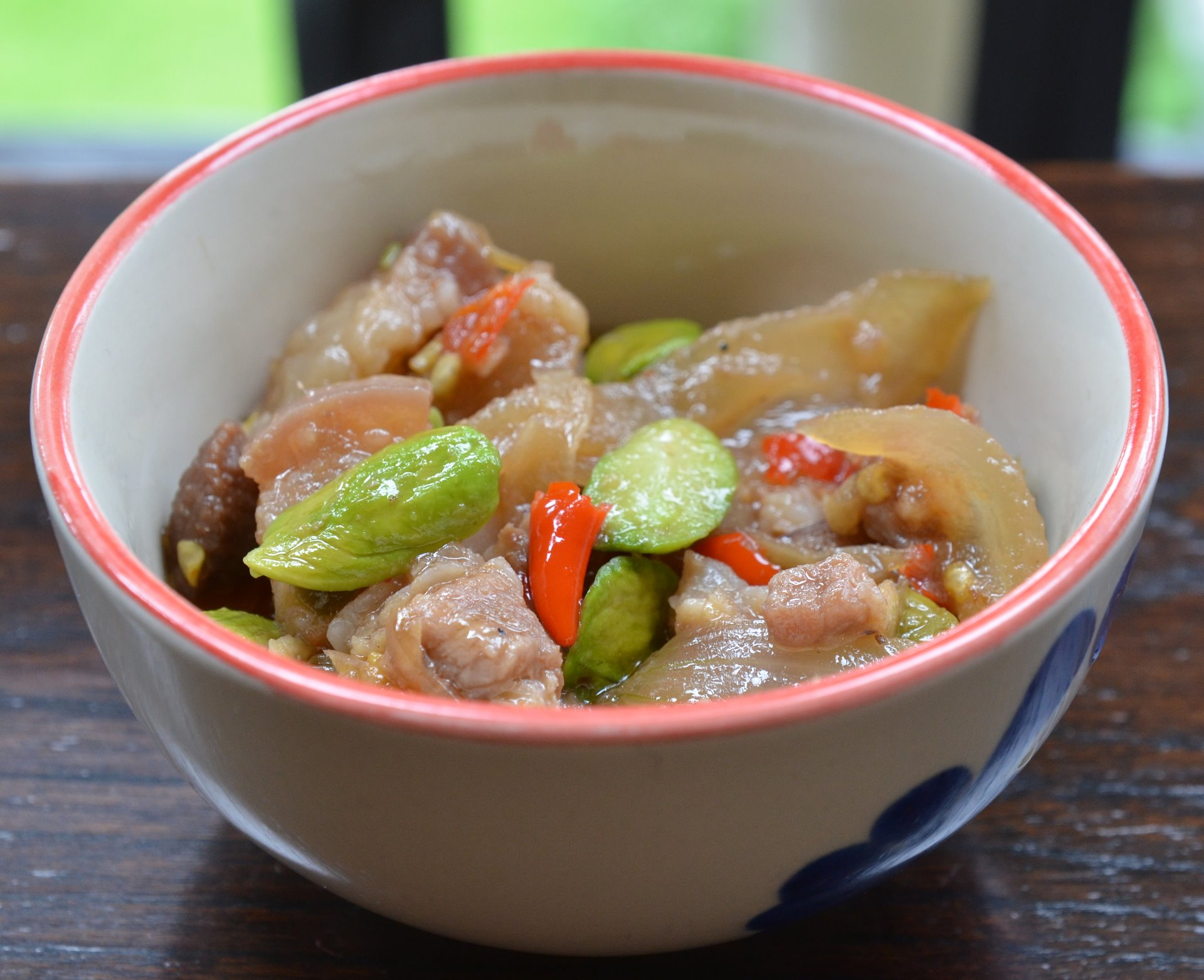
Thai mu phat sato, pork stir-fried with stink beans

Parkia speciosa, the bitter bean, twisted cluster bean, sator bean, stink bean, or petai is a plant of the genus Parkia in the family Fabaceae. It bears long, flat edible beans with bright green seeds the size and shape of plump almonds that have a rather peculiar smell that is similar to but stronger than that of the shiitake mushroom, due to sulfur-containing compounds also found in shiitake, truffles, and cabbage.

== Botanical description ==
The petai tree can grow to about 30 metres. It bears flowers in a light bulb-shaped mass at the end of long stalks. The flowers secrete a nectar that attracts bats and other pollinators. The fruits emerge as long, twisted, translucent pods in a cluster of seven or eight pods. When those pods are mature, within them will reside the petai beans or seeds.

== Uses ==
=== Cooking ===
The beans of other Parkia species (for example, Parkia javanica and Parkia singularis) are also popular as culinary ingredients in Brunei, Indonesia, Laos, Malaysia, Myanmar, Singapore, southern Thailand, and northeastern India, especially Assam, Nagaland, Manipur, Mizoram and Tripura (consumed mostly by the Tiprasa people). They are sold in bunches, still in the pod, or the seeds are sold in plastic bags. Pods are gathered from the wild, or from cultivated trees: they are exported in jars or cans, pickled in brine, or frozen.

The vegetable is widely known by the Malay term petai in Brunei, Indonesia, Malaysia, Singapore, and Malay-speaking parts of southern Thailand. In the marketplace, depending on the country of origin, Parkia species may be labelled Wakerec, Petai, in Assamese Gachhua uri, in Rongmei Kamv, in Meitei Yongchak, in Thadou Jongla,. They are best when combined with other strongly flavoured foods such as garlic, chili peppers, dried shrimp or shrimp paste, as in sambal petai. When young, the pods are flat because the seeds have not yet developed, and they hang like a bunch of slightly twisted ribbons, pale green, almost translucent. At this stage they may be eaten raw, fried or pickled. Young tender pods with undeveloped beans can be used whole in stir-fried dishes.

The seeds are also dried and seasoned for later consumption. When dried, the seeds turn black. Petai beans or seeds look like broad beans. Like mature broad beans, they may have to be peeled before cooking. Petai has earned its nickname 'stink bean' because its strong smell is very pervasive. It lingers in the mouth and body. Like asparagus, it contains certain amino acids that give a strong smell to one's urine, an effect that can be noticed up to two days after consumption. Like other beans, their complex carbohydrates can also cause strong-smelling rectal gas.

==== India ====
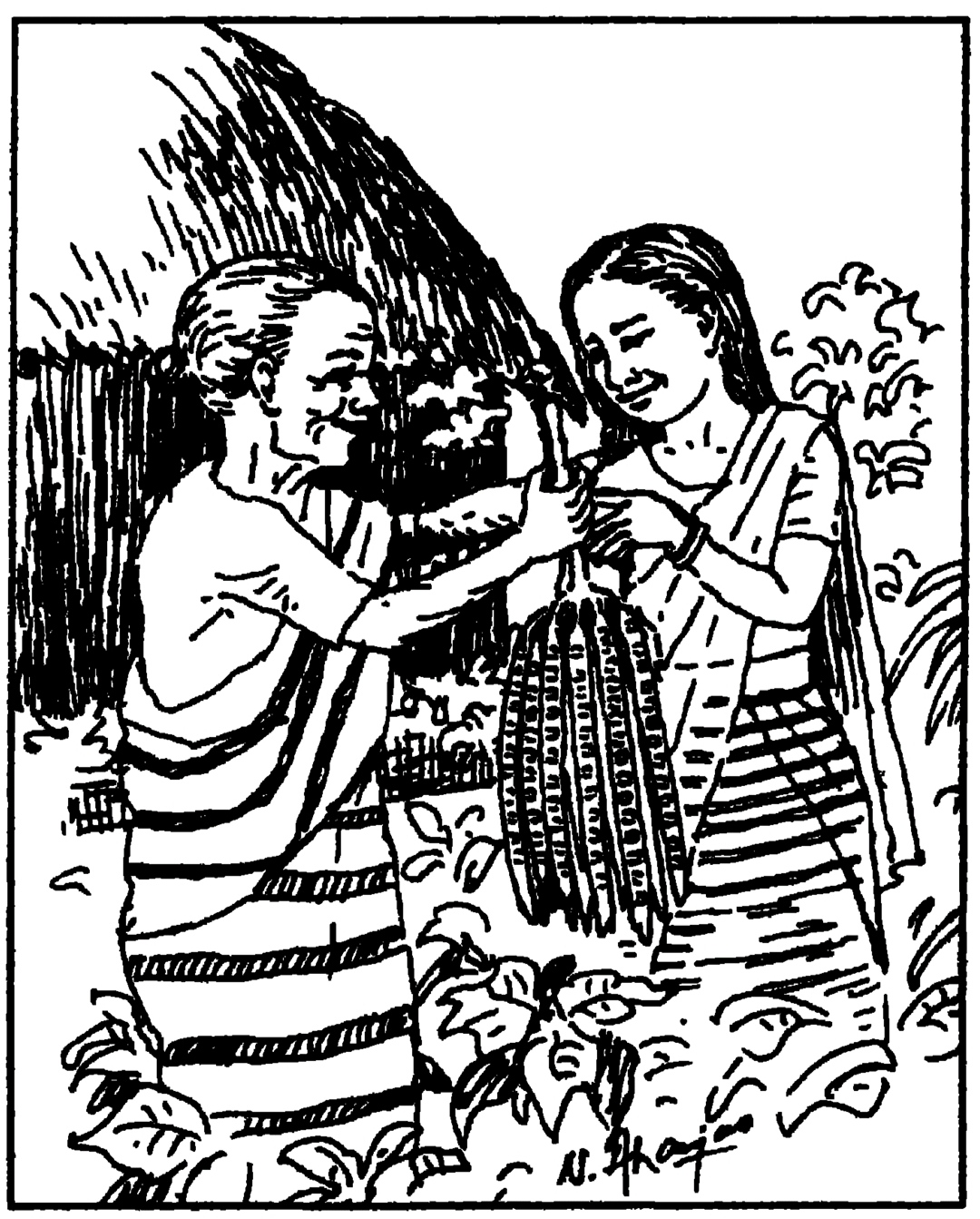
A bunch of Yongchaak (Meitei for 'Parkia speciosa') is generally used as a part of gifts presented to honourable people in Manipur. It shows a Thangal woman presenting the Yongchaak to a Meitei lady.

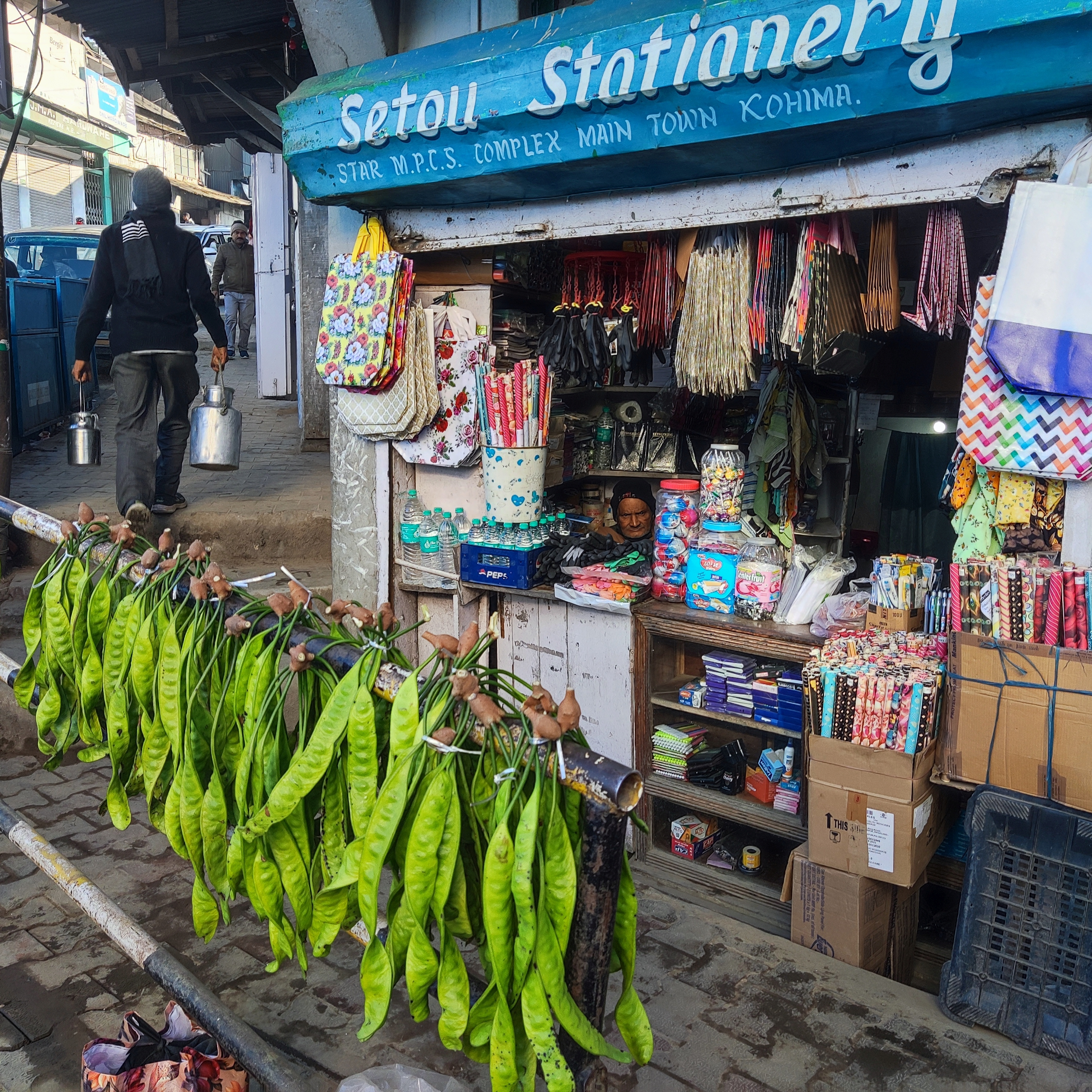
Parkia speciosa being sold in Nagaland

In Manipur, it is called yongchak. It is grown mainly on all the hilly areas and some other parts of Manipur valley. Varieties found here are somewhat harder than the counterparts of Thailand or Malaysia. The wild variety from the hills is more commonly sold in market. Some species of Parkia are grown in small scale by farmers in northeast India. In mainland India, it is grown as an ornamental plant, shade tree and border tree. This bean has become an important ingredient in many food items in Tripura too.

In Manipur, the seeds or the bean as a whole are eaten by preparing a local delicacy called Hmarcha dêng, Eromba (a traditional Manipuri chutney) or Yongchak singju (a traditional Manipuri salad). Eromba is a very common cuisine in Manipur made with boiled potato, fermented fish, chili and other vegetables, in this case, Parkia. Yongchak singju is another favourite side dish made with Parkia cut into small pieces and then mixed with red hot chili paste. Parkia is also used for making various other dishes with fish and vegetables. The Kuki Tribe in North-East India, call it "Jongha". Rongmei Tribe of Manipur, Nagaland and Assam call it Gachhua uri which is cooked with meat or prepared as salad, and sometimes seeds are eaten with Chattni made of dry fish or Gankhiang khui (local fermented dry seed). The Hmar tribe of Assam, Mizoram, Meghalaya, Manipur call it Zawngṭa (pronounced Zongtra) and mainly prepare it with chilli, Sodium Bi-carbonate, little amount of salt and a special fermented pork called "Saum"(sa means meat, um means fermented) and called it Zawngṭa-râwt.

In Mizoram, the Mizo people are also very fond of it, and call it zawngṭah. They eat the bean by removing the thin green outer layer of the skin and also eat the seeds. It is eaten raw as a side dish or used as a recipe for chutney. It is also served as a side dish, mixed with chili and fermented pork fat called saum which is the same as sathu of Manipur. It is a very common side dish among the peoples of naga, Mizo (Zohnahthlak) like Mizo in Mizoram, Hmâr, Kuki, Chin, Zomi etc. in neighbouring states and countries. In Manipur, Assam, Tripura, the (Tripura people call it Wakerec mosedang) and Bangladesh Manipuris call it yongchak or wakerec in the local Manipuri dialect and consume it as a salad mixed with fermented fish or, the boiled or roasted seeds either alone or in a mash of boiled vegetables laced with fermented fish.

==== Indonesia ====
In Indonesia, petai is very popular in the highlands of Java and Sumatra. In Sundanese cuisine petai might be eaten raw with sambal as part of lalab, fried or grilled. It also can be stir fried and mixed with oncom. In Java and Sumatra, it can be added to sayur lodeh or sambal goreng ati petai (fried diced beef or chicken liver in sambal with petai). It is also a popular ingredient for goat meat fried rice. In Minangkabau cuisine it is a common sambal or lado ingredient for ayam pop (Padang-style fried chicken).

==== Brunei, Malaysia & Singapore ====
In Brunei, Malaysia and Singapore, petai is a popular ingredient in Malay and Nyonya cuisines. It is usually eaten raw as ulam, served with sambal, or mixed with dried shrimp, chili peppers, red onions, belacan (prawn paste), soy sauce and prawn.

Another popular side dish to nasi lemak or plain rice is petai cooked with fried dry anchovies and sauteed chili sambal (sambal tumis). Petai fried rice is also a common dish widely available in Malay restaurants.

==== Thailand ====
In Thailand it is called sah-taw (Thai: สะตอ, RTGS: sato), as in mu phat sah-taw, stir-fried pork with stink beans. It's popular ingredient in many dishes within Southern Thailand cuisine and can be found easily in this area and some parts of Bangkok where Southern Thailand-inspired restaurants located.
