= Chak-Hao black rice =

Type of non-basmati aromatic black rice from Manipur, India

Chak-Hao
- Geographical indication
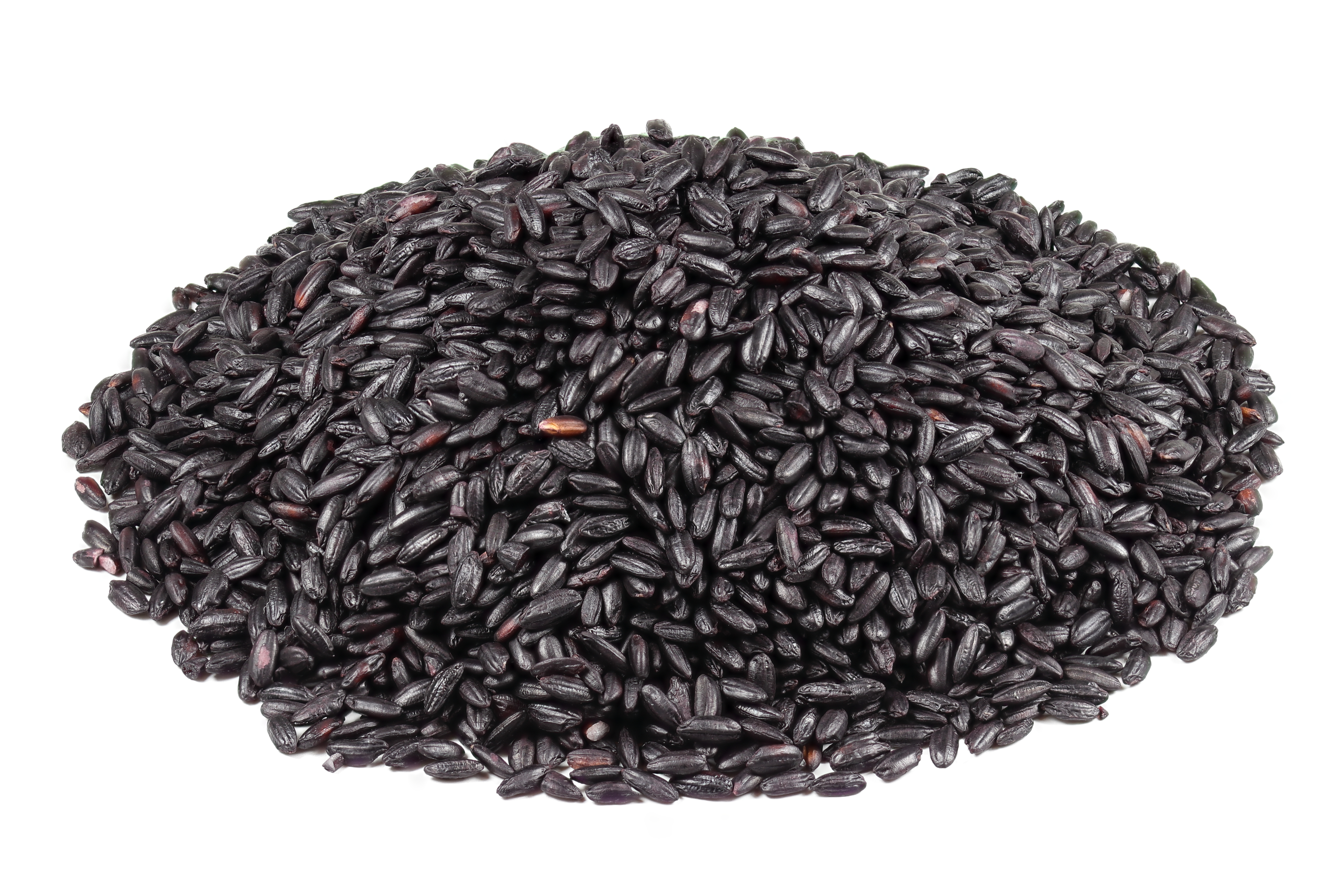
- Chak-Hao Black rice
- Alternative names: Chak Hao Amubi, Manipur Black rice
- Description: Chak-Hao is a rice variety cultivated in Manipur and Nagaland
- Area: Manipur and Nagaland
- Country: India
- Registered: 20 April 2020
- Official website: ipindia.gov.in

Chak-Hao is an aromatic, glutinous, and large-grained black rice variety mainly grown in the Indian states of Manipur and Nagaland. It is a common and widely cultivated crop in the districts of Imphal East, Imphal West, Bishnupur, and Thoubal of Manipur and Peren district of Nagaland. Chak-Hao or Chakhao or Chak Hao Amubi are variations of the same name. It is popularly called the Black Rice of Manipur or Manipur Black Rice.

Under its Geographical Indication tag, it is referred to as "Chak-Hao".

== Name ==
Chak-Hao, literally translated as "Delicious rice" in the local state language of Manipuri (Meitei); with "Chak" meaning "rice" while the word "Ahaoba" means "delicious".

== Varieties ==
Manipur's scented rice varieties are classified by farmers based on grain color into four types: Chakhao Amubi (Black), Chakhao Poireiton (Purple), Chakhao Angangba (Red), and Chakhao Angouba (White).

== Description ==
Black rice is described as aromatic, glutinous containing no gluten, sticky and soft after cooking, and is a purple color after cooking. It is grown without using agrochemicals. It is used for ceremonial purposes most notably ij the preparation of traditional purple rice Kheer (Chakhao kheer). It requires 40-45 minutes to cook due to the presence of the fibrous bran layer and higher crude fiber content.

== Geographical indication ==
It was awarded the Geographical Indication (GI) status tag from the Geographical Indications Registry, under the Union Government of India, on 20 April 2020 and is valid until 25 December 2027.

Consortium of Producers of Chak-Hao (Black Rice) from Imphal, proposed the GI registration of Chak-Hao. After filing the application in December 2017, the rice was granted the GI tag in 2020 by the Geographical Indication Registry in Chennai, making the name "Chak-Hao" exclusive to the rice grown in the region. It thus became the first rice variety from Manipur and Nagaland. It also is the 5th type of goods from Manipur and 4th the from Nagaland to earn the GI tag res,pectively.

The GI tag protects the rice from illegal selling and marketing, and gives it legal protection and a unique identity.
