= Salvia dianthera =

Scientific classification
- Kingdom: Plantae
- Clade: Tracheophytes
- Clade: Angiosperms
- Clade: Eudicots
- Clade: Asterids
- Order: Lamiales
- Family: Lamiaceae
- Genus: Salvia
- Species: S. dianthera

Binomial name
- Salvia dianthera Roth

Synonyms
- Meriandra abyssinica F.Muell.; Meriandra bengalensis (J.Koenig ex Roxb.) Benth.; Meriandra dianthera (Roth) Briq.; Salvia abyssinica R.Br., not validly publ.; Salvia bengalensis J.Koenig ex Roxb.; Salvia indica B.Heyne ex Roem. & Schult., pro syn.; Salvia schimperiana Hochst. ex Benth., pro syn.; Salvia stachydea Klein ex Schult.

Species of flowering plant

Salvia dianthera, synonym Meriandra dianthera, is a species of plant in the family Lamiaceae. It is native to Eritrea, Ethiopia, Saudi Arabia, Yemen, and India.
