= Eromba =

Indian ethnic dish

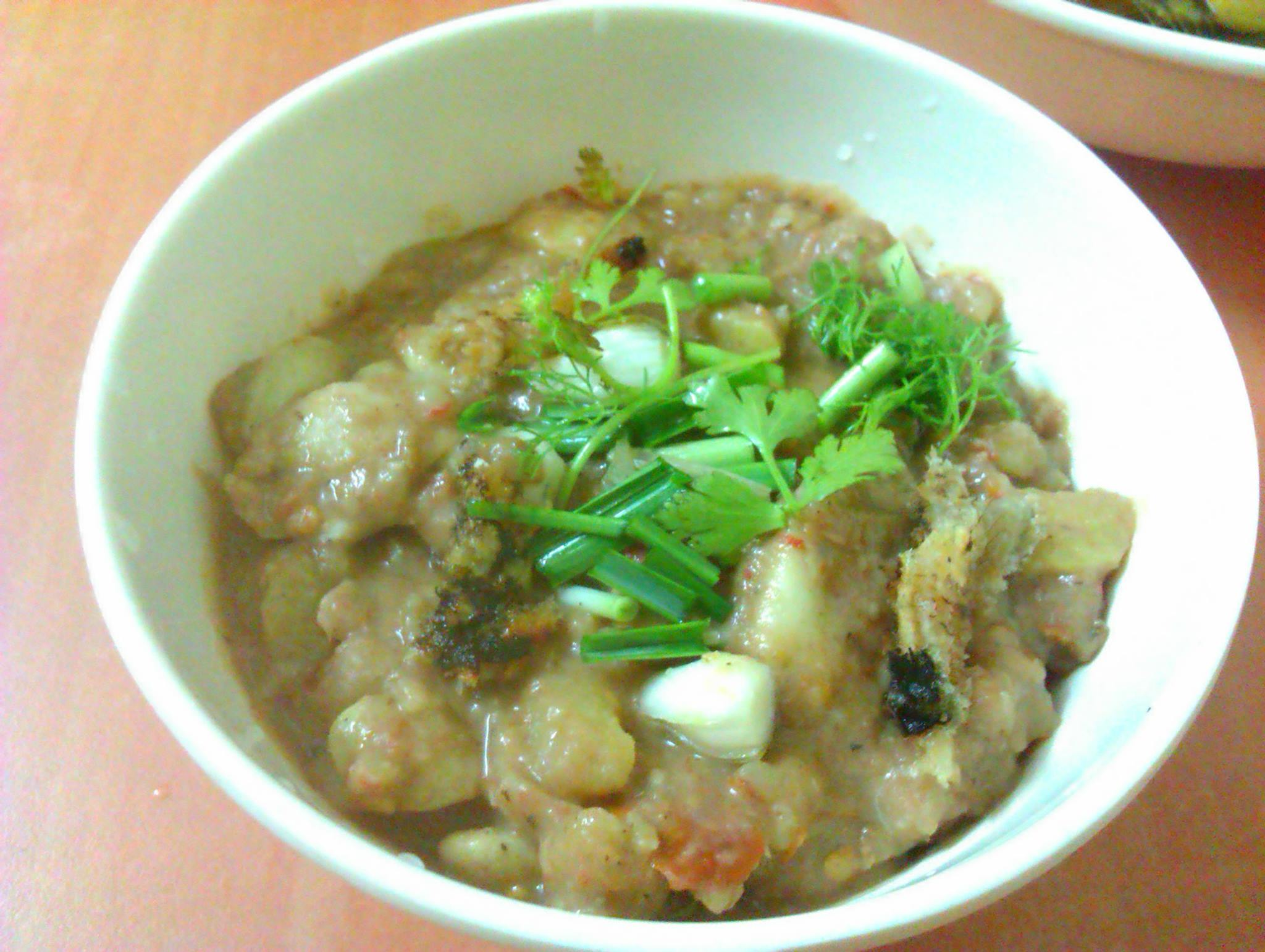
- A vegetarian type of eromba with stink bean as its main ingredient
- Alternative names: Eronba, erolba
- Type: Chutney
- Place of origin: India
- Region or state: Manipur

Eromba is an ethnic dish of the Meitei and Naga communities of Manipur, India.

== History ==
The word "eromba" comes from "eeru taana lonba", a Meitei term for a liquid that is mixed.

== Preparation ==
The vegetables (such as potatoes, stink beans, and garlic), spices (such as chilies) and herbs are boiled with or without ngari, a fermented fish product, then smashed with hands, whisked or blended with a blender.

== See also ==
- Cuisine of Manipur
