= Thongba =

Thongba (or Thongpa or Athongba or Athongpa) means "to cook" in verb form or "curry" in noun form in Meitei language and Meitei cuisine.

It may refer to:

- Chamthong Thongba, traditional Meitei vegetable stew curry
- Maroi Bori Thongba, traditional Meitei dish, mainly consisting of maroi herbs (chives) and bori pieces (sundried ground lentil nuggets or dumplings)
- Nga Thongba, traditional Meitei fish curry
- Sana Thongba, traditional Meitei cheese curry
- Tharoi Thongba, traditional Meitei snail curry
- Yen Thongba, traditional Meitei chicken curry
