= Tan ngang =

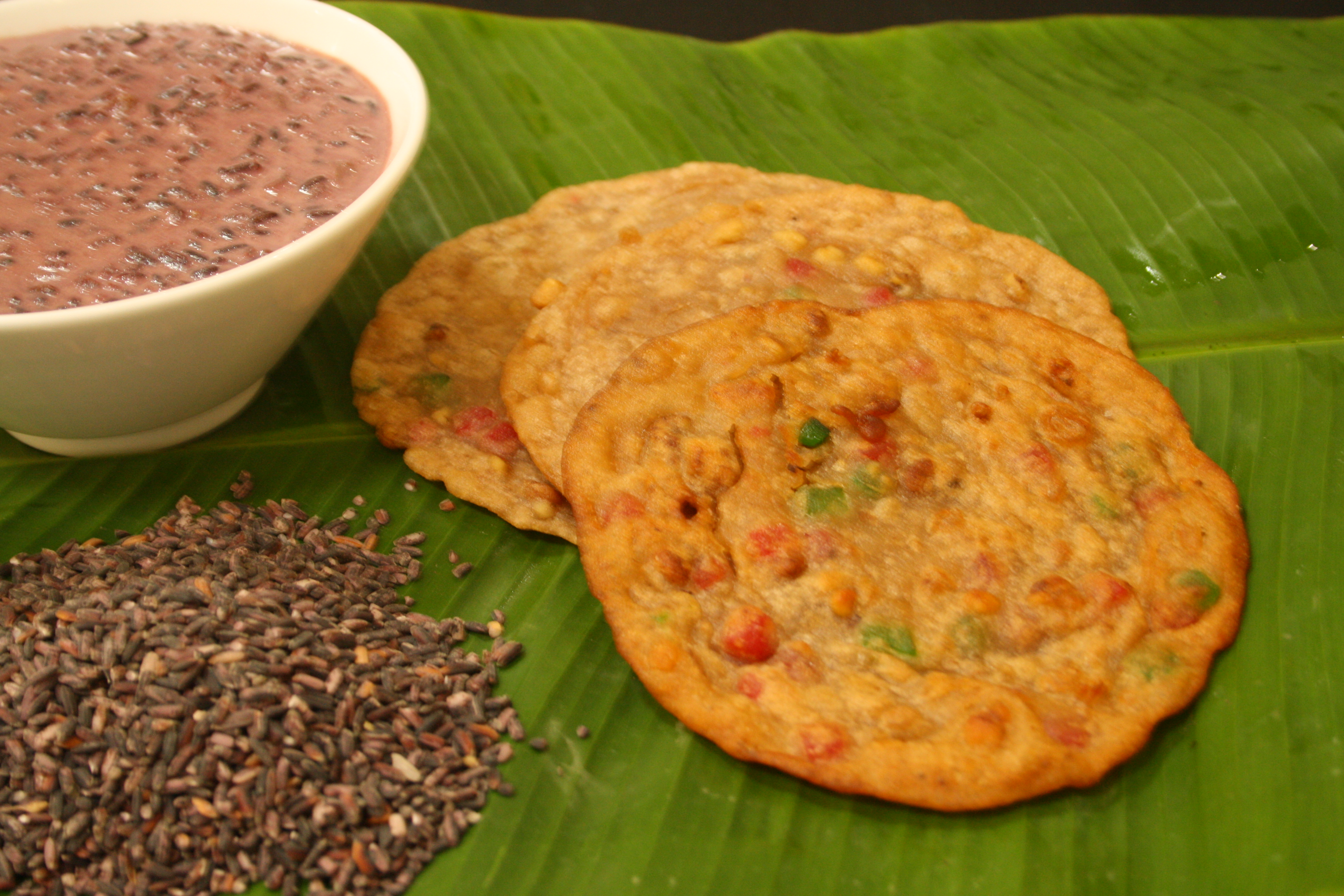
Tan Ngang

Tan Ngang (ꯇꯟ ꯉꯥꯡ), also known as Tan Angangba (ꯇꯟ ꯑꯉꯥꯡꯕ), is a traditional fried bread from the Meitei cuisine of Manipur, northeast India. It is made with refined flour, commonly called maida, and curd. Tan Ngang is similar to the Indian puri and is often served with curries such as Sana Thongpa or Keli Chana, particularly for breakfast.

== Ingredients ==
The main ingredients of Tan Ngang are one cup of all-purpose flour (maida), two tablespoons of thick yogurt or hung curd, salt to taste, and water as needed for kneading. Oil is required for deep frying the bread.

== Preparation ==
To prepare Tan Ngang, the flour and salt are first combined in a bowl. Yogurt is then added, and the mixture is gradually kneaded with water to form a soft, non-sticky dough. The dough is divided into small portions, which are rolled into balls and flattened into circles about three inches in diameter.

Oil is heated in a pan or kadai for deep frying. Each flattened dough circle is gently placed into the hot oil. Using a slotted spoon, the puri is lightly pressed and hot oil is poured on top while moving it in a circular motion. This causes the bread to puff up. Once puffed, it is flipped to the other side and fried until it turns golden brown. It is important not to fry the puri for more than two minutes to prevent it from becoming brittle.

After frying, the Tan Ngang is removed from the oil and drained on a kitchen towel. The process is repeated for the remaining dough until all the puris are cooked.

== Serving ==
Tan Ngang is traditionally served hot. It is commonly accompanied by Manipuri dishes such as Sana Thongba or other curries like Kala Desi Chana. It is especially popular as a breakfast dish.

== See also ==
- Chamthong
- Maroi Bori Thongba
- Nga Thongba
- Tharoi Thongba
- Yen Thongba
