= Yen thongba =

Meitei method of cooking chicken

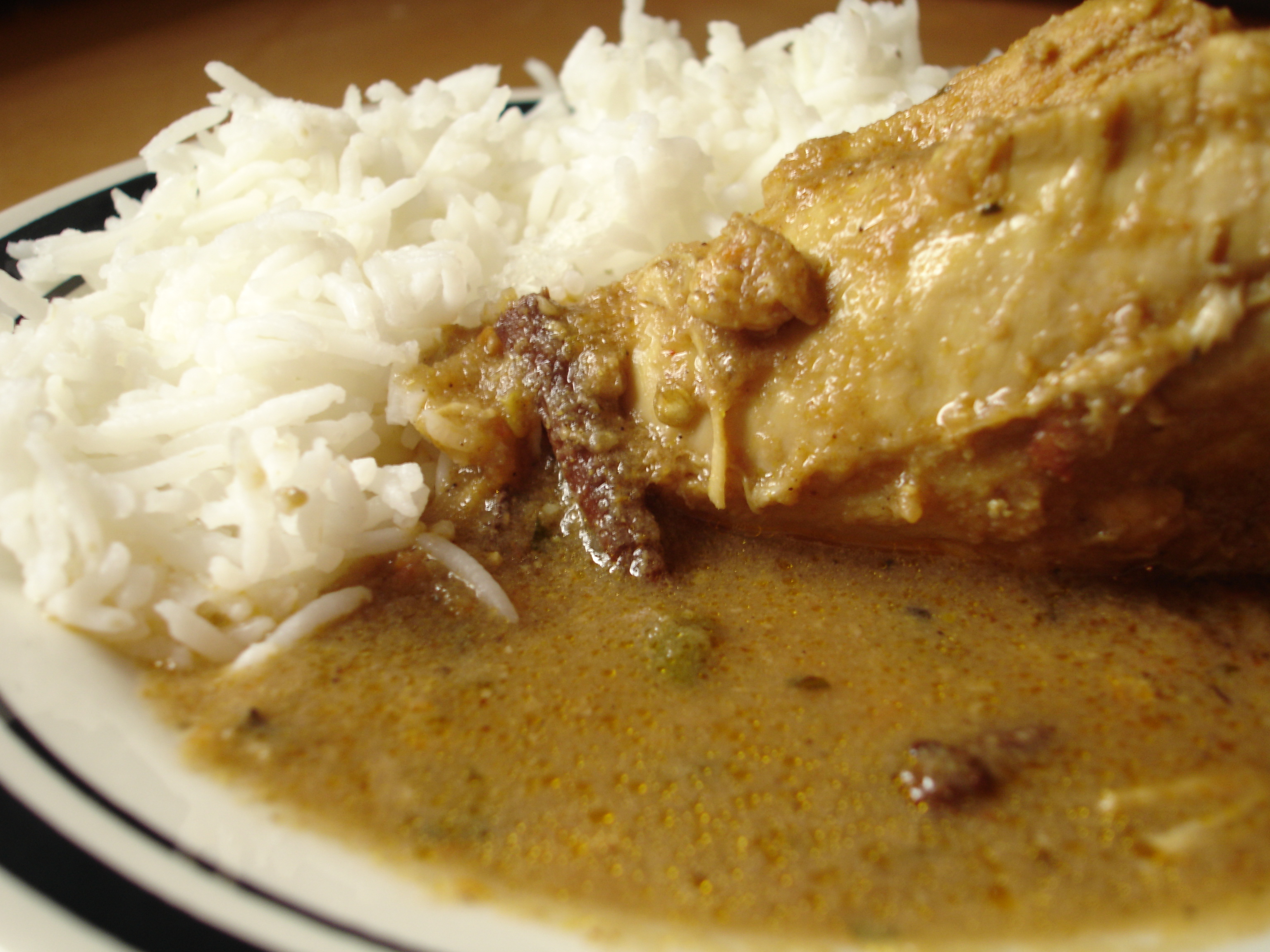
Chicken is usually served with rice

Yen Thongba (ꯌꯦꯟ ꯊꯣꯡꯕ) is a traditional Meitei method of cooking chicken. It is a type of chicken curry that is regarded as the most typical preparation of chicken in the traditional Meitei culinary practice. The dish is known for its rich flavor and distinctive taste.

The dish can be prepared using different types of chicken, including Meetei Yen (Meitei chicken), broilers, koilers (kuroiler), and layers. When it is specifically prepared using Meetei Yen, it is referred to as Meetei Yen Thongba.

Yen Thongba is considered best when prepared with country fowl. A key ingredient in this curry is Awa Phadigom, also known as Mexican coriander or culantro. The use of this herb gives the dish a characteristic flavor that distinguishes it from other chicken curries. The proportions of ingredients may be adjusted according to preference. The level of spiciness and the consistency of the gravy, whether more soupy or dry, can be modified as desired.

Yen Thongba is commonly served during festivals and social gatherings in the traditional Meitei community. It is prepared for occasions such as Ningol Chakouba feasts, annual convention feasts, and culinary competitions, including chef contests.

== Ingredients ==
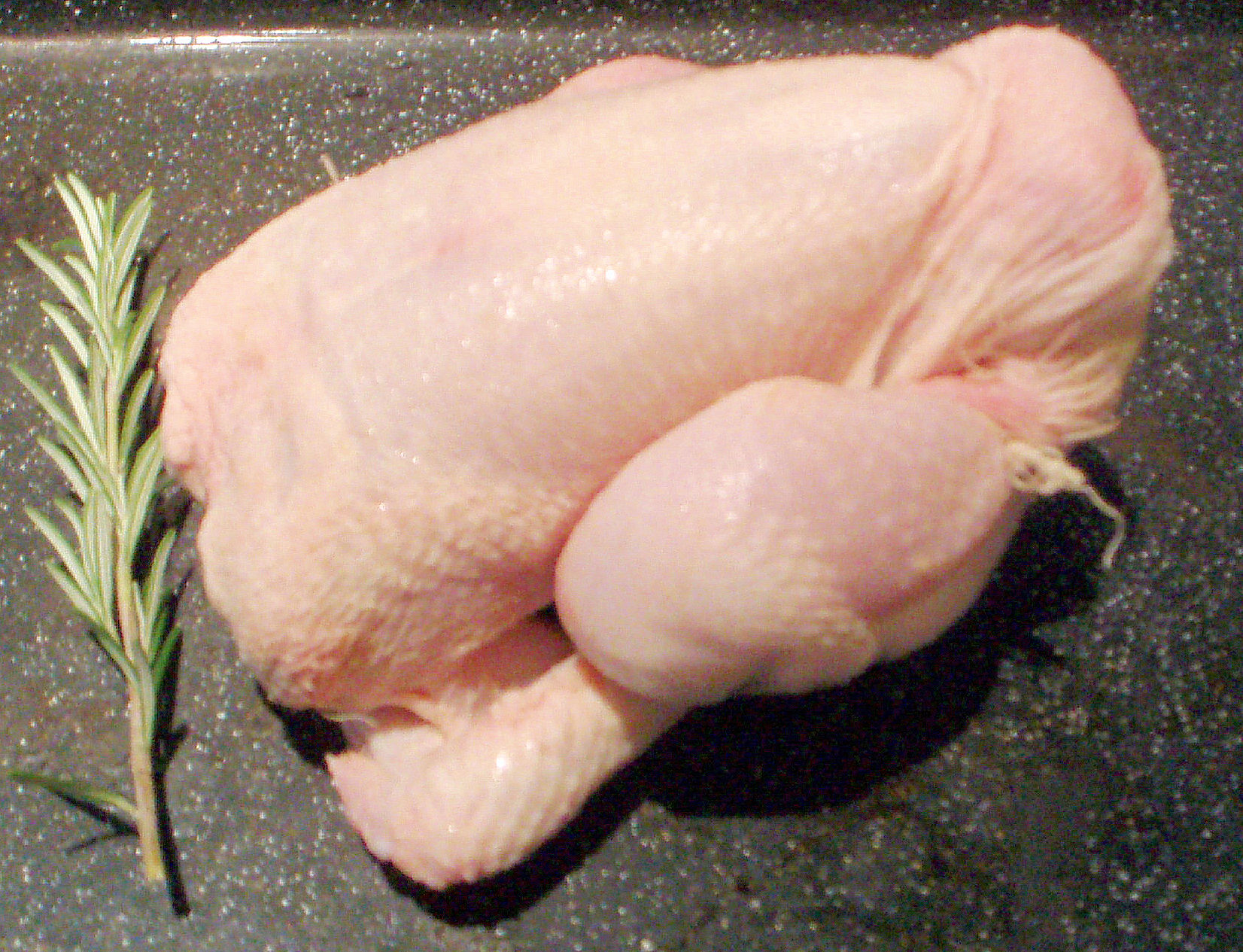
Fresh chicken flesh is prepared with the herbs and spices

Yen Thongba is prepared using country fowl cut into medium pieces, along with salt and turmeric powder for seasoning. Green chillies, garlic cloves, and fresh ginger are used to create a spice base. Onions are made into a paste, and tomatoes are finely chopped. Potatoes are cut into halves and included in the curry.

Whole spices such as cumin seeds, coriander seeds, fennel seeds, bay leaf, cinnamon stick, and green cardamom are used. Mustard oil serves as the cooking medium. Awa Phadigom leaves and fresh coriander leaves are added to enhance aroma and flavor. Water is added as needed during cooking.

== Preparation ==
Garlic, green chillies, and ginger are crushed together in a mortar and pestle to form a semi-fine paste. The chicken is washed and mixed with salt and turmeric powder. The crushed spice mixture and a portion of mustard oil are added to the chicken, and the pieces are coated evenly. The marinated chicken is then kept aside for thirty minutes.

The potatoes are seasoned with salt and turmeric powder and set aside. Coriander seeds and cumin seeds are dry roasted and ground into powder.

Mustard oil is heated in a pan. The potatoes are shallow fried until light brown on both sides and then removed. In the same oil, a bay leaf is added and fried briefly until fragrant. Fennel seeds are then added, followed by onion paste, which is fried until it begins to turn brown.

The marinated chicken is added to the pan and cooked over medium to low heat until the oil begins to separate. Chopped tomatoes and the fried potatoes are then added and mixed well. The roasted coriander and cumin powder are added, along with a small amount of water to allow even cooking.

The curry is simmered until the chicken and potatoes are fully cooked and oil rises to the surface. Cardamom and cinnamon are ground into a fine powder and added to the curry. The heat is then turned off. Awa Phadigom leaves and fresh coriander leaves are added on top, and the dish is covered and left to rest for at least thirty minutes before serving.

== Serving ==
Yen Thongba is traditionally served with rice.

== See also ==
- Chamthong
- Maroi Bori Thongba
- Nga Thongba
- Sana Thongba
- Tan Angangba
- Tharoi Thongba
- Kaunayen chicken
- Singju
- Kabok
