= Gohona Bori =

Dried dal dumpling

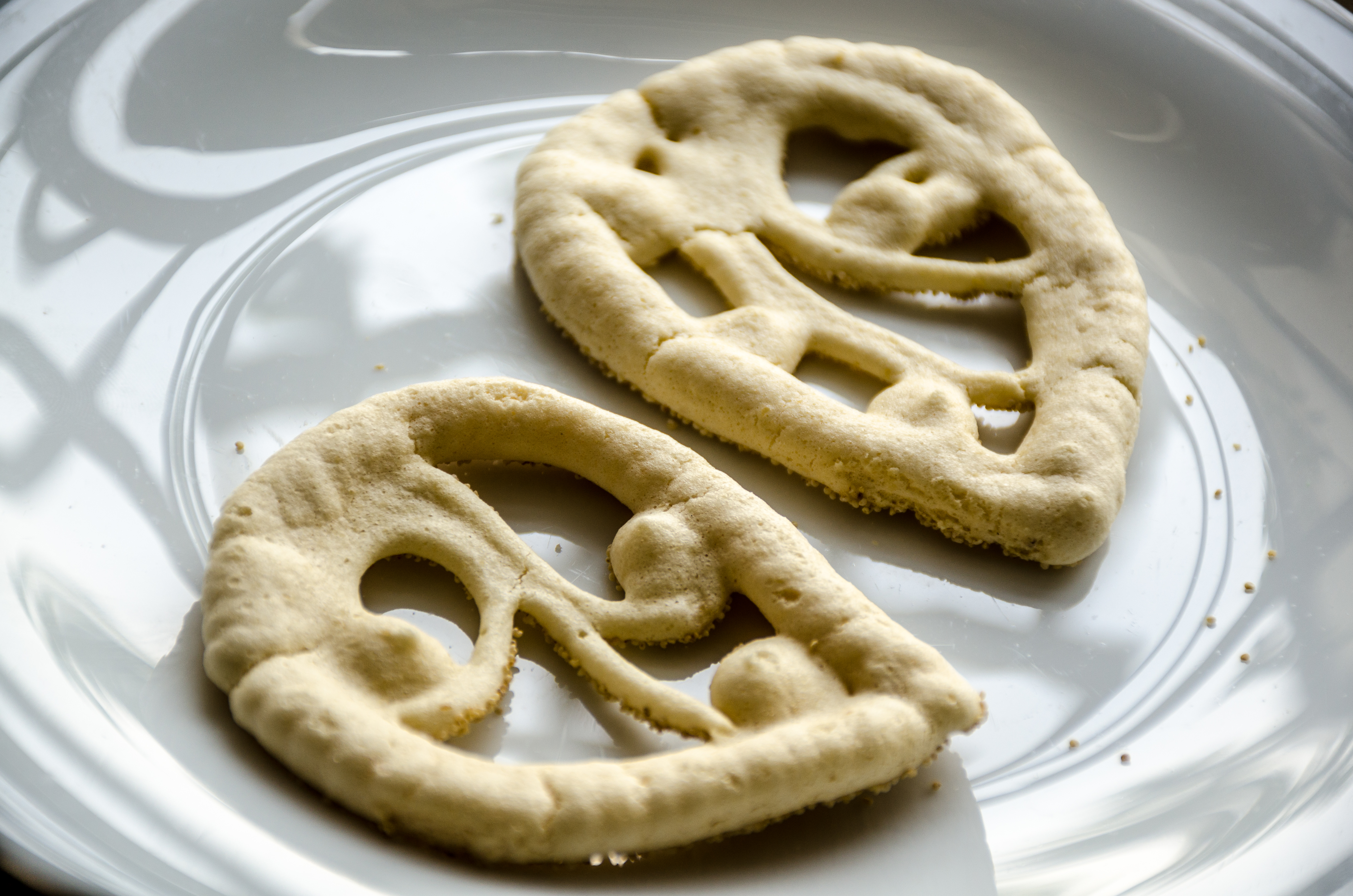
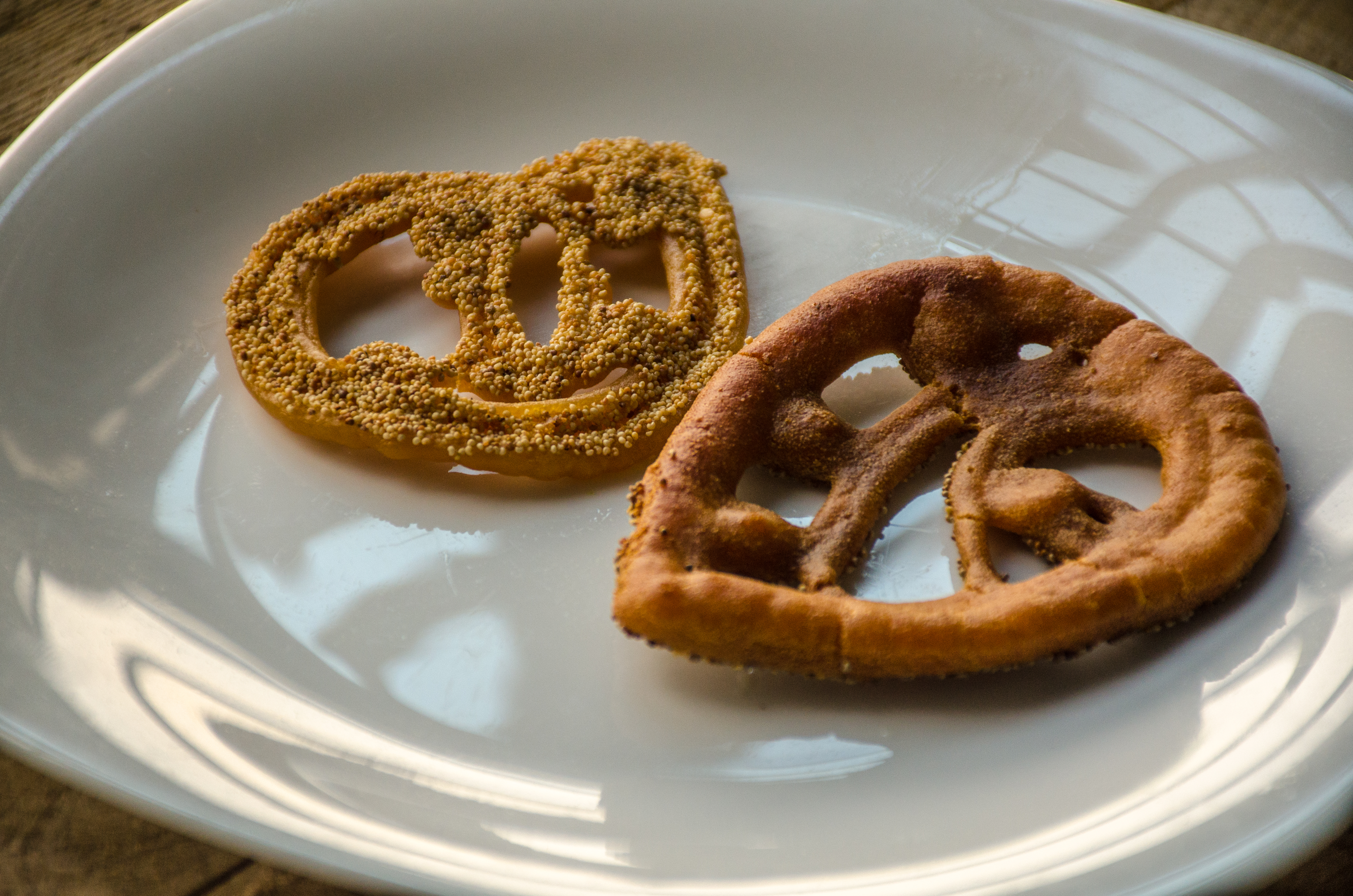
- Gohona Bori
- Alternative names: Naksha Bori, Jilipi Bori
- Type: Dumpling
- Place of origin: India
- Region or state: Purba Medinipur, West Bengal
- Associated cuisine: India
- Main ingredients: Cowpea, Poppy seed and various type of Spices
- Variations: Bori

Gohona Bori (Bengali: গহনা বড়ি) is a dried dal dumpling. It is popular in Bengali cuisine. It is a well known food item in Purba Medinipur. It is also known as Naksha Bori. It is made with black lentil, Poppy seed and various spices. In 2016, IIT Kharagpur applied to get the geographical Indication for Gohona Bori.

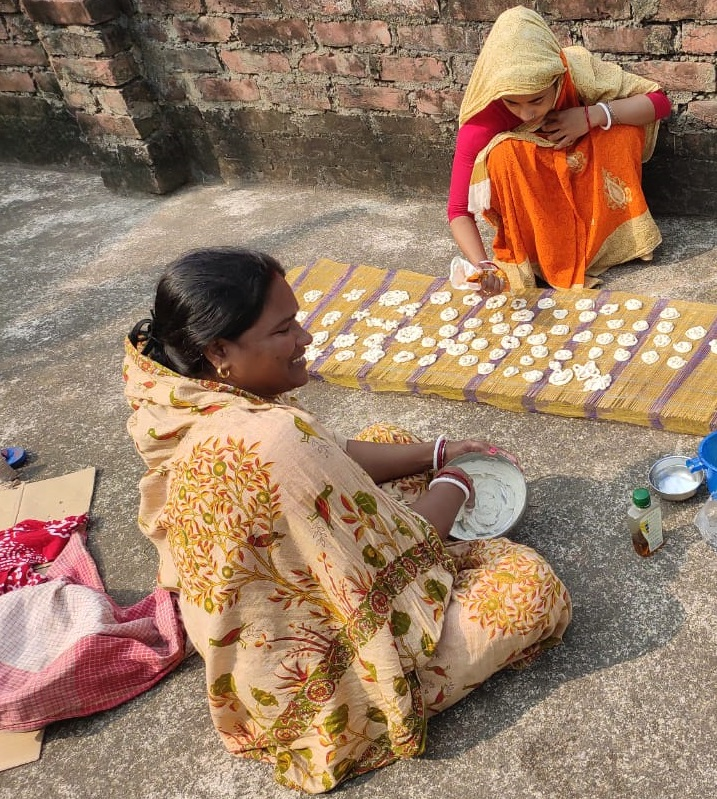
Making of Gohona Bori

== History ==
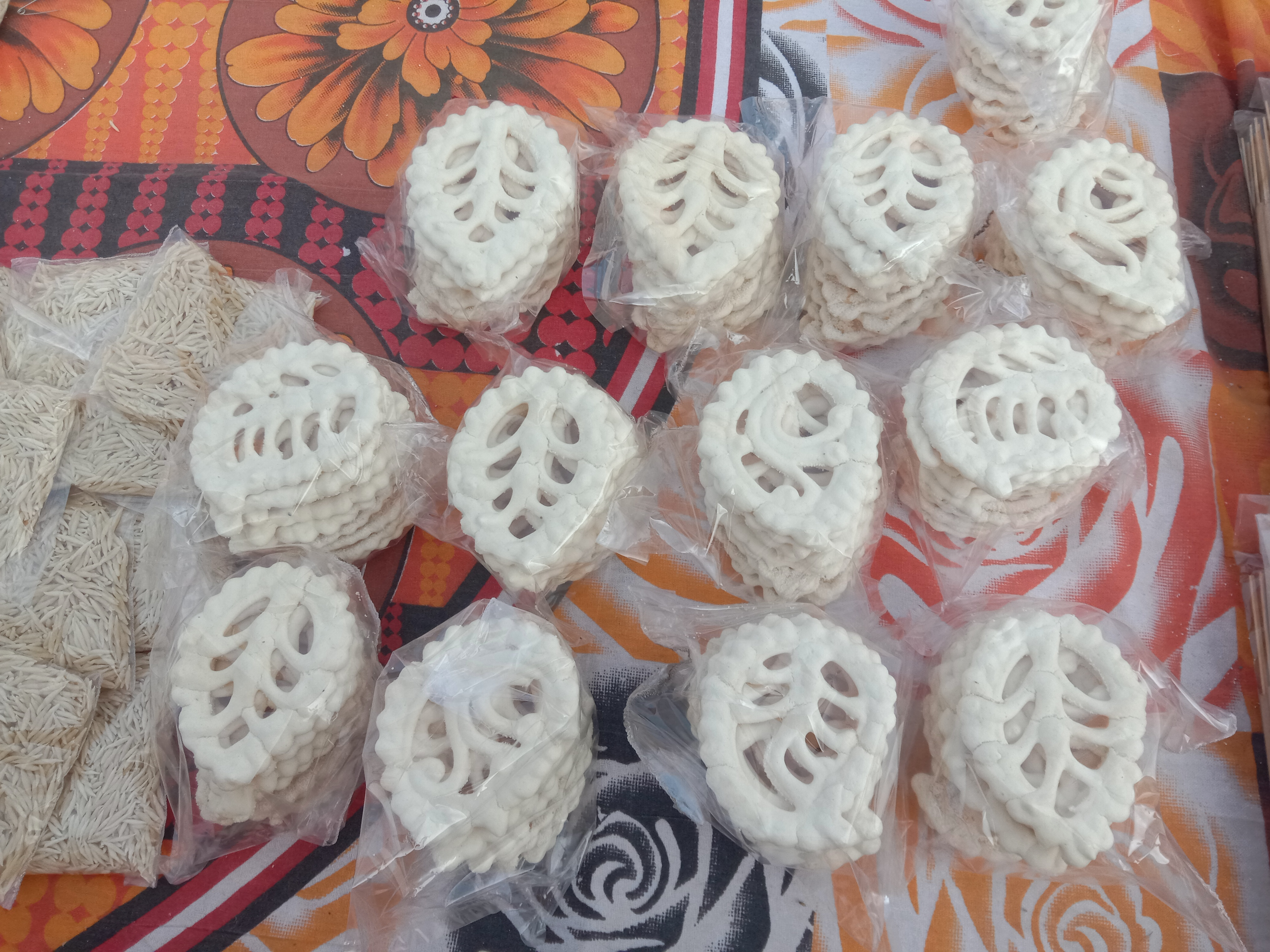
Gohona bori for sale at a shop in ECO Park 'State Handicrafts Fair', in New Town, Kolkata.

It is an age-old dish of Bengal. Before the arrival of the British in India, poppy seed was not used in Gohona Bori. After the Battle of Palashi, the British discovered a market of illegal opium in China. British forced the farmers of the Rarh region of Bengal to cultivate poppy and extorting large amounts of opium from them into China. Poppy seeds were dropped after the opiate was extracted. In the past, poppy seeds became the cooking material of Bankura, Birbhum, Bardhaman and Midnapore districts. Thus the poppy seeds are used in Gohona Bori in Midnapore.

In 1930, Seba Maiti, a student of Shantiniketan presented Gohona Bori to Rabindranath Tagore which was made by her mother, Hirnmayi Debi, and grandmother, Sheratakumari Debi. Tagore was so attracted to Bori that he wrote them a letter seeking permission to preserve the photographs of Gohona Bori at the Art Building of Shantiniketan. As a result, Gohona Bori gained popularity as a sign of art. Rabindranath Tagore considered it to be an art. So he considered the thought of baking it or eating it was considered an act of destruction. He noted a similarity with historical artwork and arranged an exhibition. Nandalal Bose described it as a jewel of the Bengali mother's jewelry box. He expressed his desire to publish a book on it.

Gohona Bori were exhibited in the 59th session of Indian National Congress held in Kalyani in 1954. In 1990, the West Bengal government took part in a food festival organized by the women of Tamluk's Gohona Bori makers. They prepared Gohona Bori in front of an audience of thousands in Kolkata. In 1995 a Gohona Bori marketing group was established in Tamluk.

== Design ==
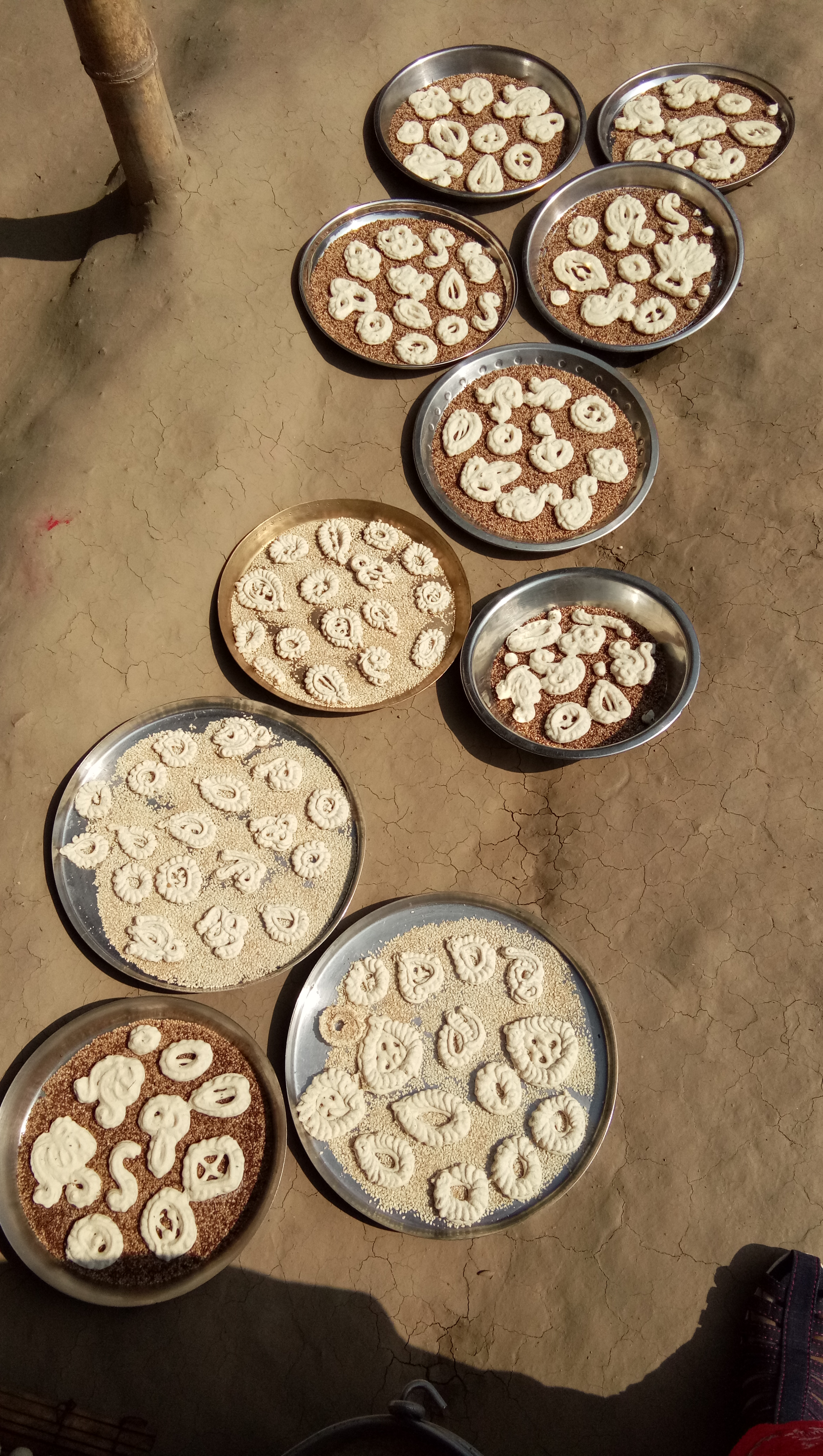
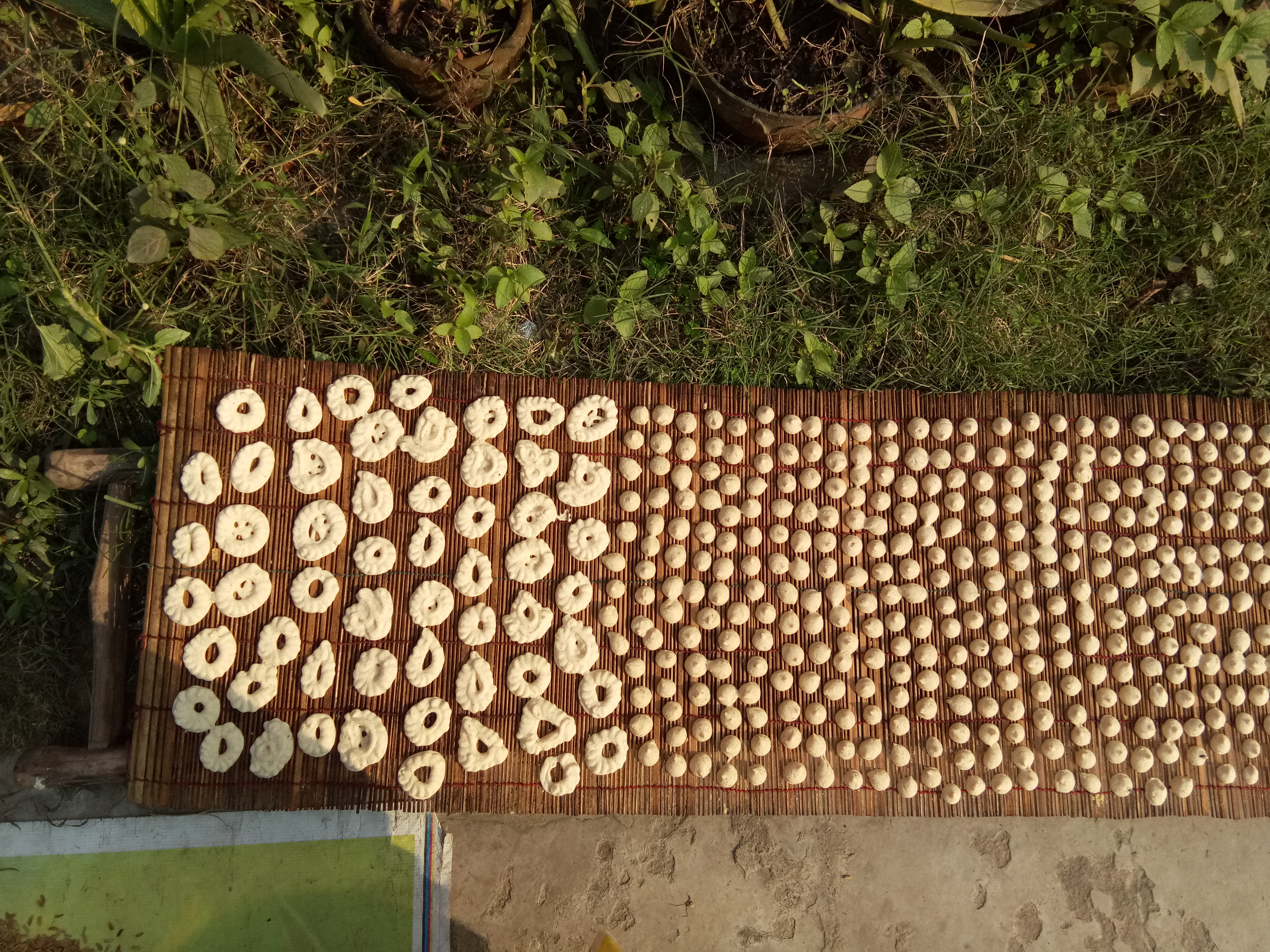
Gohona Boris are being made

Each cook chooses their own design. Triangles, circles and squares are common along with other geometric designs such as shells, lotus, cats, cactus, peacock, owls, poultry and butterflies .
