= Bori (food) =

Lentil dumpling popular in Bengali cuisine

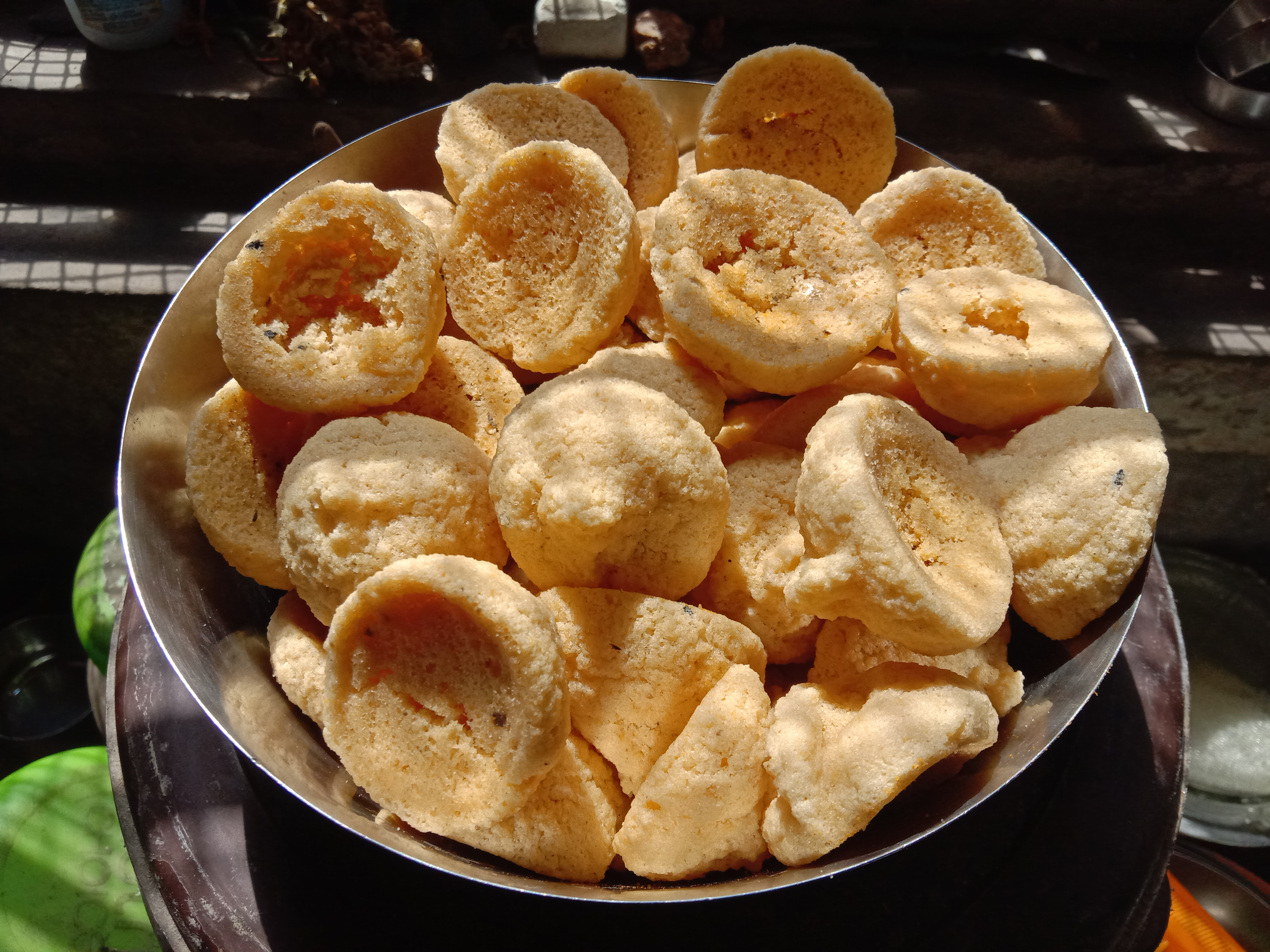
- Biuli daler bori (dried lentil dumplings)
- Type: Dumpling
- Place of origin: India
- Region or state: Purba Medinipur, West Bengal
- Associated cuisine: India
- Main ingredients: Cowpea, dal, poppy seed and other spices
- Variations: Gohona bori

Bori (Bengali: বড়ি) is a form of dried lentil dumplings popular in Bengali cuisine. It is made from a paste of urad dal and winter melon which is sun-dried for 3–5 days. Once fully dried, it can easily last for about a year.

== Recipe ==
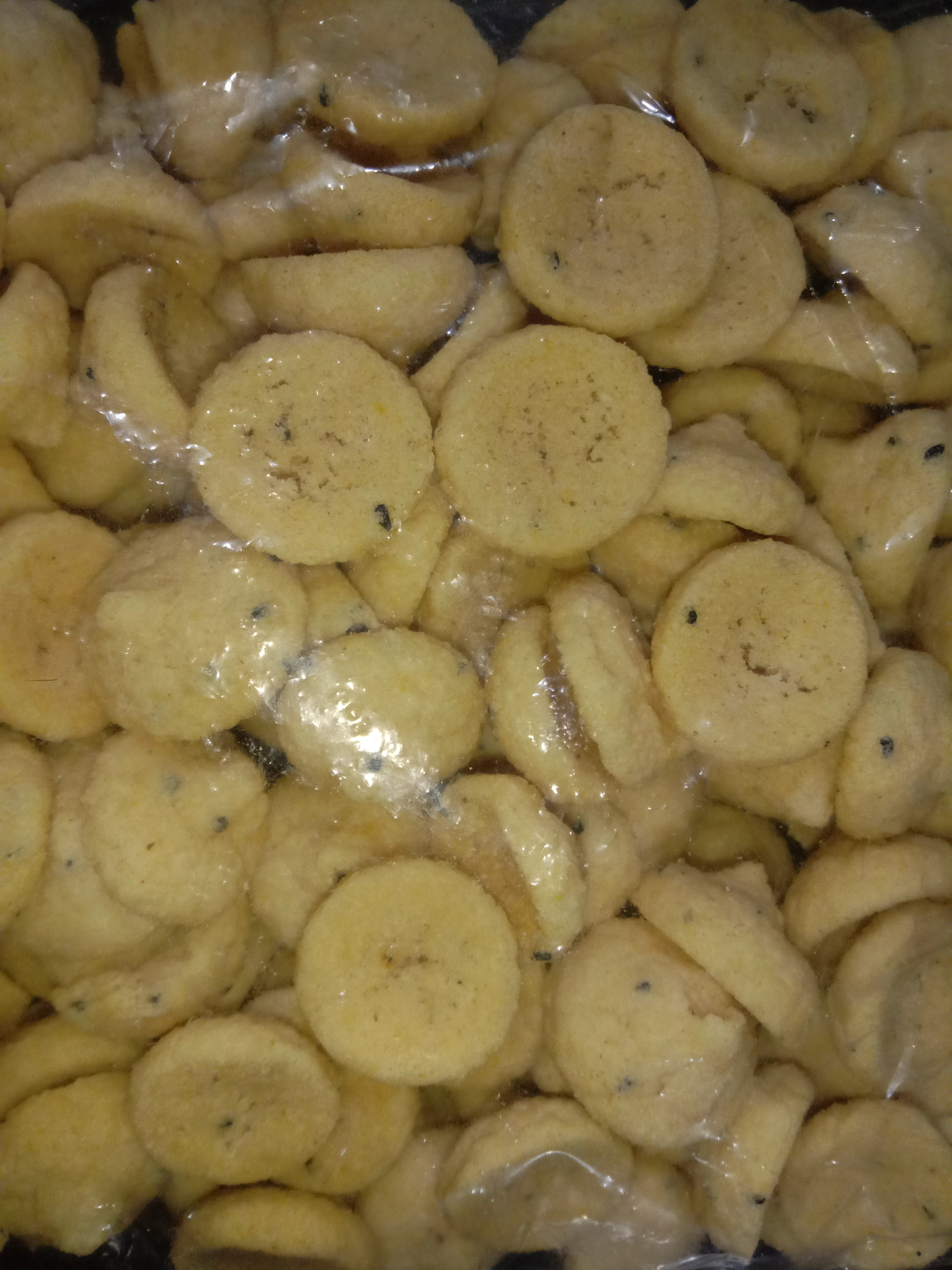
'Biulir daler bori' in Kolkata, West Bengal.

The paste is laid out by hand on a mat in the sunlight. It sticks to the mat while wet but when the bori dries completely it can easily come off. In its simplest form bori takes the conical shape naturally occurring due to the way the paste is laid out.

Intricate artistic designs can also made with the paste when squeezed out through a piping bag. This is called naksha bori. It is also called gohona bori or gayna bori because the designs often look like those of jewellery (gahana or gayna is Bengali for jewellery). To avoid breaking naksha bori when removing from the mat, a layer of poppy seeds is spread before laying the paste. The district of Purba Medinipur is famous for its naksha bori. Preparing bori is almost exclusively done by women of the household, sometimes assisted by children. Contrary to the common notion, it is not grown on trees.

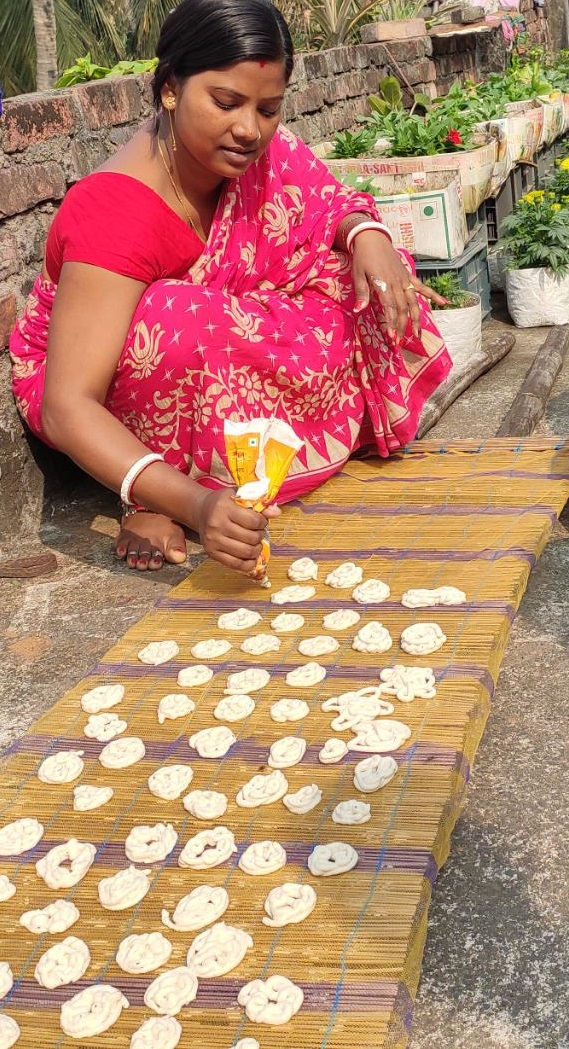
Bori making

== Consumption ==
Bori can be fried and eaten as a snack or can be added to fish or vegetable dishes.

== See also ==
- Bori Thongba
- Masaura
- Soya chunks
