= Tharoi thongba =

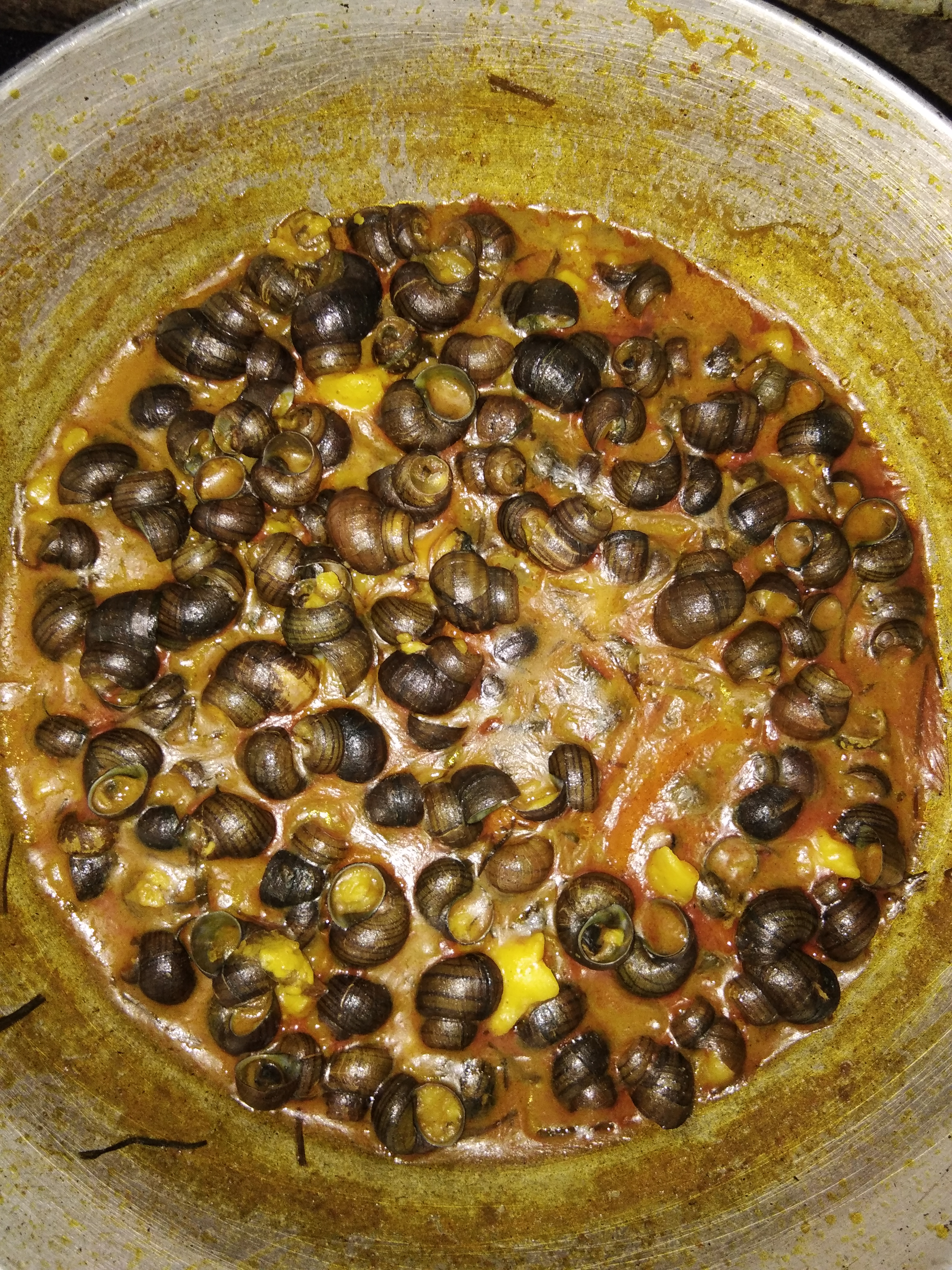
Tharoi Thongba

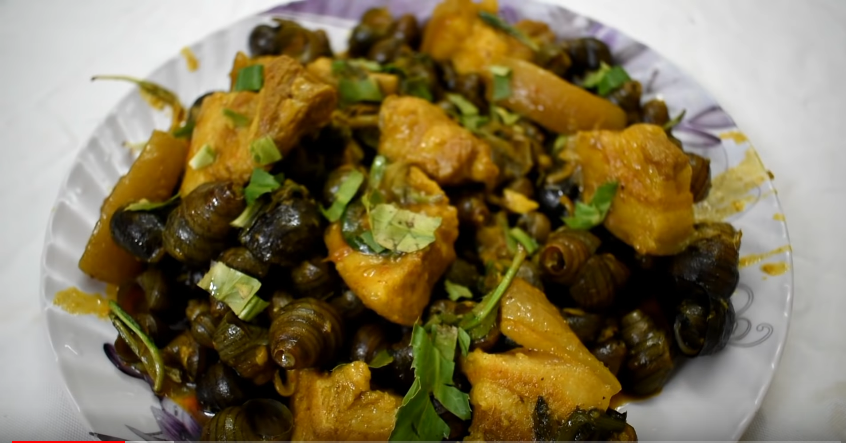
Tharoi Thongba and pork mixture

Tharoi Thongba (ꯊꯔꯣꯏ ꯊꯣꯡꯕ) is a traditional Meitei snail curry from the Meitei cuisine of Manipur. In the Meitei language, tharoi means snail and thongba means curry. It is known as an aromatic and flavorful dish. It is commonly eaten as a main course and is usually served with steamed rice.

Tharoi Thongba is commonly served during festivals and social gatherings in the traditional Meitei community. It is prepared for occasions such as Yaoshang feasts, Sangai festival, International Food Festival, Chinjak festival, and other special events.

== Ingredients ==
=== Main ingredients ===
The main ingredient of Tharoi Thongba is tharoi, which refers to river snails. These are freshwater mollusks that give the dish a unique and earthy flavor. There are three types of snail usually eaten in Manipur, namely Lai Tharoi, Loubuk Tharoi, and Tharoi Ningkhabi. Scientifically, Loubuk Tharoi is called Angulyagra oxytropis, Ningkhabi Tharoi is Bellamya crassa, and Lai Tharoi is Thiara tuberculate.

The snails are cooked in a rich and savory curry prepared with traditional spices, herbs, and other aromatic ingredients. The snails absorb the flavors of the broth and become tender. The dish is regarded as an important part of Manipuri culinary heritage. Although it is not scientifically proven, it is said that consuming tharoi can cure anaemia.

=== Common ingredients ===
Although the ingredients used along with tharoi may differ from region to region, the basic method of preparation remains mostly the same. Tharoi is commonly cooked with potatoes, galangal (Loklei), and smoked fish. Some people also prepare it with fermented bamboo shoot (Soibum), while others cook it with pumpkin (Mairen).

The leaves of Zanthoxylum acanthopodium, known as mukthrubi in Meitei, are considered a compulsory ingredient in this cuisine. If these leaves are not added, the smell of the dish reduces its palatability. Sometimes the fruit cover, or pericarp, of Zanthoxylum rhetsa is added to enhance the flavor.

Other leaves and ingredients that may be used include leaves of Zanthoxylum armatum, rhizome of Hedychium coronarium, species of Amomum, leaves of Eryngium foetidum, leaves of Allium porum, leaves of Allium hookeri, garlic, and onion.

=== Primary ingredients ===
The primary ingredients commonly used in Tharoi Thongba include 500 grams or one mug of snail (tharoi). A small bunch of Sichuan pepper leaves, also known as Prickly Winged leaves (Mukthrubi Mana), is a compulsory ingredient. About 250 grams or three pieces of galangal (Loklei), sliced into long pieces, are also compulsory, although they may be replaced with ginger lily root (Takhellei maru). The recipe includes five pieces of fermented fish (Ngari), ten to fifteen red chillies, one roughly chopped onion, one bulb of finely crushed garlic, and two thumb-sized pieces of finely crushed ginger. It also uses one teaspoon of coriander seed powder, one teaspoon of cumin seed powder, one tablespoon of refined oil, two to three bay leaves, salt as required, one medium-sized chopped potato, and five to ten leaves of citrus leaf or Burmese coriander (Awa Fadigom).

== Preparation of snails ==
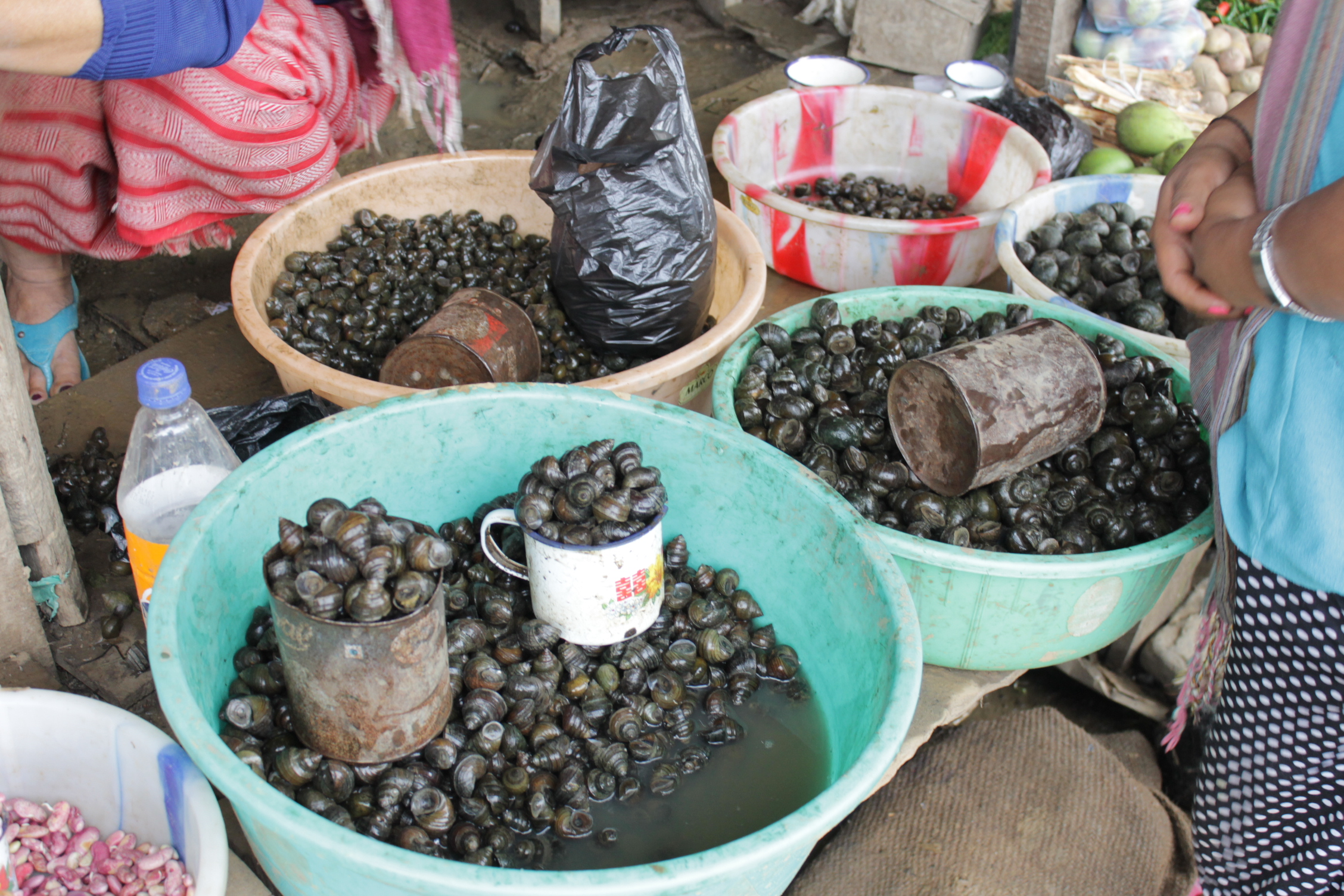
Tharoi or snails being sold at a marketplace in Manipur

Cooking tharoi requires prior planning. The snails must be bought at least two days before cooking and kept soaked with some grains of rice. This process helps remove mud, debris, and baby snails from inside the shells. The front and back ends of the snails are cut one day before cooking, or at least three to four hours before. They are then soaked in salted water.

After soaking, the snails must be washed at least eight to ten times, or until the water becomes clear. Fresh snails are usually soaked overnight in salted water and washed properly to remove dirt particles and mud.

There are specific seasons for preparing this dish. It cannot be consumed during the rainy season. However, it is available in food stalls and hotels.

== Cooking method using whole snails ==
In one method, the snails are placed in a pressure cooker with half a cup of water and cooked on high flame. Potato, loklei, and red chillies are placed in a small bowl inside the cooker. After the cooker whistles, the flame is reduced to medium and the contents are cooked for five minutes. The cooker is not opened until the pressure reduces naturally.

At the same time, fermented fish (ngari) is roasted in a pan until it becomes soft and slightly brown. It is then placed in a small bowl with a small amount of water to soften it. Alternatively, the ngari may be added directly into the pressure cooker along with the red chillies. These two methods produce slightly different tastes.

After opening the cooker, the vegetables are removed and allowed to cool. The chillies are separated and mashed with ngari and salt to prepare a chilli-ngari paste. The vegetables are mashed and mixed with this paste along with three cups of water to create the curry base.

The snails are drained and dry-fried in a wok or skillet until the moisture that seeps out dries completely. This process makes them crunchy later. In another pot, oil is heated and bay leaves are added first. Chopped onion, crushed garlic, and crushed ginger are then stir-fried together with cumin powder and coriander seed powder until the mixture becomes golden brown. The curry base is added and boiled for one minute. After this, three to four cups of water are added and brought to a boil.

The snails and mukthrubi mana leaves are then added and cooked on high flame for another ten to fifteen minutes. Salt is added according to taste, and coriander leaves may also be added. Fresh leaves of Zanthoxylum acanthopodium are added when the curry begins to boil.

In another variation, the whole snails are fried in edible oil along with chopped onion or leaves of Allium porum before being cooked with a proper quantity of water.

== Alternative preparation ==
=== Tharoi Angouba ===
In another preparation method, the outer shell of the snail is broken and removed. The flesh is then deep-fried in oil along with leaves of Allium hookeri and garlic. This preparation is known as Tharoi Angouba. It is commonly sold by street food vendors.

== Variations ==
In some versions of Tharoi Thongba, freshwater snails are fried in edible oil and then cooked in a spicy sauce prepared with local spices such as leaves of Zanthoxylum armatum, rhizome of Hedychium coronarium, and species of Amomum. The pericarp of Zanthoxylum rhetsa and leaves of Eryngium foetidum are sometimes added during preparation.

== Cultural beliefs ==
Certain Meitei villagers prepare a snail curry known as Lai Tharoi Thongba one day before a festival and eat it at dinner. There is a belief that eating this snail curry helps ward off smallpox. The disease is believed to be common during the month of Sajiphu, which falls in April and May in the traditional Meitei calendar. Although the disease may occur in other months, special emphasis is given to eating the snail dish during Sajiphu.

== Serving ==
Tharoi Thongba is usually served as a main course. It is commonly eaten with steamed rice, which allows the flavors of the curry to blend with the rice.

== See also ==
- Snails as food
- Chamthong
- Maroi Bori Thongba
- Nga Thongba
- Sana Thongba
- Tan Ngang
- Yen Thongba
