= Nga thongba =

Meitei fish curry

Nga Thongba
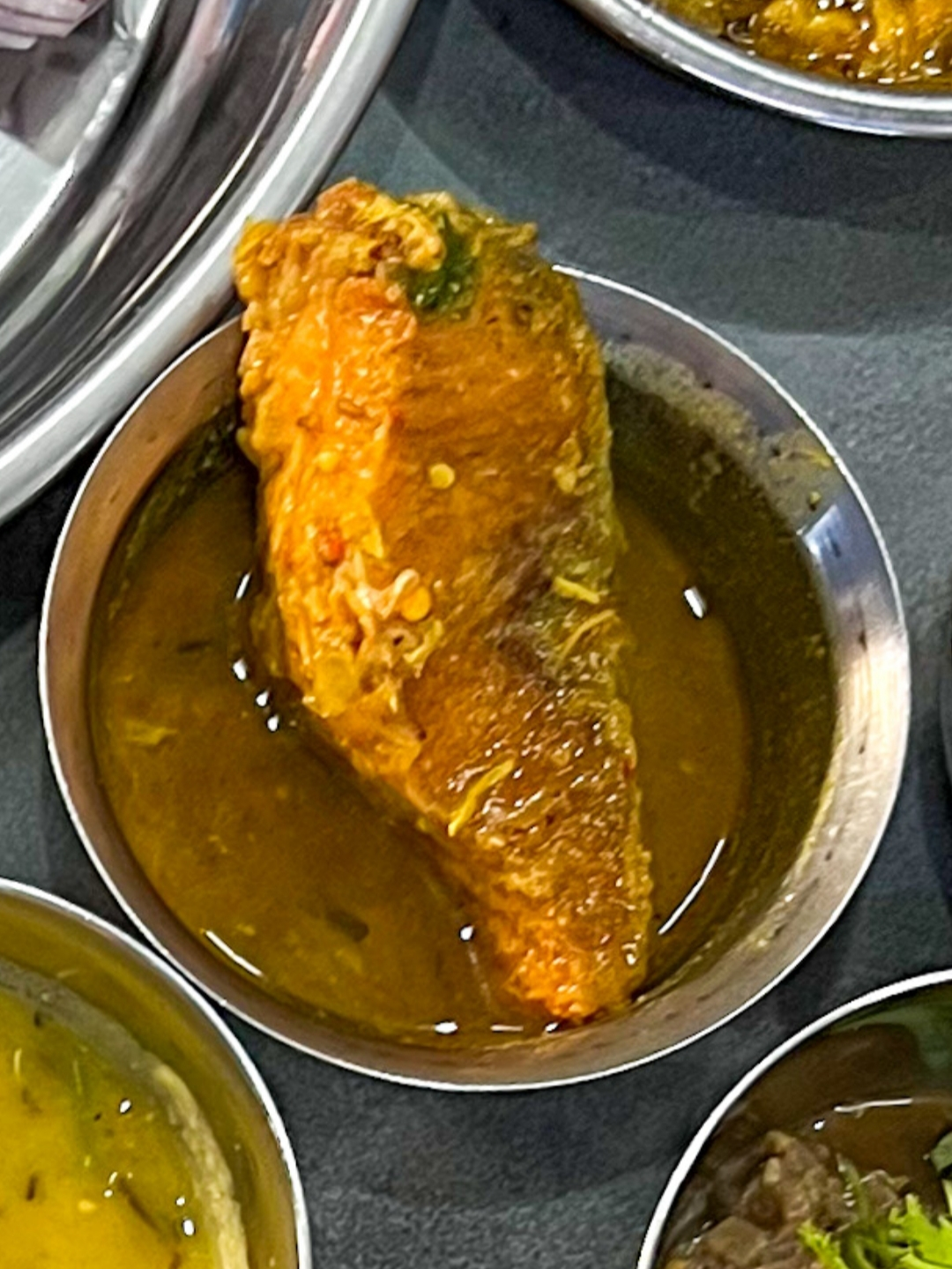
- Taothong (Nga Ataoba Thongba) - a type of Nga Thongba
- Alternative names: ꯉꯥ ꯊꯣꯡꯕ
- Type: fish curry
- Place of origin: Manipur
- Region or state: indigenous (Northeast India, Bangladesh, (Note: There is a significant indigenous population of Meitei people in Bangladesh.) Myanmar, (Note: There is a significant indigenous population of Meitei people in Myanmar.)) & Meitei diaspora (the United States, the United Kingdom, South Korea)
- Associated cuisine: Meitei cuisine
- Variations: Nga Ataoba Thongba (Nga Taothong) & Nga Atoiba Thongba (Nga Toithong)
- Similar dishes: Chamthong, Yen Thongba, Sana Thongba, Tharoi Thongba

Nga Thongba (Meitei: ꯉꯥ ꯊꯣꯡꯕ) is a fish curry of traditional Meitei cuisine, of Manipur. It is a staple freshwater fish dish in Meitei households. Its distinctive flavor comes from a combination of herbs, spices, and citrus fruit called heiribob, native to Manipur.

Nga Thongba is commonly served during festivals and social gatherings in the traditional Meitei community. It is prepared for occasions such as Ningol Chakouba feasts, Cheiraoba feasts, Yaoshang feasts, annual convention feasts, culinary competitions, including chef contests, and other special events.

== Naming variations ==
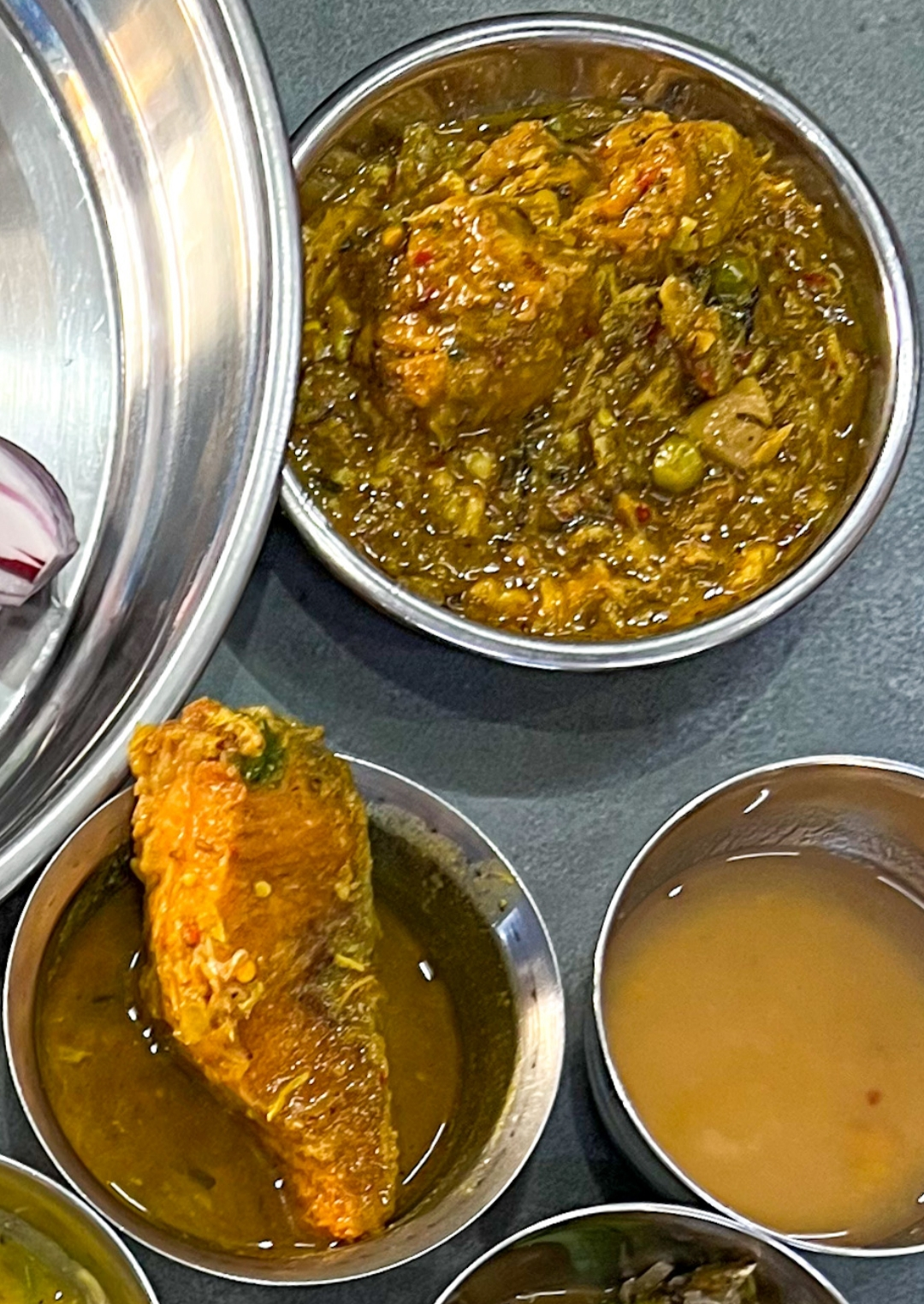
2 types of Nga Thongba (fish curry) - Toithong (Nga Atoiba Thongba) & Taothong (Nga Ataoba Thongba)

Nga Thongba has several variations and is known by different names. One style is called Nga Atoiba Thongba, also known as Nga Atoi Thongba or Nga Toithong (transl. "mashed fish stew" or "disintegrated fish curry"). Another style is called Nga Ataoba Thongba, which is also referred to as Nga Atao Thongba or Nga Taothong (transl. fried fish curry). These names reflect slight differences in preparation methods within traditional Meitei cuisine.

== Ingredients ==
=== Main ingredients ===
The main ingredients for Nga Thongba include freshwater fish cut into small to medium pieces, onions, green chillies, Mexican coriander leaves (culantro), hooker chives with roots, heiribob (sun-dried or fresh citrus peel), ginger-garlic paste, turmeric powder, coriander powder, coarsely ground red chilli (kutti mirch), mustard oil, salt, green peas, and asafoetida. Potatoes may be added optionally.

=== Tempering ingredients ===
Tempering is prepared separately using mustard oil, dried red chillies, garlic chives, hooker chives, cumin seeds, turmeric powder, and a small amount of asafoetida.

== Preparation ==
The fish is first washed thoroughly and drained. Vegetables and herbs are cleaned, chopped, and set aside. Mustard oil is heated in a kadhai or wok, and cumin seeds are added to release aroma. Onions are sautéed until soft, followed by ginger-garlic paste and hooker chives. Spices such as turmeric, coriander powder, and coarsely ground red chilli are incorporated into the base.

Fish pieces are added to the pan and cooked over low to medium heat. Water, green peas, heiribob, and optional potatoes are added to form the curry. The tempering is prepared in a separate pan and added to the simmering curry. The dish is cooked further to blend the flavors, then garnished with Mexican coriander leaves before serving.

== Serving variations ==
Nga Thongba is traditionally served with plain steamed rice. Substitutions can be made for ingredients that are not widely available; spring onions may replace hooker chives, and regular coriander may replace Mexican coriander leaves, though this may alter the flavor. The quantity of coarsely ground red chilli can be adjusted according to taste preferences.

== See also ==
- Chamthong Thongba
- Maroi Bori Thongba
- Sana Thongba
- Tharoi Thongba
- Yen Thongba
- Meitei Nganu
- Kaunayen chicken
- Fish in Meitei culture
- Fishing in Meitei culture
