= Sana thongba =

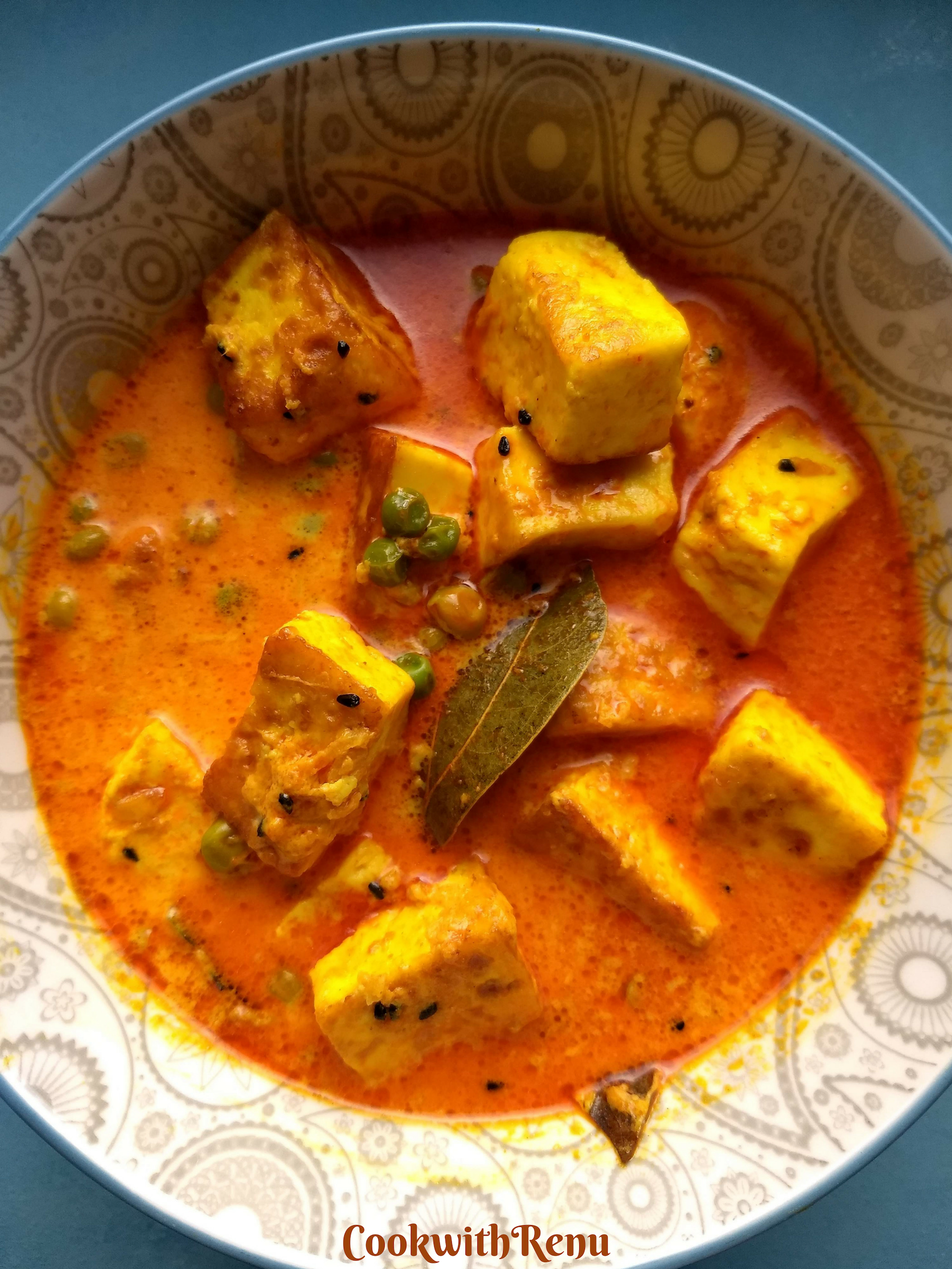
Sana Thongba

Sana Thongba (ꯁꯅꯥ ꯊꯣꯡꯕ), also known as Sana Thongpa (ꯁꯅꯥ ꯊꯣꯡꯄ), is a traditional cheese curry of Meitei cuisine from Manipur in northeastern India. The term sana refers to cottage cheese or paneer, and thongba refers to curry in the Meitei language. The dish is commonly included in the vegetarian feast called Ushop. Unlike many North Indian paneer curries, it uses milk as the primary base for the gravy rather than tomato, onion, or garlic. Traditional preparations may exclude onions and garlic, using only ginger, bay leaves, and nigella seeds.

Sana Thongba is commonly served during festivals and social gatherings in the traditional Meitei community. It is prepared for occasions such as Cheiraoba feasts, annual convention feasts, culinary competitions, including chef contests, and other special events.

== Ingredients ==
The primary ingredients are paneer (or firm tofu), green peas, milk, water, turmeric, cumin seeds or nigella seeds, ginger, and salt. Some variations include potatoes, onions, and green chilies. Cooking oil or mustard oil is used, and ghee may be added for shallow frying the paneer. Fresh coriander leaves can be used as a garnish. The milk-to-water ratio can be adjusted to control gravy consistency.

== Preparation ==
Paneer is cut into cubes and lightly fried in oil or a combination of oil and ghee until golden brown. Aromatics, including cumin or nigella seeds and bay leaves, are briefly heated in the pan. Onions are added if used. Ginger or ginger-garlic paste is added and sautéed on low heat. Potatoes and green peas are then incorporated and lightly sautéed. Turmeric, chili powder, and salt are added. Water is poured over the vegetables, which are cooked under a covered pan until the potatoes are tender. Milk is added and the mixture is brought to a gentle boil to avoid curdling. The fried paneer is added, and the curry is simmered until the gravy thickens. Green chilies may be added near the end. The curry is garnished with chopped coriander leaves and served with steamed rice, roti, or phulkas.

== Variations ==
Some recipes omit onions and garlic entirely, following traditional practices. Potatoes and green chilies may be included to modify texture and heat. Firm tofu may be used instead of paneer to make the dish vegan. The proportion of milk to water can be adjusted to achieve the desired consistency, and ghee may be added to the oil used for frying the paneer.

== Nutrition ==
A standard serving of Sana Thongba contains approximately 266 kilocalories, 31.6 grams of carbohydrates, 12.4 grams of protein, 10.9 grams of fat, 2.9 grams of saturated fat, 4.2 grams of fiber, 10.2 grams of sugar, and 872 milligrams of sodium.

== Significance ==
Sana Thongba is an example of Meitei vegetarian cuisine. It shows both traditional preparation methods that exclude certain spices and modern variations that use additional vegetables and mild spices. The dish is included in the Ushop feast and can be served with rice or flatbreads.

== See also ==
- Chakluk
- Chamthong
- Maroi Bori Thongba
- Nga Thongba
- Tan Angangba
- Tharoi Thongba
- Yen Thongba
