= Chamthong =

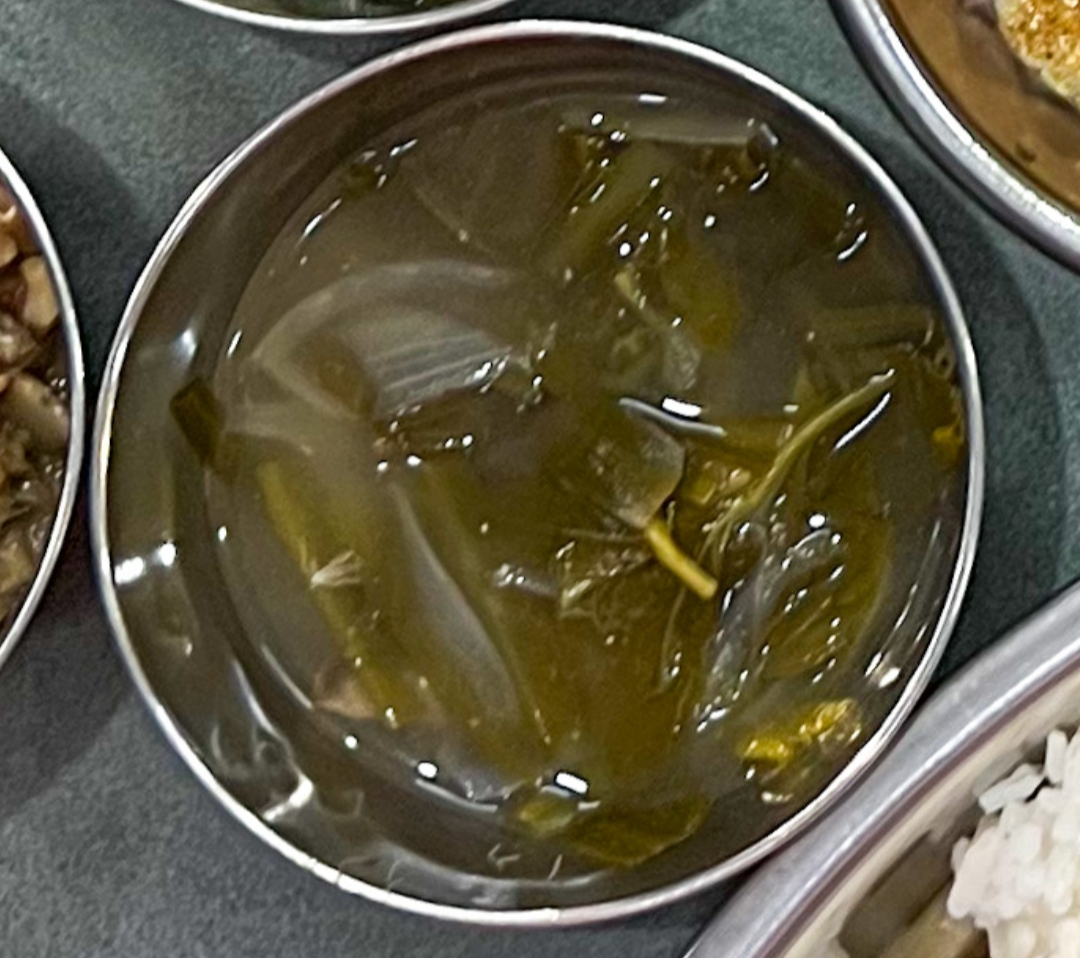
- Alternative names: Kangshoi, Kangsoi
- Place of origin: India
- Region or state: Manipur
- Variations: seasonal vegetables

Chamthong (ꯆꯝꯊꯣꯡ), also known as Kangshoi (ꯀꯥꯡꯁꯣꯏ) or Kangsoi, is a traditional vegetable stew of Meitei cuisine from the Indian state of Manipur. It is a popular and healthy dish known for its simple method of cooking and its use of seasonal vegetables.

In 2024, the 'Flavors of Seven Sisters and a Brother' section in the new menu Asian cuisine restaurant, Nest Asia, at Radisson Blu Guwahati, showed soups, from each of the eight Northeast India states, including the unique taste of Chamthong from Manipur.

== Description ==
Chamthong is a light vegetable stew made by boiling different vegetables with herbs and spices. It is usually prepared with seasonal vegetables such as bottle gourd, potatoes, beans, peas, pumpkin, carrot, spinach, amaranth greens, colocasia leaves, and jackfruit seeds. Other vegetables may also be used depending on availability.

The stew is flavored with ingredients such as onion, green onion, garlic, ginger, green chilies, turmeric, black pepper, cumin seeds, fenugreek seeds, and dried red chilies. Salt is added to taste. In some versions, dried fermented fish known as Ngari is added. This can be omitted to make a fully vegetarian version.

Manipuri food is generally simple and tasty. It often uses organic ingredients and contains less oil. Chili pepper is commonly used instead of garam masala powder. Chamthong is considered a healthy dish and is often prepared without oil.

== Preparation ==
Chamthong can be prepared in different ways, with or without oil. Traditionally, it was made without oil. The oil-free version does not use garlic or turmeric and is sometimes taken when a person has a fever.

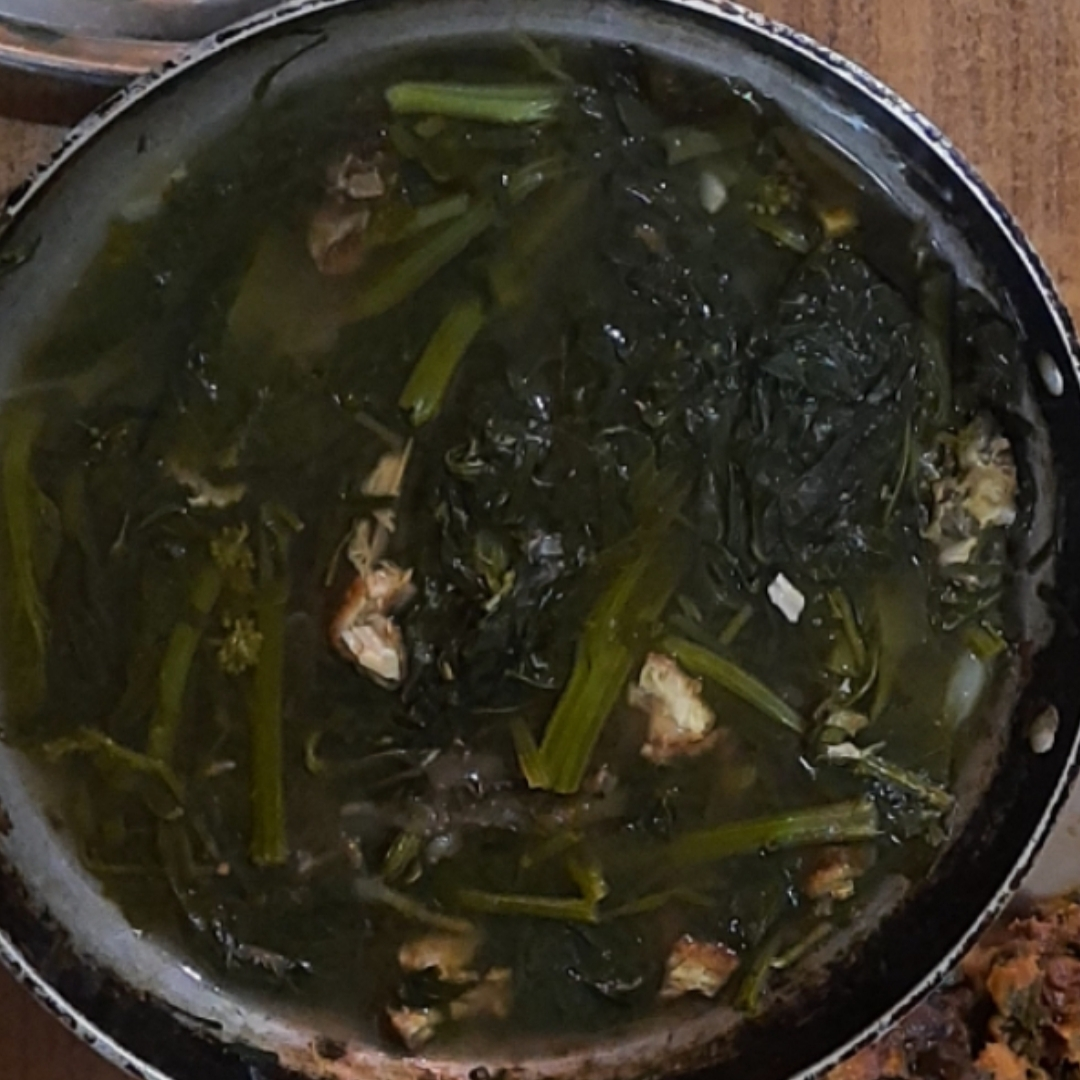
Hanggam Thongba (or Hangam Chamthong or Hanggam Kangshoi or Hanggam Kangsoi) - traditional Meitei mustard stew

In the oil-based version, oil such as mustard oil is heated in a pot or deep pan. Cumin seeds and dried red chilies may be added and cooked until they crackle. Garlic, ginger, onion, and green chilies are then added and lightly cooked without burning. Chopped vegetables are added and stirred for a few minutes. Turmeric powder, black pepper, and salt are mixed in. Water is poured into the pot until the vegetables are covered. The mixture is boiled and then simmered until the vegetables become soft. Some vegetables that require less cooking, such as cauliflower or spinach, may be added later. The stew may be cooked in an open pot for several minutes or in a pressure cooker that is turned off after one whistle. The potatoes are slightly crushed while stirring to improve the texture. Fresh coriander leaves may be added before serving.

In the oil-free version, onion, ginger, green chilies, and potato slices are placed in water while it is still cold. When the water begins to boil, other vegetables are added. Salt is mixed in, and the stew is boiled until the vegetables are tender. The dish is stirred well before serving.

Cooking usually takes about 20 to 30 minutes, depending on the quantity and type of vegetables used. The amount of water added affects the thickness and taste of the stew.

== Serving ==
Chamthong is traditionally served hot with steamed rice. It may also be served with fish. The dish is commonly eaten as part of a daily meal in Manipur. Different households may prepare it in slightly different ways, depending on personal taste and available ingredients.

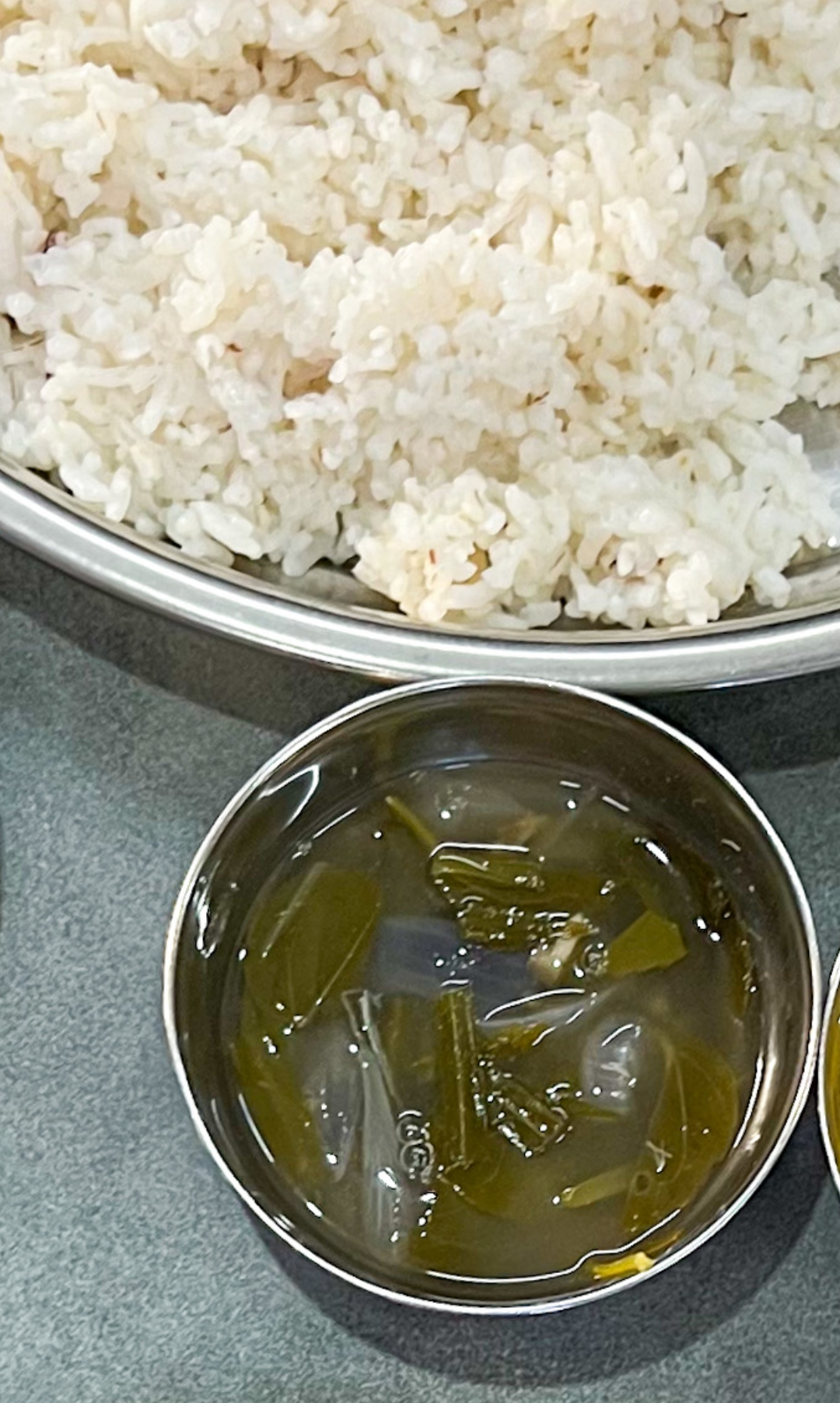
Rice & Chamthong (alias Kangshoi or Kangsoi)

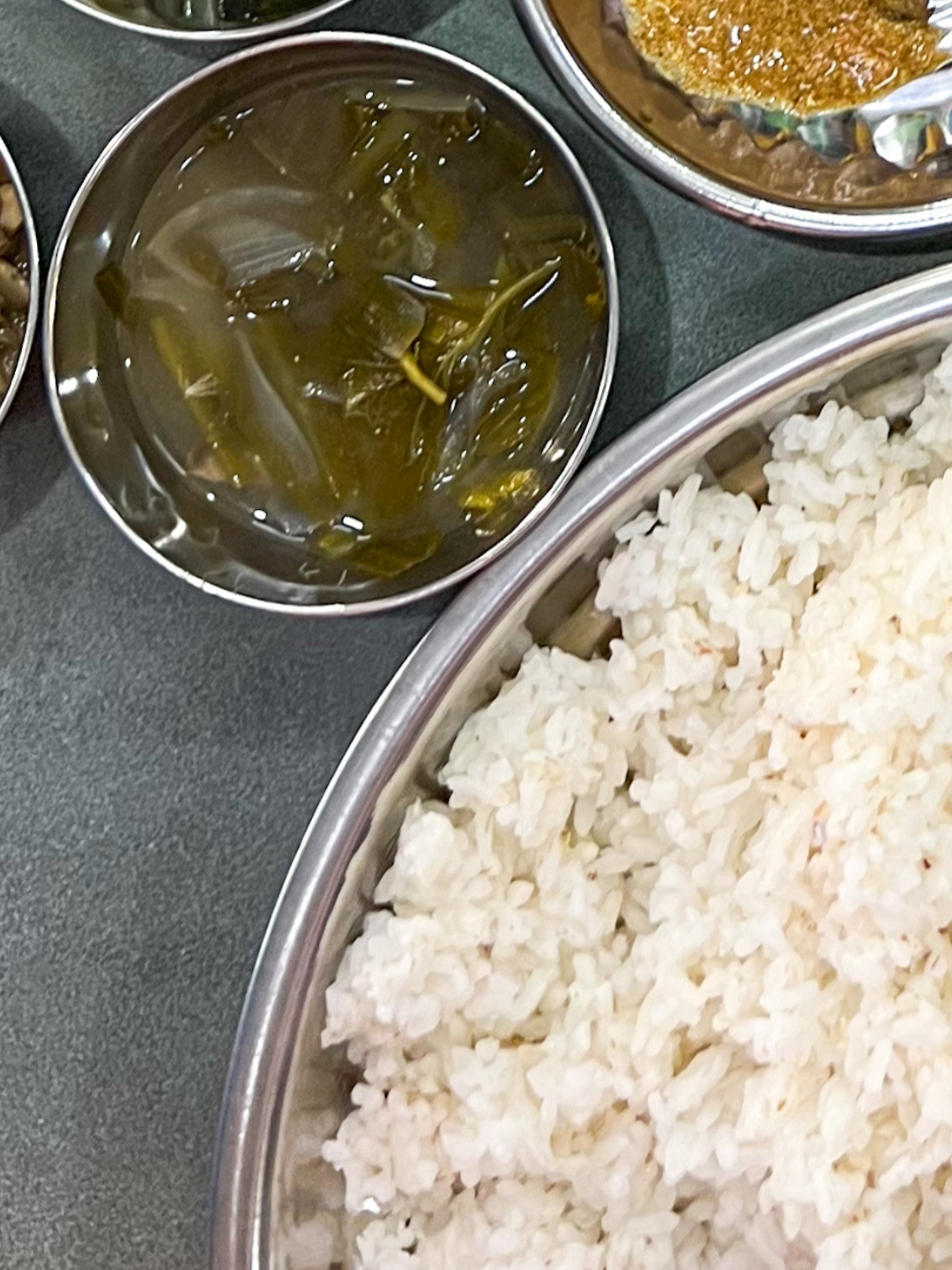
Chamthong served with rice

== Variations ==
There are many variations of Chamthong. Different vegetables may be used based on season and preference. The level of spiciness can be adjusted by adding more or fewer green chilies or pepper. Garlic may be omitted for a milder taste. Frozen vegetables can also be used if fresh ones are not available. Some versions may include tempering with spices, while others remain plain and simple.

Despite these variations, the main feature of Chamthong remains the same. It is a boiled vegetable stew that reflects the simple and healthy style of cooking in Manipur.

== See also ==
- Tan Ngang
- Maroi Bori Thongba
- Nga Thongba
- Sana Thongba
- Tharoi Thongba
- Yen Thongba
