= Kuroiler =

Hybrid bird

The Kuroiler is a hybrid breed of chicken developed by the Keggfarms Group in Gurgaon, Haryana, India. Kuroilers are derived from crossing either coloured broiler males with Rhode Island Red females, or, White Leghorn males crossed with female Rhode Island Reds.

== Characteristics ==
Kuroilers, a dual-purpose breed producing meat and eggs, can live on a diet of kitchen and agricultural waste, and produce around 150 eggs per year whereas native Indian hens lay only 40 per year. The meat yield per bird of Kuroilers is also greater; males weigh approximately 3.5 kg (7.7 lb) and females about 2.5 kg (5.5 lb) whereas the native male bird weighs 2.5 kg (5.5 lb) and females 1.2 kg (2.6 lb). Due to its unique genetic features, the Kuroiler is resistant to diseases.The Kuroiler chick has the potential to serve as a bio-converter of abundant agricultural, household, and natural waste in rural villages, transforming it into valuable human protein food and creating substantial incomes for rural households.

== History ==
Introduced in the early 1990s, the breed was created by Vinod Kapur of Kegg Farms Private, ltd., and the name is a portmanteau of Kegg and Broiler(KUROILER). Rather than all being raised in a central hatchery, Kuroiler eggs are hatched in more than a thousand "mother units" throughout the country, then are distributed down to the individual villages as day-old chicks.

Kuroilers have become popular in rural areas of India, including Uttar Pradesh, Jharkhand, West Bengal, Mizoram, Chhattisgarh, Assam, Meghalaya and Uttarakhand. Large numbers of landless or smallholder farmers –primary women– breed these chickens as a full-time or part-time business. Kuroilers have also been exported to countries such as Uganda with success.

== See also ==
- List of chicken breeds
