= Maroi bori thongba =

Lentil dumpling and chive curry and soup from Manipur

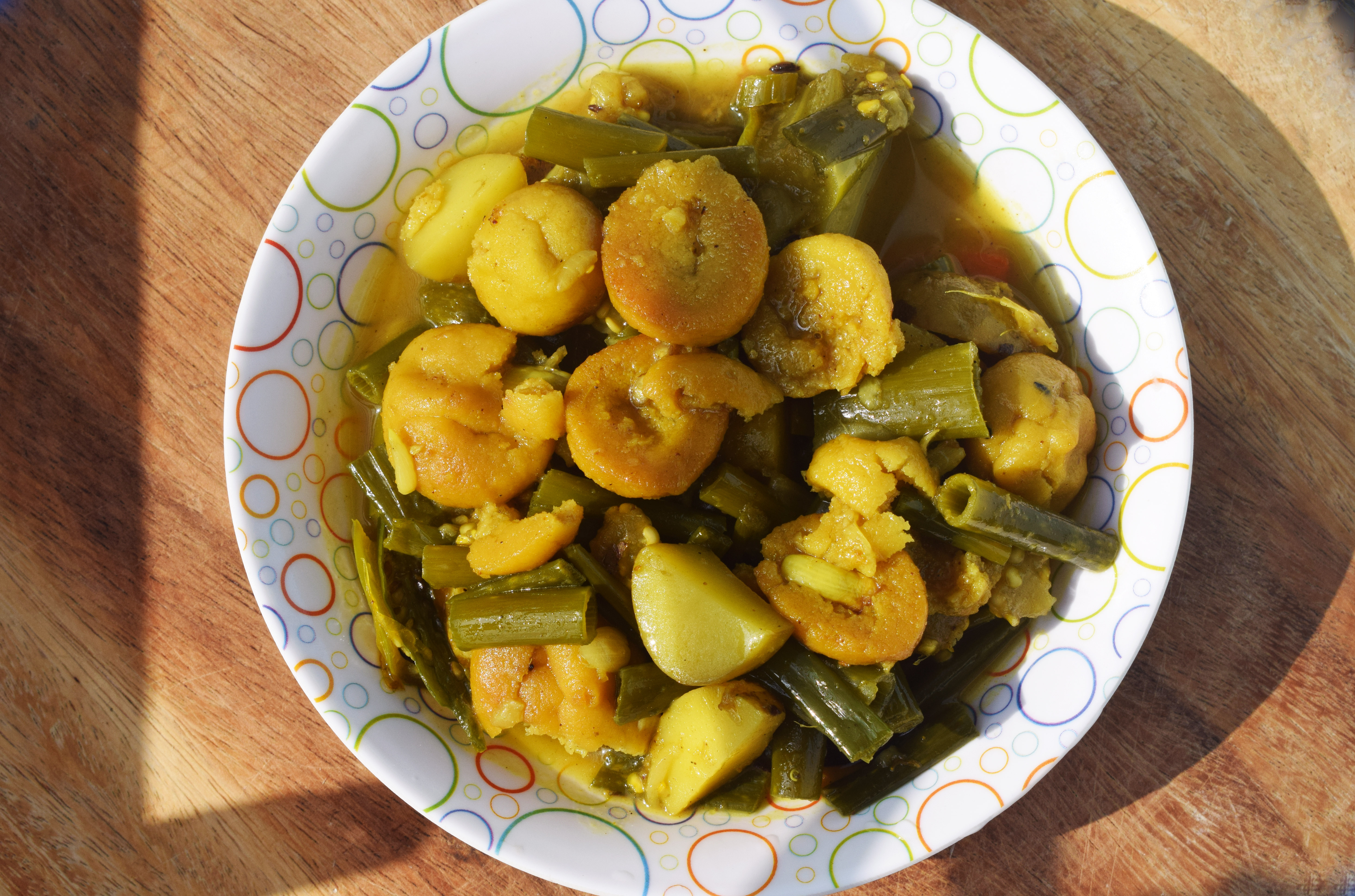
A curry made of Bori and vegetables

Maroi bori thongba (Meitei: ꯃꯔꯣꯏ ꯕꯣꯔꯤ ꯊꯣꯡꯕ), also known as maroi thongba, bori thongba, or aloo badi Manipuri, is a traditional Meitei curry from Manipur. It is made with sun-dried lentil dumplings or nuggets, potatoes, spices, heribob (a citrus fruit native to Manipur) and maroi (one of several alliums).

== Ingredients ==
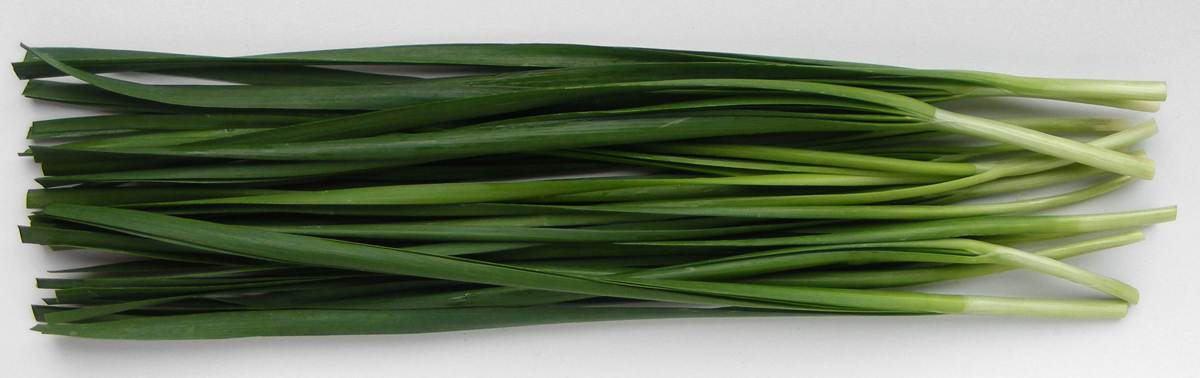
Maroi (garlic chives) are usually used.

Maroi bori thongba is prepared with a large quantity of maroi nakuppi, which are chives used in Meitei traditional cooking as a substitute for onion and garlic. The word maroi can indicate one of several different alliums used in Meitei cuisine: maroi nakupi (garlic chives, Allium ramosum, or Allium odorum); or maroi napakpi (Allium hookeri).

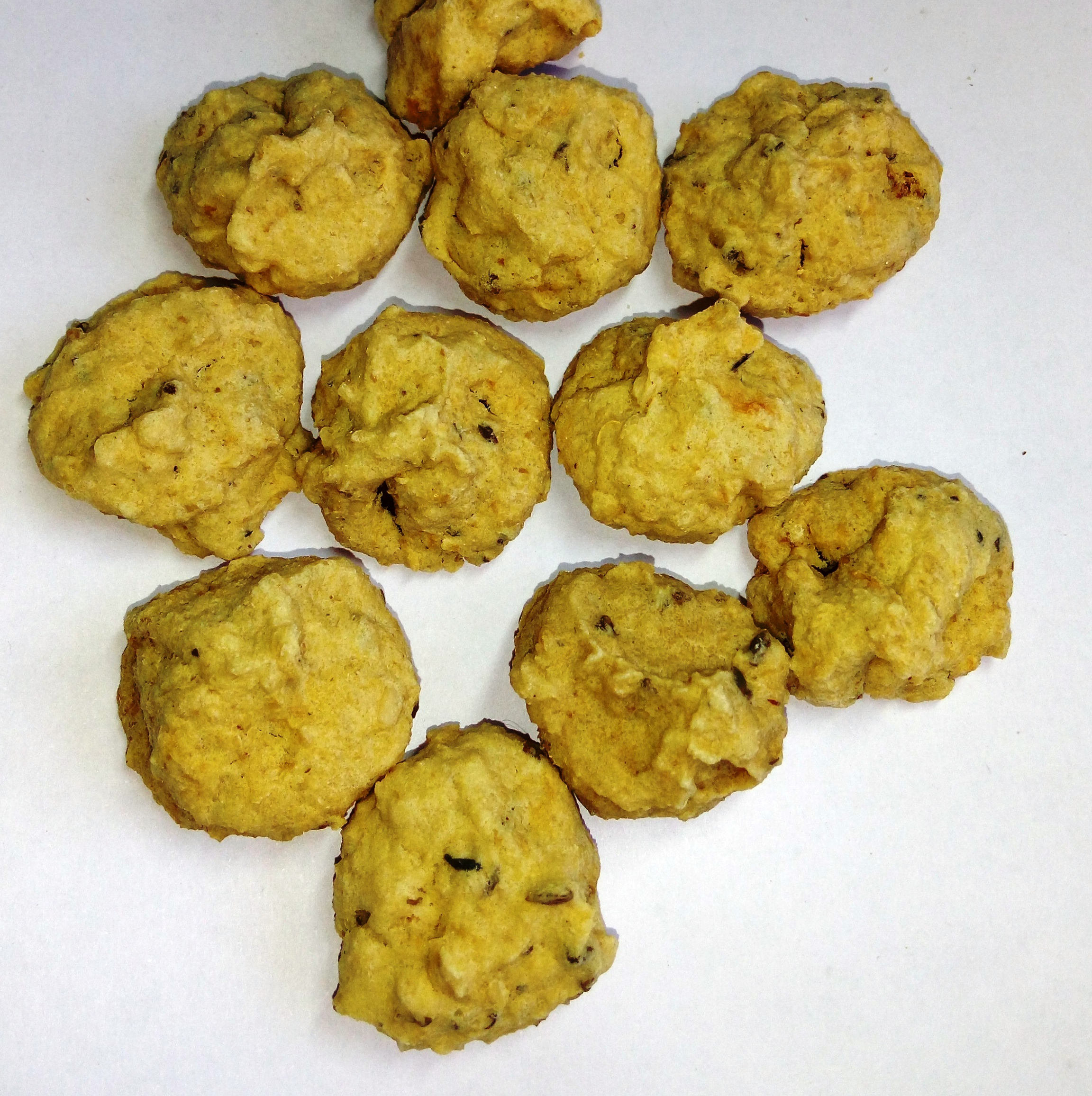
Bori, or badi, sundried ground lentil nuggets or dumplings

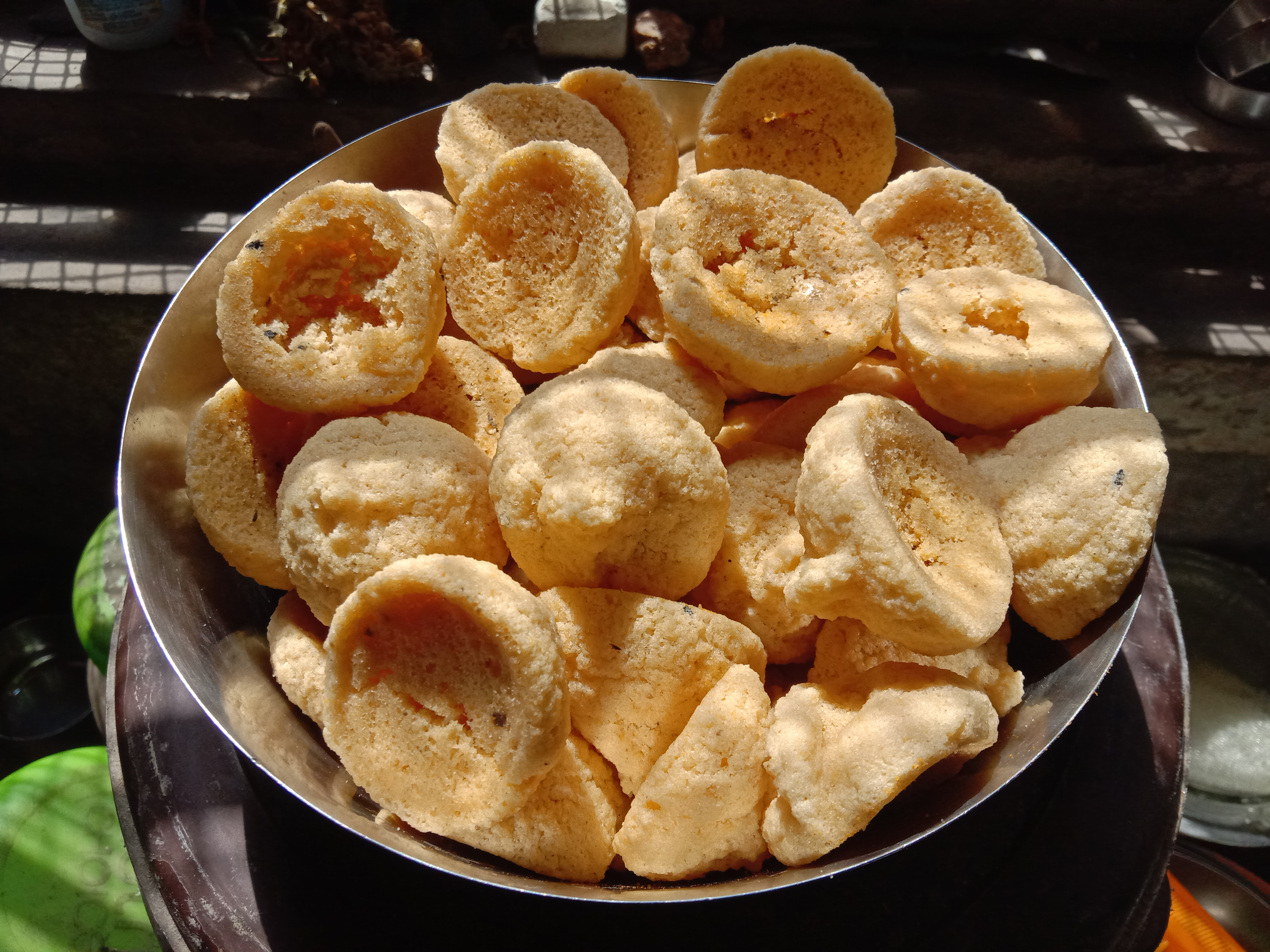
Bori nuggets in a bowl

Bori are small nuggets made from soaked, ground, and sun-dried urad dal (black gram) and spices. They are used across India and are known by different names such as bori, bari, or wadi.

Maroi bori thongba also contains mustard oil, garam masala, vegetables, and whole dried red chillies, and may include peanuts, potatoes, or thangjing (foxnut).

Changes can be made to the traditional recipe if some ingredients are unavailable. Spring onions can be used in place of chives, and lemon can be substituted for heiribob.

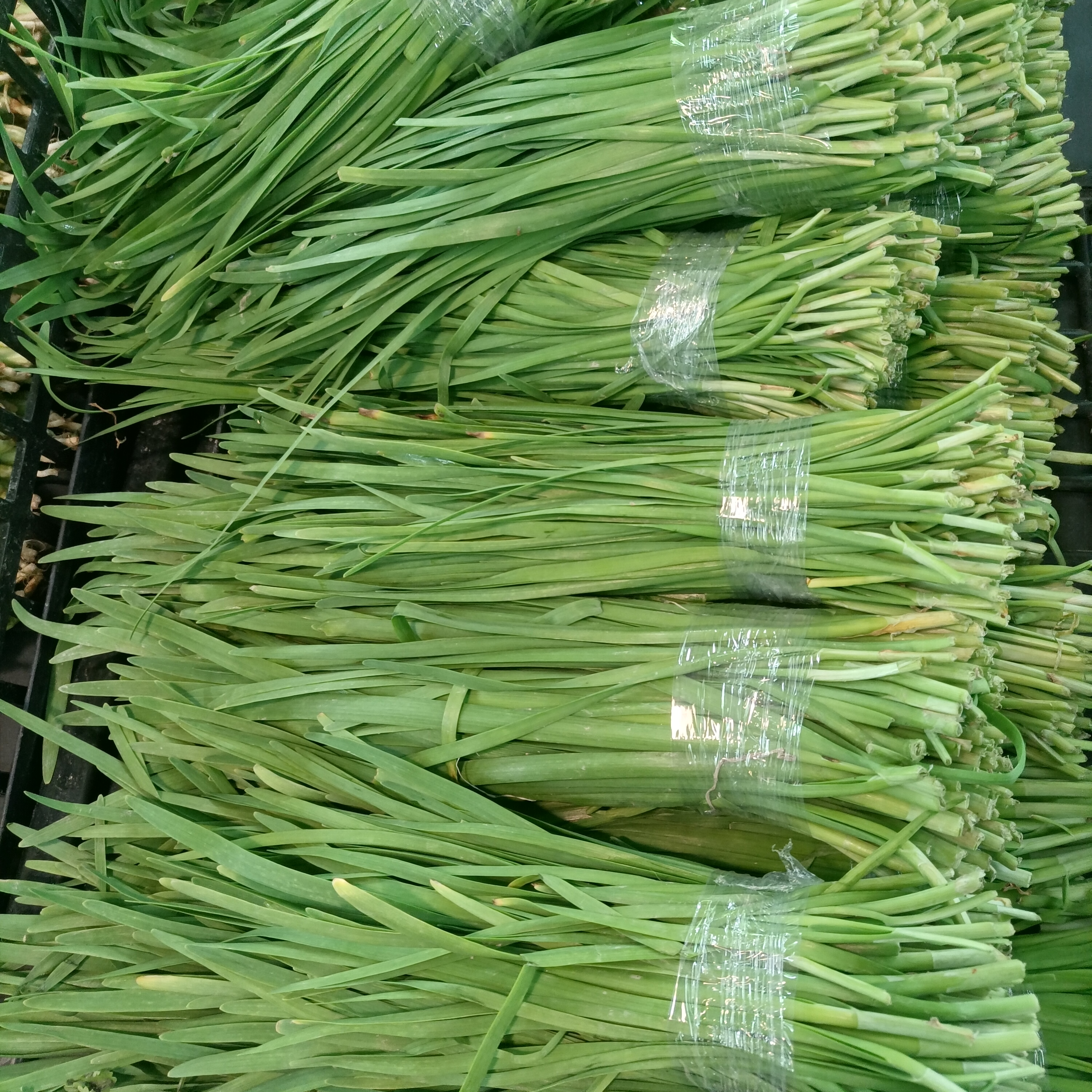
Maroi (Chinese chives) are among the main ingredients.

== Preparation ==
The bori are added to a hot pan containing mustard and fried on low heat until they turn light brown. Whole dried red chillies are then added and fried until they begin to turn black. The badi and chillies are then removed and set aside. Cumin seeds are then and allowed to crackle. Asafoetida, bay leaves, and sliced chives are then added and sauteed until the chives begin to blacken. The heat is increased and sliced onions are added and cooked until they turn golden brown. Ginger and garlic pastes are then added and sauteed. Tomatoes are added and stirred on high heat until they blend into the sauce.

The fried badi and red chillies are returned to the pan and diced potatoes are added. Garam masala, minced heribob, salt, and water are added and the pan is brought to a boil, then allowed to simmer for about twenty minutes. The dish is ready when the potatoes are cooked and the badi are soft and spongy. Maroi bori thongba is served hot with steamed rice.

== See also ==
- Maibaron
- Chamthong
- Nga thongba
- Sana thongba
- Tharoi thongba
- Yen thongba
