= Kaunayen chicken =

Chicken breed

Kaunayen (ꯀꯥꯎꯅꯌꯦꯟ) is an indigenous chicken breed from the Imphal Valley of Manipur, India. It is traditionally reared by the Manipuri people in backyard systems and is mainly used for cockfighting. The breed is known for its fighting ability and distinct physical traits.

== Recognition ==
Kaunayen was officially registered as an indigenous chicken breed by the Indian Council of Agricultural Research – National Bureau of Animal Genetic Resources (ICAR-NBAGR) in June 2016. It became the 17th registered chicken breed in India.

== Distribution ==
The breed is native to Manipur and is mainly found in the Imphal Valley. Although it shows variation among birds from different parts of the state, Kaunayen chickens share common physical and behavioral traits.

== Physical characteristics ==
Kaunayen chickens have an elongated body, long neck, and long legs. Broodiness is common in hens.

Plumage color is usually black or brown. Males often show a patchy pattern, while females usually have a solid color. Adult cocks commonly have shining bluish-black feathers on the wings, breast, tail, and thighs. In fighting cocks, the neck, breast, and thighs are often bare, hard, and rose-red in color.

The comb is red and pea-shaped.

=== Weight ===
The average body weight of an adult cock is about 3.01 kg, while an adult hen weighs around 2.32 kg.

=== Eggs ===
A Kaunayen hen lays about 35 eggs per year. The eggs are medium-sized, with an average weight of about 42.43 g. The shell color is brown.

- Egg quality measurements include:
- Albumen index: 0.07
- Yolk index: 0.38
- Haugh unit: 76.88

== Related breeds ==
Morphologically, Kaunayen chickens appear similar to Danki and Aseel breeds. However, Kaunayen is native to Manipur, which is geographically distant and isolated from the breeding areas of Danki and Aseel. Due to long-term adaptation to local conditions, Kaunayen is considered a distinct population of fighting chickens.

== Genetic characteristics ==
Despite being registered as a single breed, Kaunayen chickens show high genetic diversity within the population. Molecular studies indicate that the breed is phylogenetically closer to Southeast Asian chickens, with links to some East Asian and South Asian breeds. The findings support Kaunayen as a distinct indigenous breed with unique genetic features.

== See also ==
- Kakyen
