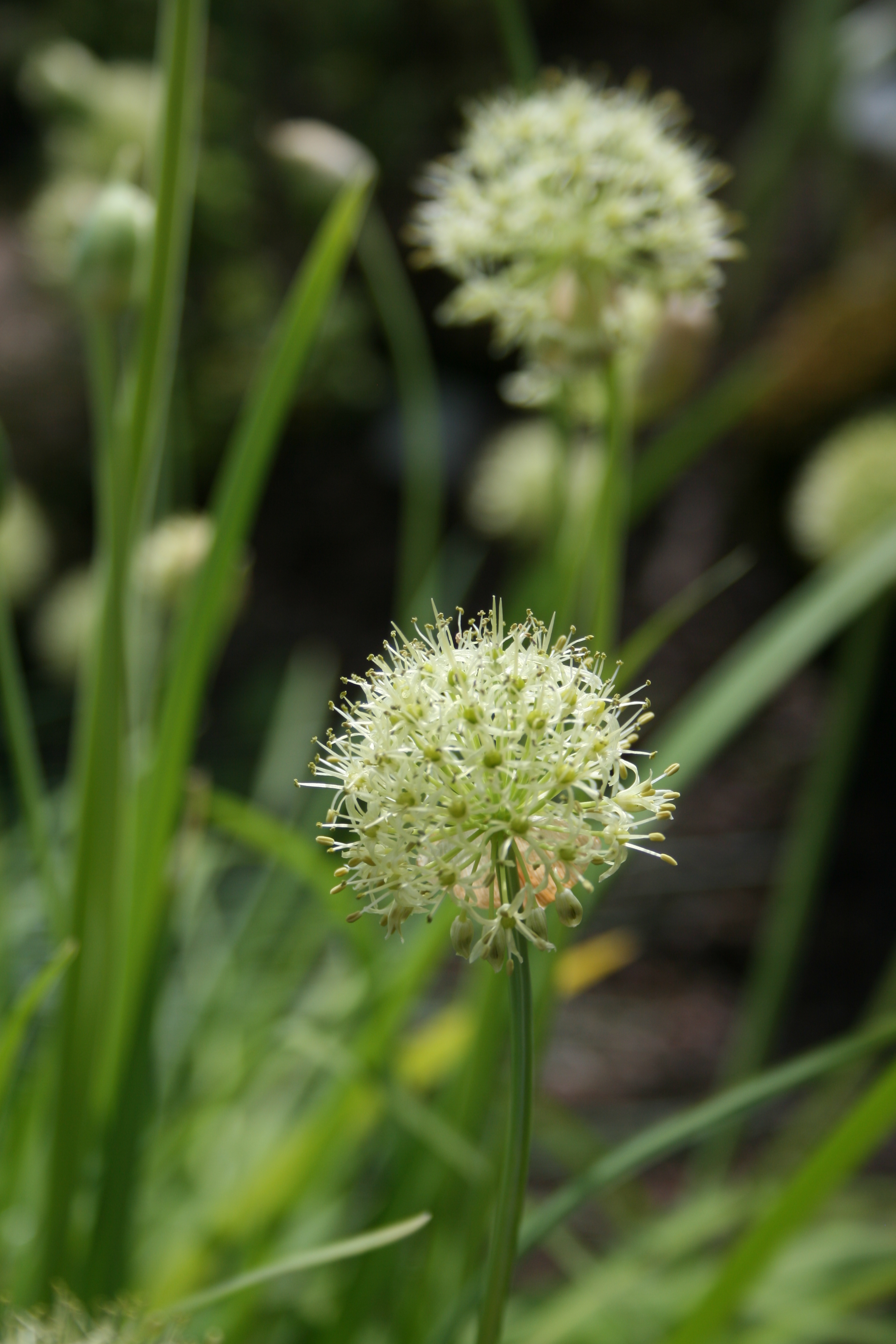

Scientific classification
- Kingdom: Plantae
- Clade: Tracheophytes
- Clade: Angiosperms
- Clade: Monocots
- Order: Asparagales
- Family: Amaryllidaceae
- Subfamily: Allioideae
- Genus: Allium
- Subgenus: A. subg. Amerallium
- Species: A. hookeri

Binomial name
- Allium hookeri Thwaites

Synonyms
- Allium tsoongii F.T.Wang & Tang

= Allium hookeri =

Species of plant

Allium hookeri is a plant species native to India, Sri Lanka, Myanmar (Burma), Bhutan, and southwestern China (Sichuan, Tibet and Yunnan). Common names include Hooker chives and garlic chives.

Allium hookeri produces thick, fleshy roots and a cluster of thin bulbs. Scapes are up top 60 cm tall. Leaves are flat and narrow, about the same length as the scapes but only 1 cm across. Umbels are crowded with many white or greenish-yellow flowers.

== Uses ==
Allium hookeri is widely cultivated outside its native range, and valued as a food item in much of South and Southeast Asia.
